= 2018 NHL Stadium Series =

Outdoor National Hockey League game

	1	2	3	Total
Toronto Maple Leafs	1	1	0	2
Washington Capitals	3	2	0	5
- Date: March 3, 2018
- Venue: Navy–Marine Corps Memorial Stadium
- City: Annapolis
- Attendance: 29,516

The 2018 NHL Stadium Series (officially the 2018 Coors Light NHL Stadium Series for sponsorship reasons) was a regular season National Hockey League (NHL) game played outdoors, part of the Stadium Series of games held at football or baseball stadiums. The Washington Capitals defeated the Toronto Maple Leafs, 5–2, at Navy–Marine Corps Memorial Stadium, the home stadium of the U.S. Naval Academy in Annapolis, Maryland, on March 3, 2018.

This was the only game in the Stadium Series scheduled for the 2017–18 season (as opposed to multiple games in 2014 and 2016), and marked the first appearance of a Canadian team in the Stadium Series.

== Background ==
NHL commissioner Gary Bettman said the 2018 Stadium Series game is the start of a unique partnership with the U.S. military in which the NHL plans to host outdoor games at military service academies around the United States. In the fall of 2016, the NHL and the New York Rangers explored the possibility of holding an outdoor game at Michie Stadium on the campus of the U.S. Military Academy in West Point, New York.

== Game summary ==
March 3, 2018	Toronto Maple Leafs	2–5	Washington Capitals	Navy–Marine Corps Memorial Stadium	Recap

Washington's Alexander Ovechkin scored his 40th goal of the season, while Nicklas Backstrom, Evgeny Kuznetsov and John Carlson each had a goal and two assists. With ten minutes left in the third period, a power outage at Navy–Marine Corps Memorial Stadium suspended play for about 15 minutes. Despite the power failure delay, the Capitals went on to win the game 5–2. In addition to the Ovechkin goal, the other Capitals players who scored were Evgeny Kuznetsov, Nicklas Backstrom, John Carlson, and Jakub Vrana. Nazem Kadri and Zach Hyman scored the Maple Leafs' goals.

Scoring summary
Period	Team	Goal	Assist(s)	Time	Score
1st	WSH	Evgeny Kuznetsov (20) – pp	Nicklas Backstrom (32), John Carlson (40)	03:50	WSH 1–0
1st	TOR	Zach Hyman (13)	Roman Polak (8)	05:20	1–1
1st	WSH	Alexander Ovechkin (40)	Tom Wilson (18), Nicklas Backstrom (33)	06:19	WSH 2–1
1st	WSH	Nicklas Backstrom (20) – pp	Evgeny Kuznetsov (43), John Carlson (41)	16:20	WSH 3–1
2nd	TOR	Nazem Kadri (24)	Patrick Marleau (15), Travis Dermott (8)	07:22	WSH 3–2
2nd	WSH	John Carlson (12)	Chandler Stephenson (10), Jay Beagle (14)	08:05	WSH 4–2
2nd	WSH	Jakub Vrana (11)	Evgeny Kuznetsov (44), Dmitry Orlov (16)	10:49	WSH 5–2
3rd	No scoring				

Number in parentheses represents the player's total in goals or assists to that point of the season.

Penalty summary
Period	Team	Player	Penalty	Time	PIM
1st	TOR	Travis Dermott	Holding	02:43	2:00
1st	WSH	John Carlson	Delay of game	12:20	2:00
1st	TOR	Dominic Moore	Delay of game	15:28	2:00
2nd	No penalties				
3rd	WSH	Matt Niskanen	Hooking	18:58	2:00

Shots by period
Team	1	2	3	Total
Toronto	7	12	10	29
Washington	12	18	4	34

Power play opportunities
Team	Goals/Opportunities
Toronto	0/2
Washington	2/2

Three star selections
	Team	Player	Statistics
1st	WSH	John Carlson	1 goal, 2 assists
2nd	WSH	Evgeny Kuznetsov	1 goal, 2 assists
3rd	WSH	Nicklas Backstrom	1 goal, 2 assists

== Team rosters ==
Toronto Maple Leafs
#		Player	Position
2	(United States)	Ron Hainsey	D
11	(Canada)	Zach Hyman	C
12	(Canada)	Patrick Marleau	C
16	(Canada)	Mitch Marner	C
19	(Czech Republic)	Tomas Plekanec	C
20	(Canada)	Dominic Moore	C
22	(Russia)	Nikita Zaitsev	D
23	(Canada)	Travis Dermott	D
24	(Finland)	Kasperi Kapanen	RW
25	(United States)	James van Riemsdyk	LW
28	(Canada)	Connor Brown	RW
29	(Sweden)	William Nylander	C
31	(Denmark)	Frederik Andersen	G
35	(Canada)	Curtis McElhinney	G
42	(Canada)	Tyler Bozak (A)	C
43	(Canada)	Nazem Kadri	C
44	(Canada)	Morgan Rielly (A)	D
46	(Czech Republic)	Roman Polak	D
47	(Finland)	Leo Komarov (A)	C
51	(United States)	Jake Gardiner	D
Head coach: (Canada) Mike Babcock

Washington Capitals
#		Player	Position
2	(United States)	Matt Niskanen	D
6	(Czech Republic)	Michal Kempny	D
8	(Russia)	Alexander Ovechkin (C)	LW
9	(Russia)	Dmitry Orlov	D
10	(Canada)	Brett Connolly	LW
13	(Czech Republic)	Jakub Vrana	LW
18	(Canada)	Chandler Stephenson	C
19	(Sweden)	Nicklas Backstrom (A)	C
20	(Denmark)	Lars Eller	C
25	(Canada)	Devante Smith-Pelly	RW
29	(Sweden)	Christian Djoos	D
31	(Germany)	Philipp Grubauer	G
43	(Canada)	Tom Wilson	RW
44	(United States)	Brooks Orpik (A)	D
65	(Sweden)	Andre Burakovsky	LW
70	(Canada)	Braden Holtby	G
74	(United States)	John Carlson	D
77	(United States)	T. J. Oshie	RW
83	(Canada)	Jay Beagle	C
92	(Russia)	Evgeny Kuznetsov	C
Head coach: (Canada) Barry Trotz

Philipp Grubauer dressed as the back-up goaltender for Washington and did not enter the game.

=== Scratches ===
- Toronto Maple Leafs: Connor Carrick, Matt Martin, Josh Leivo
- Washington Capitals: Madison Bowey, Jakub Jerabek, Alex Chiasson, Travis Boyd

== Television ==
The game was televised in the United States on NBC, and in Canada as part of the Hockey Night in Canada coverage that was simulcast of both CBC and Sportsnet, and in French on TVA Sports.

To accommodate NBC's preferred 8 p.m ET start time for the Stadium Series game, HNIC had an irregular schedule on this particular Saturday: the Montreal Canadiens' game against the Boston Bruins was played earlier at 5 p.m., the Ottawa Senators at Arizona Coyotes contest (on City) also took place at 8 p.m. instead of the normal 7 p.m. start time for the early games, and the late doubleheader game featuring the New York Rangers at the Edmonton Oilers was pushed to 10:30 p.m. ET.

Due to the power outage delay, NBC switched the final minutes of the game to NBCSN at 11 p.m. ET to prevent local newscasts and Saturday Night Live from being delayed.
