= 2018 Stanley Cup Final =

2018 ice hockey championship series

	1	2	3	4	5	Total
Washington Capitals	4	3	3	6	4	4
Vegas Golden Knights	6	2	1	2	3	1
- Location(s): Washington: Capital One Arena (3, 4); Paradise: T-Mobile Arena (1, 2, 5)
- Coaches: Washington: Barry Trotz; Vegas: Gerard Gallant
- Captains: Washington: Alexander Ovechkin; Vegas: Vacant
- National anthems: Washington: Caleb Green and Bob McDonald (3) Caleb Green, Bob McDonald and U.S. Army chorus (4); Vegas: Carnell Johnson
- Referees: Marc Joannette (1, 3, 5); Wes McCauley (1, 3, 5); Chris Rooney (2, 4); Kelly Sutherland (2, 4)
- Dates: May 28 – June 7, 2018
- MVP: Alexander Ovechkin (Capitals)
- Series-winning goal: Lars Eller (12:23, third)
- Networks: Canada: (English): CBC/Sportsnet (French): TVA Sports; United States: (English): NBC (1, 4–5), NBCSN (2–3)
- Announcers: (CBC/SN) Jim Hughson and Craig Simpson (TVA) Felix Seguin and Patrick Lalime (NBC/NBCSN) Mike Emrick, Eddie Olczyk, and Pierre McGuire (NHL International) Steve Mears and Kevin Weekes (NBC Sports Radio & NHL Radio) Kenny Albert, Joe Micheletti (1–4), Ray Ferraro, Jim Fox (5), and Steve Goldstein

The 2018 Stanley Cup Final was the championship series of the National Hockey League's (NHL) 2017–18 season and the culmination of the 2018 Stanley Cup playoffs. The Eastern Conference champion Washington Capitals defeated the Western Conference champion Vegas Golden Knights four games to one to win their first championship, in their 44th season. The Vegas Golden Knights made the Finals in their first season, while this was the second Finals appearance for the Capitals (the first was in 1998). This was the first Finals series since 2007 where neither team had previously won the Stanley Cup and the third consecutive year in which a Western Conference team made their Finals debut. This was the first Finals since 2014 to require fewer than six games, and the first since 2011 in which the eventual winner lost the first game. Washington captain Alexander Ovechkin was awarded the Conn Smythe Trophy as the most valuable player of the playoffs.

The series began on May 28 and ended on June 7. Having won the Pacific Division with 109 points during the regular season the Vegas Golden Knights had home ice advantage in the series while the Capitals won the Metropolitan Division with 105 points.

== Path to the Finals ==
=== Washington Capitals ===
This was Washington's second Finals appearance; the Capitals were swept in four games by the Detroit Red Wings in 1998.

The Capitals did not make many major offseason transactions with the exception of signing forward Devante Smith-Pelly. Major re-signings during the off-season included forwards T. J. Oshie, Evgeny Kuznetsov, and Andre Burakovsky; and goalie Philipp Grubauer. Washington then re-signed Lars Eller during the season. The team was conservative during the trade deadline. Wanting to make a Stanley Cup run with the core players that they already had, they only acquired defencemen Michal Kempny from the Chicago Blackhawks and Jakub Jerabek from the Montreal Canadiens.

The Capitals finished the regular season with 105 points (49–26–7), winning their division. Left winger and team captain Alexander Ovechkin was the winner of this season's Maurice "Rocket" Richard Trophy, leading the league with 49 regular-season goals. Kuznetsov led the team in assists with 56.

In the first round of playoffs, Washington came back from a 2–0 series deficit to win four in a row and beat the Columbus Blue Jackets in six games. The Capitals then won a six-game series against their division rival and two-time defending champion Pittsburgh Penguins, whom the Capitals had beaten in a playoff series only once in ten previous attempts since 1994; losing the last seven prior series to them. The Penguins had eliminated Washington from the playoffs in the second round the previous two years. Washington then defeated the Tampa Bay Lightning in the Eastern Conference Finals in seven games, winning game seven on the road for only the second time in franchise history and first since 2012.

=== Vegas Golden Knights ===
Vegas became the first expansion team since the 1967–68 St. Louis Blues to make the Stanley Cup Final in their inaugural season. However, the 1967–68 expansion was structured so that an expansion team was guaranteed to make the final. By contrast, the Golden Knights entered the season as long shots to make the postseason, let alone the Finals, with sources like Deadspin and Newsweek predicting that the Golden Knights would be among the worst teams in the league. However, the Golden Knights exceeded even the most optimistic projections to turn in one of the strongest debut seasons for an expansion team in North American professional sports history.

Las Vegas was awarded as the NHL's 31st franchise on June 22, 2016, to begin to play for the 2017–18 season. On April 13, 2017, the team announced the hiring of their inaugural head coach, Gerard Gallant. The team then participated in the 2017 NHL expansion draft on June 21, selecting an available player from all of the other 30 NHL teams. Some notable selections included goalie Marc-Andre Fleury, who had won three Stanley Cups as a member of the Pittsburgh Penguins, winger James Neal from the Nashville Predators, and Jonathan Marchessault from the Florida Panthers. Fleury was left exposed by the Penguins because of the emergence of Matt Murray. The Panthers, who had salary cap issues, traded Reilly Smith to the Golden Knights in exchange for Vegas selecting Marchessault.

The team started winning, despite Fleury being injured for most of the first months of the season. The team relied on four other goaltenders while their starter was injured. Instead of being sellers trying to unload players with one-year contracts by the trade deadline, Vegas became surprise buyers, acquiring Ryan Reaves from the Penguins and Tomas Tatar from the Detroit Red Wings.

On March 26, 2018, Vegas became the first team to make the playoffs in their inaugural season in the league since the Edmonton Oilers and Hartford Whalers in the 1979–80 season. Following that achievement, on March 31, Vegas became the first modern-era expansion team from any of the four major sports and the first NHL team since the 1926–27 New York Rangers to win their division in their inaugural season (excluding the 1967–68 Philadelphia Flyers, as all teams in the West Division that year were expansion teams). The Golden Knights ended up finishing the regular season with 109 points (51–24–7). In the playoffs, Vegas swept the Los Angeles Kings in four games, defeated the San Jose Sharks in six games, and eliminated the Winnipeg Jets in the Western Conference Finals in five games.

With Vegas' trip to the 2018 Finals, a brand-new team in the league has now reached the Stanley Cup Final every 50 years dating back to 1918. The Toronto Arenas reached the 1918 Stanley Cup Final and won the Cup, but this was the first year of the new NHL (after every team except the Toronto Blueshirts left the National Hockey Association). The St. Louis Blues reached the 1968 Stanley Cup Final and got swept by the Montreal Canadiens. However, the Blues and five other brand-new expansion teams all entered the league at the same time and were all placed in the West Division, with the Original Six comprising the East Division. The playoffs were structured so that one of the newly minted teams was guaranteed a berth in the Finals. In contrast, the Golden Knights were the first true expansion team in NHL history to advance all the way to the Finals while not playing in an all-expansion division.

The Golden Knights were only the second captainless team since 1973 to be in the Finals, and the first since the New York Rangers in 2014.

== Game summaries ==
Number in parentheses represents the player's total goals or assists to that point of the entire four rounds of the playoffs

=== Game one ===
May 28	Washington Capitals	4–6	Vegas Golden Knights	T-Mobile Arena	Recap

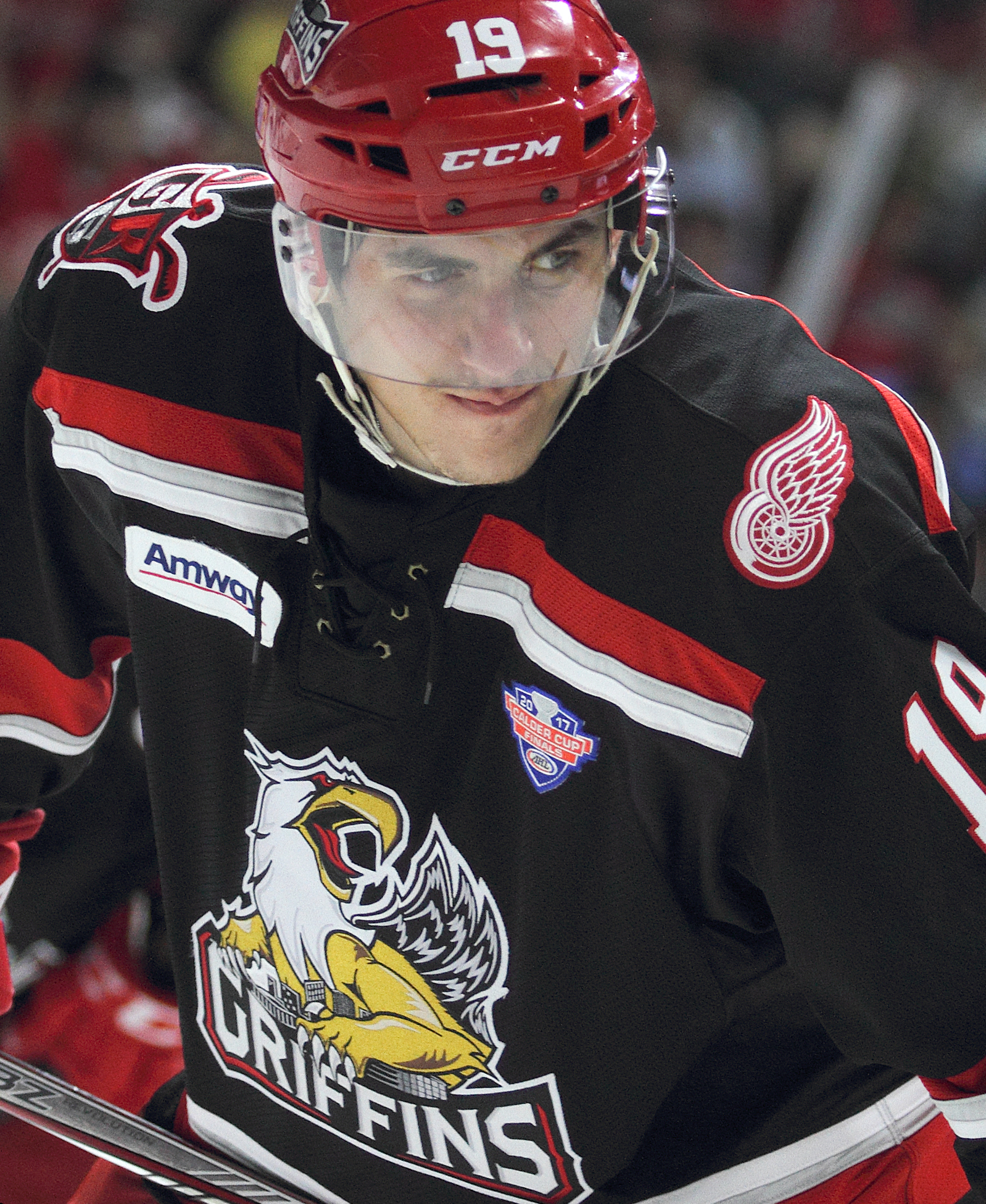
Tomas Nosek, shown with Grand Rapids, scored two goals, including the game-winner, in Game 1.

Both teams scored twice in the opening period. The first goal came from Vegas Golden Knights defenceman Colin Miller whose slap shot went past Capitals goaltender Braden Holtby. Washington struck back later in the period as both Brett Connolly and Nicklas Backstrom scored 42 seconds apart. William Karlsson then snuck the puck in between Holtby and the left post to tie the game. Early in the second period, a rebound off the glass came to Deryk Engelland who passed to an open Reilly Smith firing one past Holtby. Capitals defenceman John Carlson tied up the score after some nice passing from the defender and T. J. Oshie left himself wide open for the goal. In the third period, Tom Wilson redirected Alexander Ovechkin's shot past Vegas goaltender Marc-Andre Fleury to take the lead in the game. However, Vegas responded 1:41 later as Ryan Reaves went top-shelf to tie the game yet again. This goal proved to be controversial, as Ryan Reaves illegally cross-checked John Carlson to get into position to score. Tomas Nosek was able to score for Vegas later in the period, taking the pass from Shea Theodore. Vegas kept the lead in the penultimate minutes, grabbing an empty-net goal in the final minute to finish the game 6–4.

Scoring summary
Period	Team	Goal	Assist(s)	Time	Score
1st	VGK	Colin Miller (3) – pp	Erik Haula (5)	07:15	1–0 VGK
1st	WSH	Brett Connolly (5)	Michal Kempny (2), Andre Burakovsky (1)	14:41	1–1
1st	WSH	Nicklas Backstrom (5)	T. J. Oshie (9), Jakub Vrana (5)	15:23	2–1 WSH
1st	VGK	William Karlsson (7)	Reilly Smith (15), Deryk Engelland (1)	18:19	2–2
2nd	VGK	Reilly Smith (3)	Deryk Engelland (2), Jonathan Marchessault (11)	03:21	3–2 VGK
2nd	WSH	John Carlson (4)	T. J. Oshie (10), Nicklas Backstrom (13)	08:29	3–3
3rd	WSH	Tom Wilson (4)	Alexander Ovechkin (11), Evgeny Kuznetsov (14)	01:10	4–3 WSH
3rd	VGK	Ryan Reaves (2)	Unassisted	02:41	4–4
3rd	VGK	Tomas Nosek (2)	Shea Theodore (6)	09:44	5–4 VGK
3rd	VGK	Tomas Nosek (3) – en	David Perron (8)	19:57	6–4 VGK
Penalty summary
Period	Team	Player	Penalty	Time	PIM
1st	WSH	Andre Burakovsky	Boarding	05:53	2:00
2nd	VGK	Bench (served by David Perron)	Too many men on the ice	13:55	2:00
3rd	WSH	Tom Wilson	Interference	05:53	2:00
3rd	VGK	David Perron	Cross-checking	05:53	2:00

Shots by period
Team	1	2	3	Total
WSH	10	8	10	28
VGK	11	14	9	34

=== Game two ===
May 30	Washington Capitals	3–2	Vegas Golden Knights	T-Mobile Arena	Recap

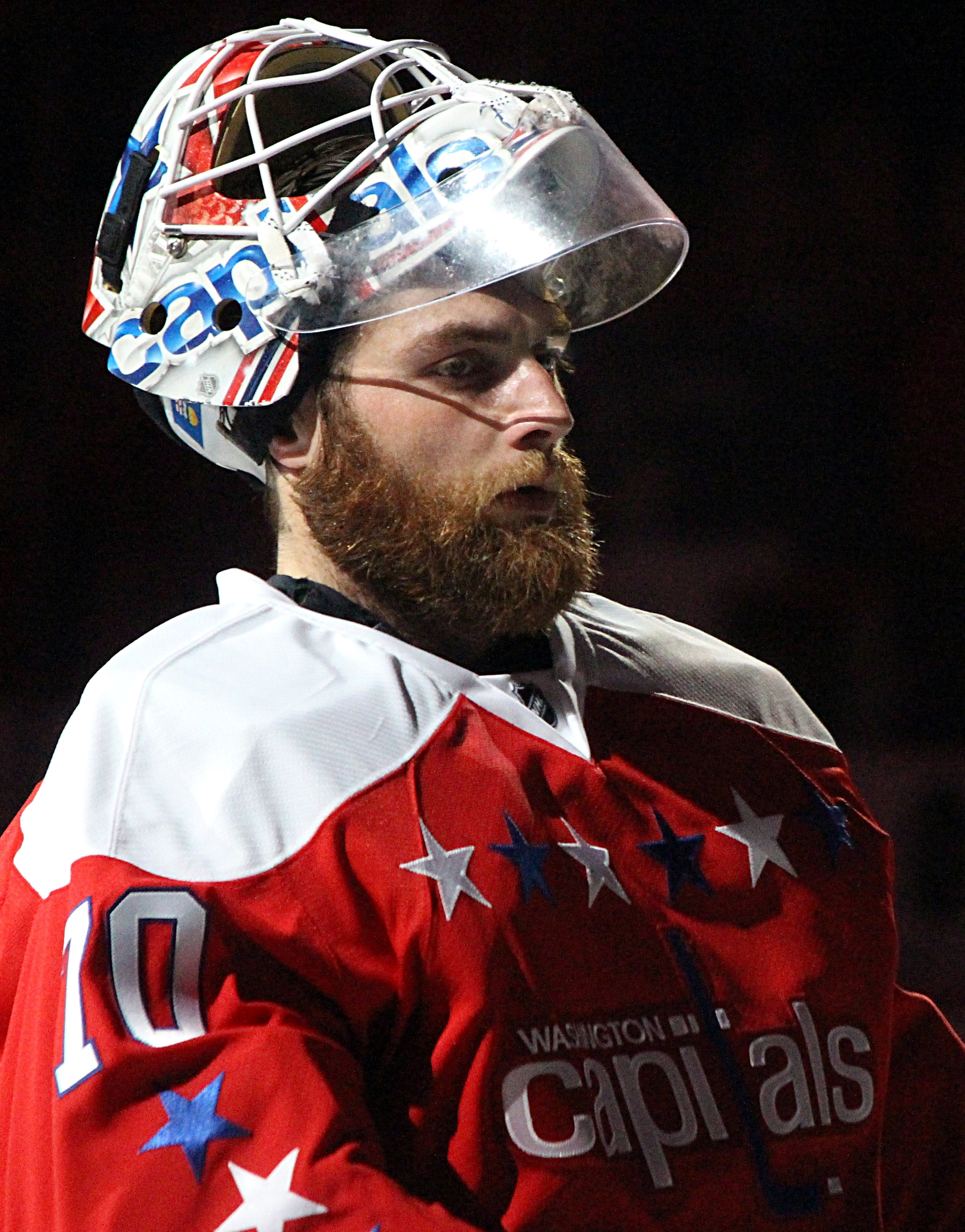
Braden Holtby saved 37 of 39 shots faced in Game 2.

During the first period of game two, James Neal took a pass from Luca Sbisa, firing a wrist shot past Braden Holtby. The Capitals tied the game during a four-on-four when Lars Eller shot into an empty net from Michal Kempny's pass. During the second period, Golden Knights rookie Alex Tuch was penalized for cross-checking, and on the ensuing power-play, Capitals captain Alexander Ovechkin fired a shot from a tight angle to give Washington the lead. Brooks Orpik extended the Capitals' lead to two goals when his shot deflected off Alex Tuch past Marc-Andre Fleury. Vegas cut the deficit by one goal when T. J. Oshie interfered with Colin Miller and Shea Theodore scored on the power-play. In the third period Holtby backstopped Washington to the victory, stopping the final fifteen shots from Vegas, including a diving stick save from Braden Holtby known as "The Save" to win 3–2 for the Capitals's first victory in the Stanley Cup Final.

Scoring summary
Period	Team	Goal	Assist(s)	Time	Score
1st	VGK	James Neal (5)	Luca Sbisa (3), Colin Miller (2)	07:58	1–0 VGK
1st	WSH	Lars Eller (6)	Michal Kempny (3), Andre Burakovsky (2)	17:27	1–1
2nd	WSH	Alexander Ovechkin (13) – pp	Lars Eller (10), Nicklas Backstrom (14)	05:38	2–1 WSH
2nd	WSH	Brooks Orpik (1)	Lars Eller (11), Andre Burakovsky (3)	09:41	3–1 WSH
2nd	VGK	Shea Theodore (3) – pp	Reilly Smith (16), William Karlsson (8)	17:47	3–2 WSH
3rd	None				
Penalty summary
Period	Team	Player	Penalty	Time	PIM
1st	WSH	T. J. Oshie	Roughing	16:43	2:00
1st	VGK	Deryk Engelland	Roughing	16:43	2:00
2nd	WSH	Brooks Orpik	Illegal check to head	02:04	2:00
2nd	VGK	Alex Tuch	Cross-checking	05:13	2:00
2nd	WSH	Nicklas Backstrom	Holding	06:56	2:00
2nd	VGK	Erik Haula	Holding	06:56	2:00
2nd	VGK	Ryan Reaves	Roughing	10:10	2:00
2nd	WSH	Dmitry Orlov	Hooking	11:42	2:00
2nd	WSH	T. J. Oshie	Interference	17:27	2:00
3rd	WSH	Tom Wilson	Interference	03:13	2:00
3rd	WSH	Lars Eller	Hooking	04:05	2:00

Shots by period
Team	1	2	3	Total
WSH	11	9	6	26
VGK	10	14	15	39

=== Game three ===
June 2	Vegas Golden Knights	1–3	Washington Capitals	Capital One Arena	Recap

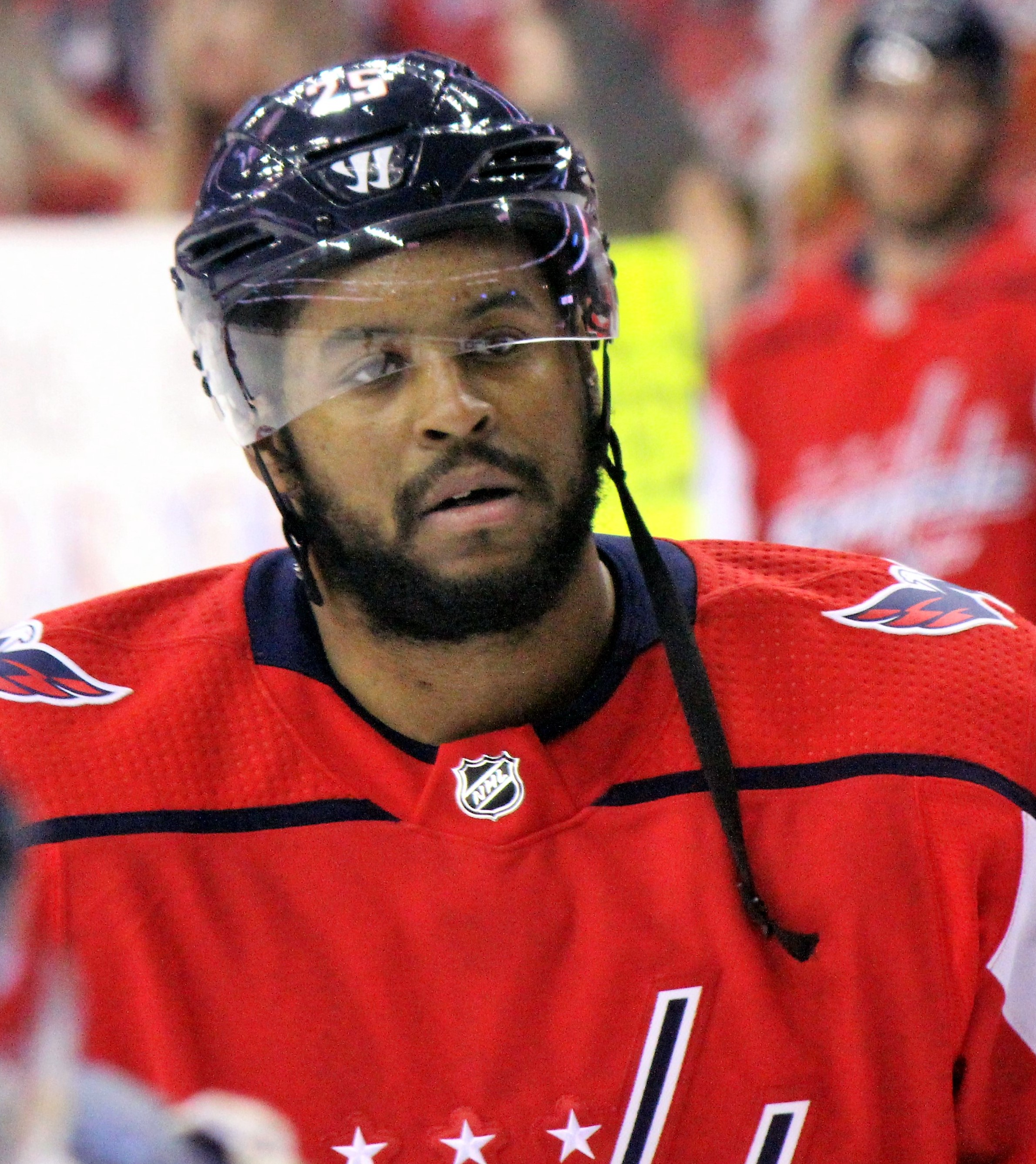
Devante Smith-Pelly began his three-game goal-scoring streak in Game 3.

After a tense first period in which neither team scored, Alexander Ovechkin scored early in the second period to give Washington the lead. Evgeny Kuznetsov, who was believed to have suffered an arm injury the game prior, scored 11:40 after Ovechkin, extending Washington's lead to two. Tomas Nosek scored off of a Braden Holtby giveaway to cut the deficit in half early in the third period. However, 10 minutes later Shea Theodore mishandled the puck in his own zone and Jay Beagle capitalized on the error, making a pass to an open Devante Smith-Pelly who restored the two-goal lead for Washington. The Capitals played defensively for the final minutes of the game to win 3–1, and took the series lead.

Scoring summary
Period	Team	Goal	Assist(s)	Time	Score
1st	None				
2nd	WSH	Alexander Ovechkin (14)	John Carlson (14), Evgeny Kuznetsov (15)	01:10	1–0 WSH
2nd	WSH	Evgeny Kuznetsov (12)	Jay Beagle (5), T. J. Oshie (11)	12:50	2–0 WSH
3rd	VGK	Tomas Nosek (4)	Pierre-Edouard Bellemare (3)	03:29	2–1 WSH
3rd	WSH	Devante Smith-Pelly (5)	Jay Beagle (6)	13:53	3–1 WSH
Penalty summary
Period	Team	Player	Penalty	Time	PIM
1st	WSH	Devante Smith-Pelly	Interference	05:04	2:00
1st	VGK	Reilly Smith	Holding	11:21	2:00
2nd	VGK	Erik Haula	Hooking	09:55	2:00
2nd	WSH	Devante Smith-Pelly	Tripping	18:34	2:00
2nd	VGK	Marc-Andre Fleury (served by Shea Theodore)	Tripping	19:38	2:00
3rd	VGK	Deryk Engelland	Tripping	07:35	2:00

Shots by period
Team	1	2	3	Total
VGK	5	8	9	22
WSH	7	14	5	26

=== Game four ===
June 4	Vegas Golden Knights	2–6	Washington Capitals	Capital One Arena	Recap

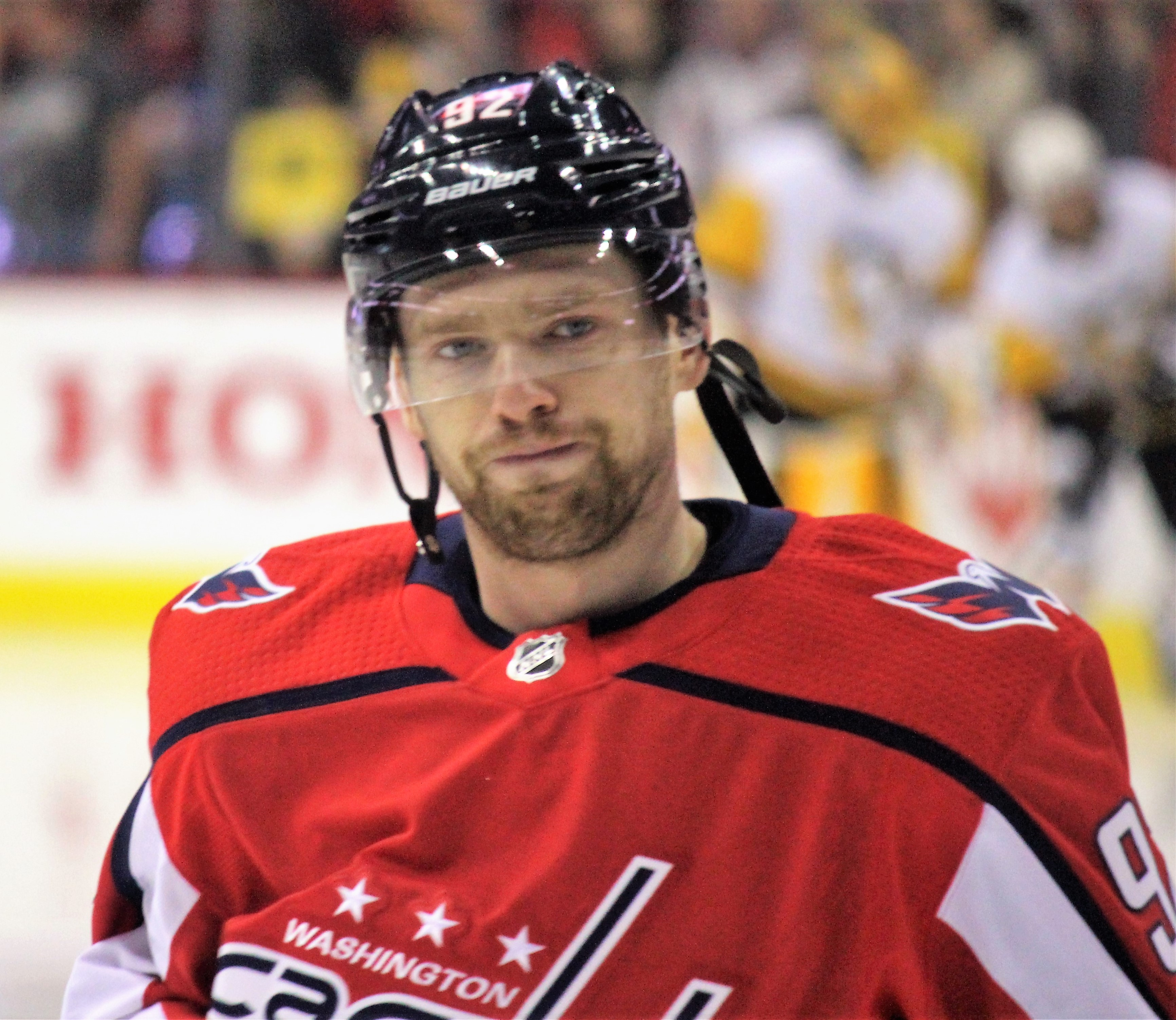
Evgeny Kuznetsov scored four assists in Game 4.

During the first period, a penalty called on Colin Miller for tripping allowed T. J. Oshie to give Washington the first lead. The Capitals extended the lead after Evgeny Kuznetsov fed a pass to Tom Wilson who fired a wrist shot past Marc-Andre Fleury. Devante Smith-Pelly then gave Washington a 3–0 lead after a pass by Matt Niskanen deflected off Vegas forward Jonathan Marchessault to the stick of Smith-Pelly, who scored top-shelf on Fleury. Even with the Golden Knights more than doubling the shots of Washington, John Carlson gave the Capitals a 4–0 lead, firing a slap shot on the power-play. In the third period, Vegas ended the shutout as James Neal scored just as Evgeny Kuznetsov's tripping penalty had expired. Reilly Smith cut the deficit to two goals, scoring on the backhand past Braden Holtby. Washington restored a three-goal lead during a four-on-four; as Nicklas Backstrom fed an open Michal Kempny, firing the shot past Fleury. Brett Connolly added an insurance goal with less than two minutes remaining, giving the Capitals a commanding 6–2 lead.

Scoring summary
Period	Team	Goal	Assist(s)	Time	Score
1st	WSH	T. J. Oshie (8) – pp	Evgeny Kuznetsov (16), Nicklas Backstrom (15)	09:54	1–0 WSH
1st	WSH	Tom Wilson (5)	Evgeny Kuznetsov (17)	16:26	2–0 WSH
1st	WSH	Devante Smith-Pelly (6)	Matt Niskanen (8), Alexander Ovechkin (12)	19:39	3–0 WSH
2nd	WSH	John Carlson (5) – pp	Evgeny Kuznetsov (18), T. J. Oshie (12)	15:23	4–0 WSH
3rd	VGK	James Neal (6)	Erik Haula (6), Colin Miller (3)	05:43	4–1 WSH
3rd	VGK	Reilly Smith (4)	Jonathan Marchessault (12), Luca Sbisa (4)	12:26	4–2 WSH
3rd	WSH	Michal Kempny (2)	Nicklas Backstrom (16), T. J. Oshie (13)	13:39	5–2 WSH
3rd	WSH	Brett Connolly (6) – pp	Nicklas Backstrom (17), Evgeny Kuznetsov (19)	18:51	6–2 WSH
Penalty summary
Period	Team	Player	Penalty	Time	PIM
1st	WSH	John Carlson	Tripping	03:58	2:00
1st	VGK	Colin Miller	Tripping	09:22	2:00
2nd	WSH	John Carlson	Tripping	05:21	2:00
2nd	WSH	Tom Wilson	Cross-checking	09:18	2:00
2nd	VGK	James Neal	Slashing	14:45	2:00
3rd	VGK	Erik Haula	Slashing	01:33	2:00
3rd	WSH	Evgeny Kuznetsov	Tripping	03:42	2:00
3rd	WSH	Tom Wilson	Roughing	13:03	2:00
3rd	VGK	Ryan Reaves	Roughing	13:03	2:00
3rd	VGK	Nate Schmidt	Tripping	16:57	2:00
3rd	VGK	Brayden McNabb	Cross-checking	17:44	2:00
3rd	VGK	Deryk Engelland	Misconduct	17:44	10:00
3rd	WSH	T. J. Oshie	Misconduct	17:44	10:00
3rd	VGK	Ryan Reaves	Misconduct	19:17	10:00

Shots by period
Team	1	2	3	Total
VGK	11	11	9	30
WSH	10	5	7	23

=== Game five ===
June 7	Washington Capitals	4–3	Vegas Golden Knights	T-Mobile Arena	Recap

External videos
- Game 5 Full replay (NHL International's feed) on the NHL's official YouTube channel

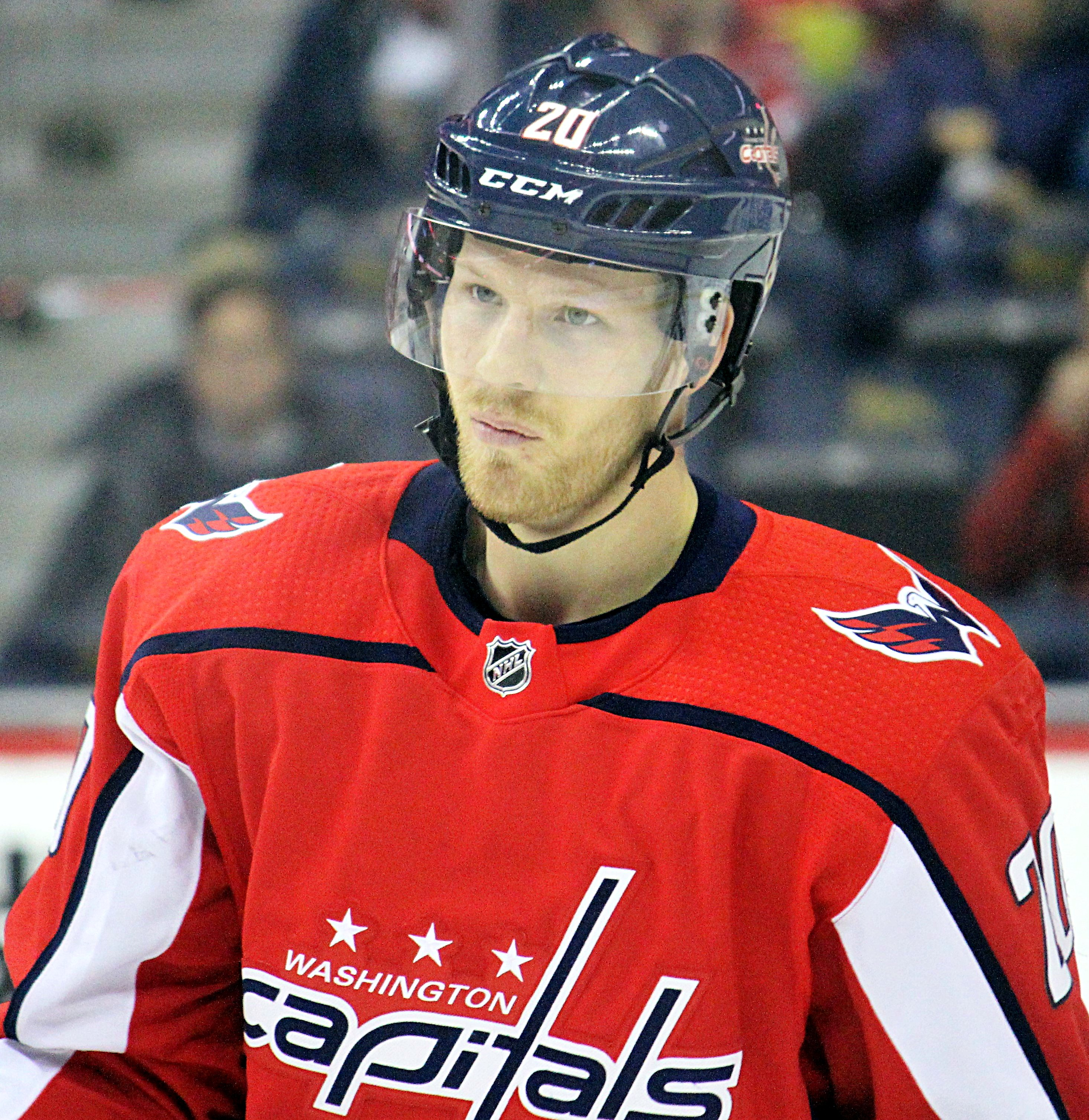
Lars Eller scored the Stanley Cup-clinching goal in Game 5.

Although no goals were scored in the first period, the Capitals had the shot advantage nine to seven. During the second period, Tom Wilson passed to a speedy Jakub Vrana going past the Golden Knight's defender and beating Marc-Andre Fleury to take the lead. The Golden Knights tied the game soon after as former-Capitals defenceman Nate Schmidt shot through a flurry of players and the puck deflected off of Matt Niskanen past Braden Holtby. Alexander Ovechkin gave the Capitals the lead again on the power play, firing a shot onto Fleury, bouncing off his back and into the net. With the goal, it broke a tie with John Druce for most goals in a postseason by a Capitals player with fifteen. David Perron tied the game for Vegas, scoring his first goal of the postseason via deflection. Coach Barry Trotz of the Capitals challenged the play on goaltender interference as Perron appeared to hit the skate of Holtby as he was battling for position; the challenge was unsuccessful. An open Reilly Smith gave the Golden Knights the lead in the final minute of the second period, taking the pass from Alex Tuch. Halfway through the third period, Devante Smith-Pelly tied the game for the Capitals. Less than three minutes later, a shot came from the slot and went between Fleury's pads, but, unbeknownst to Fleury and his defensemen, the puck sneaked through and was lying in view just behind him, and Lars Eller forehanded it into the net to give the Capitals the lead with 7:37 left. With two minutes left, Vegas pulled Fleury for an extra attacker. At 18:11 of the third period, the game clock froze; however, the next stoppage in play occurred at 28.9 seconds remaining, allowing the clock to be readjusted. Nevertheless, the attempts of the Golden Knights were thwarted as the Capitals held on to win the game and their first Stanley Cup. Ovechkin was awarded the Conn Smythe Trophy.

The Capitals' Stanley Cup victory was the first championship won by a team from Washington, D.C. since 1992, when the then-Washington Redskins won Super Bowl XXVI.

Scoring summary
Period	Team	Goal	Assist(s)	Time	Score
1st	None				
2nd	WSH	Jakub Vrana (3)	Tom Wilson (10), Evgeny Kuznetsov (20)	06:24	1–0 WSH
2nd	VGK	Nate Schmidt (3)	Reilly Smith (17), Jonathan Marchessault (13)	09:40	1–1
2nd	WSH	Alexander Ovechkin (15) – pp	Nicklas Backstrom (18), John Carlson	10:14	2–1 WSH
2nd	VGK	David Perron (1)	Tomas Tatar (1), Colin Miller (4)	12:56	2–2
2nd	VGK	Reilly Smith (5) – pp	Alex Tuch (4), Shea Theodore (7)	19:31	3–2 VGK
3rd	WSH	Devante Smith-Pelly (7)	Brooks Orpik (4)	09:52	3–3
3rd	WSH	Lars Eller (7)	Brett Connolly (3), Andre Burakovsky (4)	12:23	4–3 WSH
Penalty summary
Period	Team	Player	Penalty	Time	PIM
1st	VGK	Colin Miller	Interference	11:44	2:00
2nd	VGK	Shea Theodore	Tripping	00:21	2:00
2nd	WSH	Christian Djoos	High sticking	03:19	2:00
2nd	VGK	Brayden McNabb	Tripping	09:51	2:00
2nd	WSH	Alexander Ovechkin	Tripping	17:46	2:00
2nd	WSH	Brooks Orpik	Roughing	19:31	2:00
2nd	VGK	Reilly Smith	Roughing	19:31	2:00
2nd	VGK	Alex Tuch	Roughing	19:31	2:00
2nd	WSH	Jay Beagle	Roughing	19:31	2:00
3rd	VGK	Tomas Tatar	Hooking	05:37	2:00

Shots by period
Team	1	2	3	Total
WSH	9	11	13	33
VGK	7	13	11	31

== Team rosters ==
=== Vegas Golden Knights ===
#	Nat	Player	Position	Hand	Age	Acquired	Place of birth	Finals appearance
3	(Canada)	Brayden McNabb	D	L	27	2017	Davidson, Saskatchewan	first
5	(Canada)	Deryk Engelland – A	D	R	36	2017	Edmonton, Alberta	first
6	(Canada)	Colin Miller	D	R	25	2017	Sault Ste. Marie, Ontario	first
15	(United States)	Jon Merrill	D	L	26	2017	Oklahoma City, Oklahoma	first
18	(Canada)	James Neal – A	RW	L	30	2017	Whitby, Ontario	second (2017)
19	(Canada)	Reilly Smith – A	RW	L	27	2017	Toronto, Ontario	first
21	(Canada)	Cody Eakin	C	L	27	2017	Winnipeg, Manitoba	first
24	(Sweden)	Oscar Lindberg	C	L	26	2017	Skellefteå, Sweden	first
27	(Canada)	Shea Theodore	D	L	22	2017	Langley, British Columbia	first
28	(Canada)	William Carrier	LW	L	23	2017	LaSalle, Quebec	first
29	(Canada)	Marc-Andre Fleury	G	L	33	2017	Sorel-Tracy, Quebec	fifth (2008, 2009, 2016, 2017)
30	(Canada)	Malcolm Subban	G	L	24	2017	Toronto, Ontario	first
33	(Canada)	Maxime Lagace	G	L	25	2017	Saint-Agustin, Quebec	first
40	(United States)	Ryan Carpenter	C	R	27	2017	Oviedo, Florida	first
41	(France)	Pierre-Edouard Bellemare – A	LW	L	33	2017	Le Blanc-Mesnil, France	first
47	(Switzerland)	Luca Sbisa – A	D	L	28	2017	Ozieri, Italy	first
56	(Finland)	Erik Haula	LW	L	27	2017	Pori, Finland	first
57	(Canada)	David Perron – A	LW	R	29	2017	Sherbrooke, Quebec	first
71	(Sweden)	William Karlsson	C	L	25	2017	Märsta, Sweden	first
75	(Canada)	Ryan Reaves	RW	R	31	2018	Winnipeg, Manitoba	first
81	(Canada)	Jonathan Marchessault	C	R	27	2017	Cap-Rouge, Quebec	second (2015)
88	(United States)	Nate Schmidt	D	L	26	2017	St. Cloud, Minnesota	first
89	(United States)	Alex Tuch	RW	R	22	2017	Syracuse, New York	first
90	(Slovakia)	Tomas Tatar	LW	L	27	2018	Ilava, Czechoslovakia	first
92	(Czech Republic)	Tomas Nosek	LW	L	25	2017	Pardubice, Czechoslovakia	first

=== Washington Capitals ===
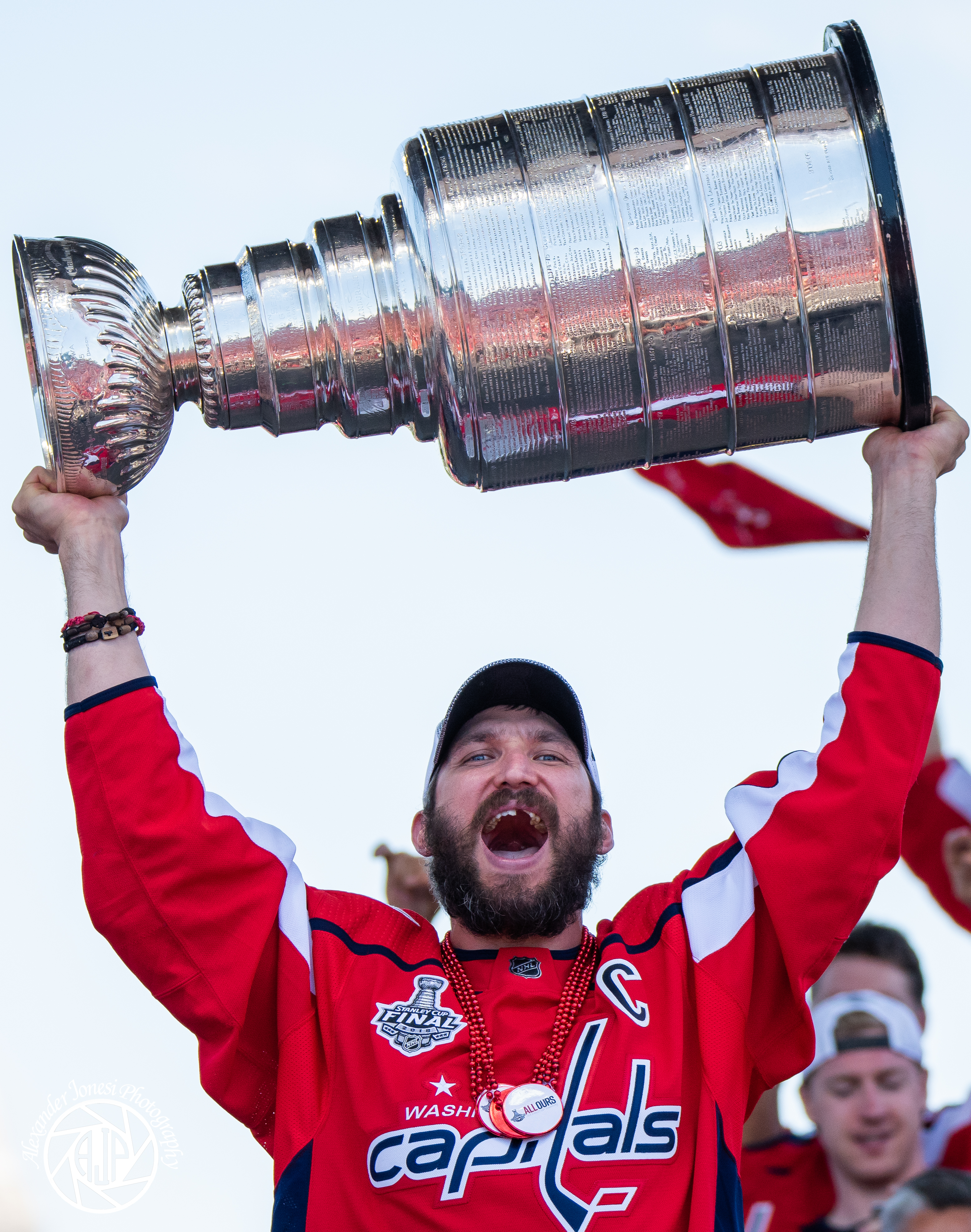
Alexander Ovechkin captained the Capitals to their first Stanley Cup championship in franchise history, winning the Conn Smythe Trophy as the most valuable player of the 2018 playoffs

#	Nat	Player	Position	Hand	Age	Acquired	Place of birth	Finals appearance
2	(United States)	Matt Niskanen	D	R	31	2014	Virginia, Minnesota	first
6	(Czech Republic)	Michal Kempny	D	L	27	2018	Hodonin, Czechoslovakia	first
8	(Russia)	Alexander Ovechkin – C	LW	R	32	2004	Moscow, Soviet Union	first
9	(Russia)	Dmitry Orlov	D	L	26	2009	Novokuznetsk, Soviet Union	first
10	(Canada)	Brett Connolly	RW	R	26	2016	Campbell River, British Columbia	first
13	(Czech Republic)	Jakub Vrana	LW	L	22	2014	Prague, Czech Republic	first
18	(Canada)	Chandler Stephenson	C	L	24	2012	Saskatoon, Saskatchewan	first
19	(Sweden)	Nicklas Backstrom – A	C	L	30	2006	Valbo, Sweden	first
20	(Denmark)	Lars Eller	C	L	29	2016	Rødovre, Denmark	first
22	(Canada)	Madison Bowey	D	R	23	2013	Winnipeg, Manitoba	first (did not play)
25	(Canada)	Devante Smith-Pelly	RW/LW	R	25	2017	Scarborough, Ontario	first
28	(Czech Republic)	Jakub Jerabek	D	L	27	2018	Plzeň, Czechoslovakia	first
29	(Sweden)	Christian Djoos	D	L	23	2012	Gothenburg, Sweden	first
31	(Germany)	Philipp Grubauer	G	L	26	2010	Rosenheim, Germany	first
39	(Canada)	Alex Chiasson	RW	R	27	2017	Montreal, Quebec	first (did not play)
43	(Canada)	Tom Wilson	RW	R	24	2012	Toronto, Ontario	first
44	(United States)	Brooks Orpik – A	D	L	37	2014	San Francisco, California	third (2008, 2009)
63	(United States)	Shane Gersich	LW	L	21	2014	Chaska, Minnesota	first
65	(Sweden)	Andre Burakovsky	LW	L	23	2013	Klagenfurt, Austria	first
70	(Canada)	Braden Holtby	G	L	28	2008	Lloydminster, Saskatchewan	first
72	(United States)	Travis Boyd	C	L	24	2011	Hopkins, Minnesota	first
74	(United States)	John Carlson	D	R	28	2008	Natick, Massachusetts	first
77	(United States)	T. J. Oshie	RW	R	31	2015	Everett, Washington	first
79	(Australia)	Nathan Walker	LW	L	24	2017	Cardiff, Wales	first
83	(Canada)	Jay Beagle	C	R	32	2008	Calgary, Alberta	first
92	(Russia)	Evgeny Kuznetsov	C	L	26	2010	Chelyabinsk, Russia	first

== Stanley Cup engraving ==
The Stanley Cup was presented to Capitals captain Alexander Ovechkin by NHL commissioner Gary Bettman following the Capitals 4–3 win over the Golden Knights in game five.

The following Capitals players and staff had their names engraved on the Stanley Cup:

2017–18 Washington Capitals

=== Players ===
Centres

- 18 Chandler Stephenson*
- 19 Nicklas Backstrom (A)
- 20 Lars Eller
- 83 Jay Beagle
- 92 Evgeny Kuznetsov

Wingers

- 8 Alexander Ovechkin (Captain)
- 10 Brett Connolly
- 13 Jakub Vrana
- 25 Devante Smith-Pelly
- 39 Alex Chiasson †
- 43 Tom Wilson
- 65 Andre Burakovsky
- 77 T. J. Oshie

Defencemen

- 2 Matt Niskanen
- 6 Michal Kempny
- 9 Dmitry Orlov
- 22 Madison Bowey †
- 29 Christian Djoos
- 44 Brooks Orpik (A)
- 74 John Carlson

Goaltenders

- 70 Braden Holtby
- 31 Philipp Grubauer
- * Played both centre and wing.
- † Did not play or dress in the Final.

=== Coaching and administrative staff ===
- Ted Leonsis (Chairman/Majority Owner/Chief Executive Officer/Governor), Dick Patrick (Vice Chairman/Chief Operating Officer/President/Alt. Governor-Minority Owner), Brian MacLellan (Sr. Vice President/General Manager/Alt. Governor)
- Donald Fishman (Asst. General Manager), J. Ross Mahoney (Asst. General Manager), Kristian Wagner (Director of Hockey Operations)
- Christopher Patrick (Director, Player Personnel), Steve Richmond (Director, Player Development), Rob Tillotson (Director of Team Operations)
- Barry Trotz (Head Coach), Todd Reirden (Associate Coach), Blaine Forsythe (Asst. Coach)
- Lane Lambert (Asst. Coach), Brett Leonhardt (Video Coach), Timothy Ohashi (Video Analyst)
- Scott Murray (Goaltending Coach), Mitch Korn (Director of Goaltending), Mark Nemish (Strength & Conditioning Coach), James Serbus (Athletic Trainer)
- Michael Booi (Asst. Athletic Trainer), Brock Myles (Equipment Manager), Craig Leydig (Asst. Equipment Manager), David Marin (Equipment Asst.)
- Steve Bowman (Head Amateur Scout), Jason Fitzsimmons (Pro Scout/Director of Minor League Operations), Ed McColgan (Scout), Martin Pouliot (Scout)
- Brian Sutherby (Scout), Olaf Kolzig (Pro Development Coach), Sergey Kocharov (Vice President of Communications)

=== Engraving notes ===
- #25 Devante Smith-Pelly (RW/LW) was the second player, after Patrice Bergeron-Cleary, to have a hyphenated surname engraved on the trophy.
- #20 Lars Eller (C) was the first Danish-born and trained player to win the Stanley Cup.
- The Cup was full, so a new ring was added to include Washington Capitals members. The top ring with the winners from 1953–54 to 1964–65 (12 teams) was taken off and was placed on permanent display at the Hockey Hall of Fame. Some famous names no longer featured on the Cup include Dickie Moore, Maurice Richard, Jacques Plante, Bert Olmstead, Ted Lindsay, Alex Delvecchio, Gordie Howe, Stan Mikita, Bobby Hull, among others. There are several retired rings at the Hockey Hall of Fame that feature winning team members' names from 1924 to 1965.
- The Patrick family now had seven members who have won the Stanley Cup. Frank won the Cup in 1915. Frank's brother, Lester, won Cups in 1906, 1907, 1925, 1928, 1933 and 1940. In 1940, Lester won his sixth and final Stanley Cup with his sons Lynn and Murray. Lynn's son Craig won two Cups in 1991 and 1992. Murray's son Dick and grandson Christopher both won the Cup in 2018.

=== Included in the team picture, but left off the Stanley Cup ===
- #28 Jakub Jerabek (D) — played 25 games for Montreal, plus 11 regular-season games for Washington and two playoff games (in the first round)
- #72 Travis Boyd (C) — played 8 regular-season games and one playoff game (in the second round)
- #79 Nathan Walker (LW) — played 2 games for Edmonton, plus 7 regular-season games for Washington & one playoff game (in the second round)
- #63 Shane Gersich (LW) — played 3 regular-season games and two playoff games (in the second round)
- #1 Pheonix Copley (G) — played 0 games for Washington, but played 41 games for Hershey (AHL)
- #64 Brian Pinho (C) – 0 regular season and 0 playoff games, 40 games for Providence College
- These six players were on the expanded roster during the playoffs. Washington did not request an exemption for any of their names to be engraved on the Stanley Cup.
- Raul Fernandez (Vice Chairman-Minority Owner), Sheila Johnson (Vice Chairman-Minority Owner)
- Cleo Bates (Massage Therapist), Ray Straccia (Locker Room Asst.)

== Television and radio ==
In Canada, the series was broadcast by Sportsnet and CBC Television in English, and TVA Sports in French. In the U.S., the Finals were split between NBC (Games 1, 4 and 5) and NBCSN (Games 2 and 3).

In the U.S., with an average of 4.918 million viewers across all games, they were the highest-rated Stanley Cup Final without an "Original Six" team since 1994. Game 5 drew 6.714 million viewers, making it the most-watched game 5 since 2002.

Preceded by Pittsburgh Penguins; 2017	Washington Capitals; Stanley Cup champions 2018	Succeeded by St. Louis Blues; 2019
