= Alex Tuch =

American ice hockey player (born 1996)

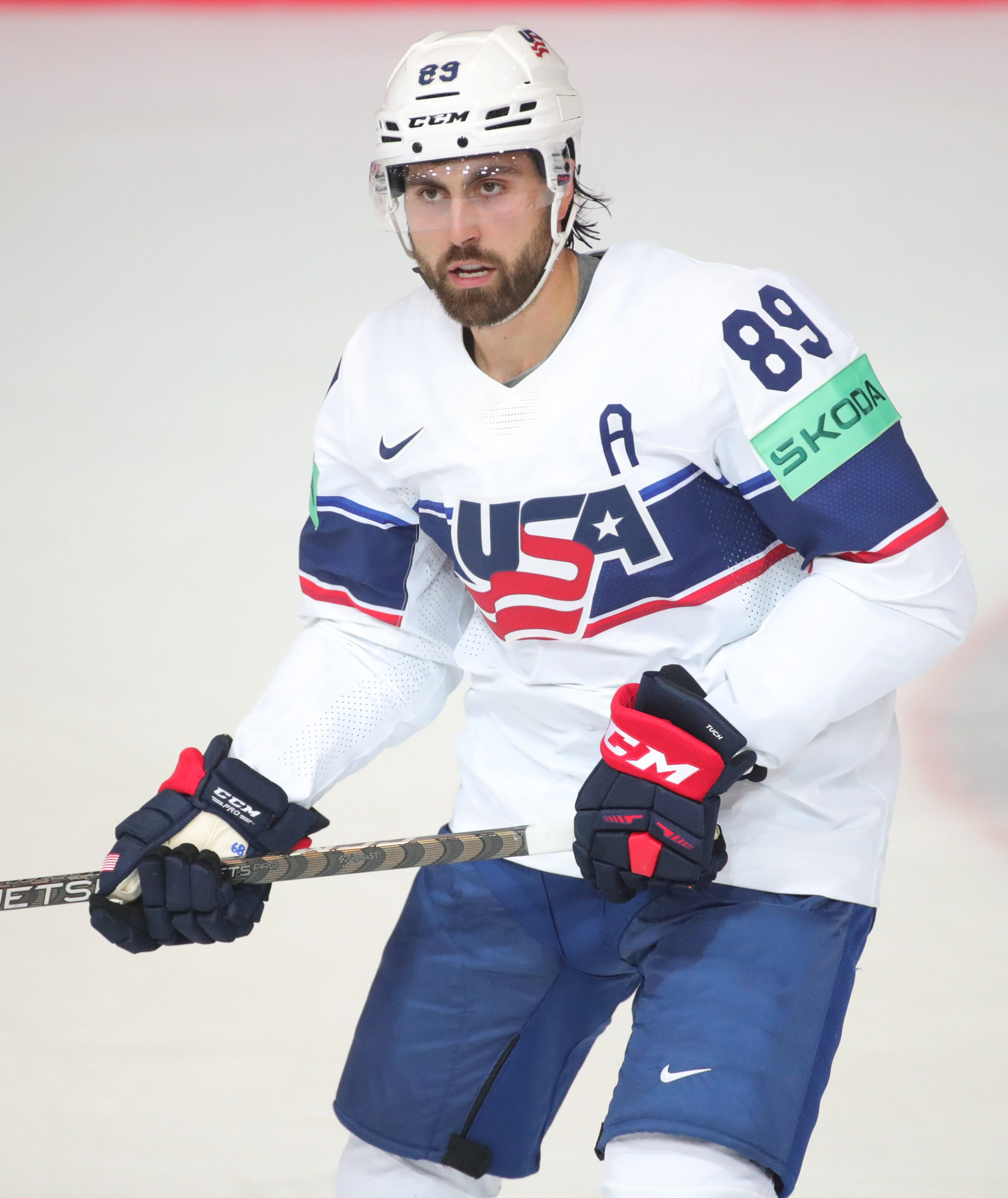
- Tuch in 2023
- Born: May 10, 1996 (age 30) Syracuse, New York, U.S.
- Height: 6 ft 4 in (193 cm)
- Weight: 219 lb (99 kg; 15 st 9 lb)
- Position: Forward
- Shoots: Right
- NHL team Former teams: Washington Capitals; Minnesota Wild; Vegas Golden Knights; Buffalo Sabres
- National team: United States
- NHL draft: 18th overall, 2014; Minnesota Wild
- Playing career: 2016–present

Alex Daniel Tuch (/ˈtʌk/ TUCK; born May 10, 1996) is an American professional ice hockey player who is a forward for the Washington Capitals of the National Hockey League (NHL). He was selected in the first round, 18th overall, by the Minnesota Wild in the 2014 NHL entry draft. Tuch has also previously played for the Vegas Golden Knights and the Buffalo Sabres.

== Playing career ==
=== Youth and college ===
As a youth, Tuch played in the 2008 Quebec International Pee-Wee Hockey Tournament with the Lemieux Academy minor ice hockey team from Phoenix, Arizona. Tuch was ranked 12th by the NHL Central Scouting Bureau on their final list of the top draft-eligible North American skaters leading into the 2014 NHL entry draft, where he was projected to be selected in the first round. Tuch was eventually selected by the Minnesota Wild as the draft's 18th overall pick.

Tuch trained with the USA Hockey National Team Development Program team from 2012 to 2014, winning a bronze medal with Team USA at the 2013 World U-17 Hockey Challenge and gold at the 2014 IIHF World U18 Championships.

From 2014 to 2016, Tuch played college hockey for Boston College in the Hockey East Association. He was named to the 2014–15 Hockey East Association Pro Ambitions All-Rookie Team, tallying 14 goals and 14 assists his freshman year. In 2015–16, he contributed with 18 goals and 16 assists in 40 games, while heading to the NCAA Frozen Four with the Eagles.

=== Minnesota Wild (2016–2017) ===
On April 13, 2016, Tuch signed a three-year, entry-level contract with the Minnesota Wild to begin his professional career. In his rookie professional season, after attending the Wild's training camp, he was reassigned to the club's American Hockey League (AHL) affiliate, the Iowa Wild, for the 2016–17 season. Tuch provided a power-forward presence for Iowa, recording 18 goals and 37 points in 57 games. In the second half of the season, he received his first recall to Minnesota and made his NHL debut on February 4, 2017, against the Vancouver Canucks. That season, he appeared in six NHL games with the Wild, but did not score a goal.

=== Vegas Golden Knights (2017–2021) ===
On June 21, 2017, Tuch was traded to the expansion team Vegas Golden Knights as part of an agreement with the Minnesota Wild that Vegas would select Erik Haula in the 2017 NHL expansion draft. On October 3, 2017, Tuch was assigned to the AHL's Chicago Wolves to begin the 2017–18 season. He was recalled from the Wolves on October 15, and he scored his first NHL goal against Tuukka Rask of the Boston Bruins that night. Tuch went on with Vegas to the 2018 Stanley Cup Final, where they eventually lost in five games to the Washington Capitals.

On October 19, 2018, the Golden Knights signed Tuch to a seven-year, $33.25 million contract extension.

In July 2021, Tuch underwent off-season shoulder surgery, which would prevent him from playing the majority of the 2021–22 NHL season

=== Buffalo Sabres (2021–2026) ===
On November 4, 2021, Tuch was traded by the Golden Knights along with Peyton Krebs, a 2022 first-round draft pick, and a 2023 second-round draft pick to the Buffalo Sabres in exchange for Jack Eichel and a 2023 third-round draft pick. Eichel, the former 2015 second overall draft pick, had been enmeshed in an acrimonious dispute with the Sabres for some time prior to the trade. Tuch, a Sabres fan as a child, expressed enthusiasm about joining the team. He made his debut in a December 29, 2021 loss to the New Jersey Devils, recording an assist. His first goal as a member of the Sabres came in a 4–3 overtime loss to the Boston Bruins on January 1, 2022.

He soon became a fan favorite in Buffalo, with many citing him as a natural choice to the take up the team captaincy previously stripped from Eichel. A notable game came on March 10, 2022, when Eichel made his first appearance in Buffalo against the Golden Knights, culminating in Tuch stealing the puck from Eichel in the final minute to bury it in the empty net, resulting in a 3–1 Sabres victory.

On October 20, 2022, Tuch scored his first career hat-trick in a 6–3 win over the Calgary Flames. He would score his second hat-trick of the season on April 1, 2023, capping it off with a shorthanded goal in another 6–3 win versus the Philadelphia Flyers. Tuch's 2022–23 campaign marked career highs in goals, assists, and points, finding offensive success in his second season playing alongside Tage Thompson and Jeff Skinner.

=== Washington Capitals (2026–present) ===
Upon the expiry of Tuch's contract, there was some speculation that he may return to the Sabres given his hometown status, however, the team and player remained far apart during contract negotiations. On June 24, 2026, as part of a sign-and-trade deal to avoid competition during unrestricted free agency, Tuch signed an eight-year, $84 million contract with the Sabres before being traded to the Washington Capitals in exchange for forward David Kämpf and a 2027 third-round pick.

== Personal life ==
Tuch was born to parents Carl and Sharon in Syracuse, New York and grew up in nearby Baldwinsville. He is of Slovak ancestry through his great grandmother. Tuch has two younger siblings who are fraternal twins; his brother Luke was selected in the second round of the 2020 NHL entry draft by the Montreal Canadiens and currently plays professionally for the Cleveland Monsters of the American Hockey League (AHL), and sister Leah, a field hockey player. Tuch grew up as a fan of the Buffalo Sabres.

== Career statistics ==
=== Regular season and playoffs ===
			Regular season					Playoffs
Season	Team	League	GP	G	A	Pts	PIM	GP	G	A	Pts	PIM
2011–12	Syracuse Jr. Stars	EmJHL	40	44	57	101	26	4	1	3	4	4
2012–13	U.S. NTDP Juniors	USHL	38	4	6	10	24	—	—	—	—	—
2012–13	U.S. NTDP U17	USDP	56	11	15	26	32	—	—	—	—	—
2013–14	U.S. NTDP Juniors	USHL	26	13	19	32	36	—	—	—	—	—
2013–14	U.S. NTDP U18	USDP	61	29	35	64	70	—	—	—	—	—
2014–15	Boston College	HE	37	14	14	28	28	—	—	—	—	—
2015–16	Boston College	HE	40	18	16	34	33	—	—	—	—	—
2016–17	Iowa Wild	AHL	57	18	19	37	28	—	—	—	—	—
2016–17	Minnesota Wild	NHL	6	0	0	0	0	—	—	—	—	—
2017–18	Chicago Wolves	AHL	3	4	1	5	0	—	—	—	—	—
2017–18	Vegas Golden Knights	NHL	78	15	22	37	27	20	6	4	10	12
2018–19	Vegas Golden Knights	NHL	74	20	32	52	8	7	1	1	2	8
2019–20	Vegas Golden Knights	NHL	42	8	9	17	8	20	8	4	12	8
2020–21	Vegas Golden Knights	NHL	55	18	15	33	28	19	4	5	9	6
2021–22	Buffalo Sabres	NHL	50	12	26	38	14	—	—	—	—	—
2022–23	Buffalo Sabres	NHL	74	36	43	79	20	—	—	—	—	—
2023–24	Buffalo Sabres	NHL	75	22	37	59	54	—	—	—	—	—
2024–25	Buffalo Sabres	NHL	82	36	31	67	47	—	—	—	—	—
2025–26	Buffalo Sabres	NHL	79	33	33	66	57	13	4	3	7	8
NHL totals			615	200	248	448	263	79	23	17	40	42

=== International ===
Year	Team	Event	Result	GP	G	A	Pts	PIM
2013	United States	U17	3rd place, bronze medalist(s)	6	1	3	4	4
2014	United States	U18	1st place, gold medalist(s)	7	0	3	3	14
2015	United States	WJC	5th	5	1	1	2	0
2023	United States	WC	4th	10	5	3	8	4
Junior totals				18	2	7	9	18
Junior totals				10	5	3	8	4

Awards and achievements
Preceded by Matt Dumba	Minnesota Wild first-round draft pick 2014	Succeeded by Joel Eriksson Ek
