= Colin Miller (ice hockey, born 1992) =

Canadian ice hockey player (born 1992)

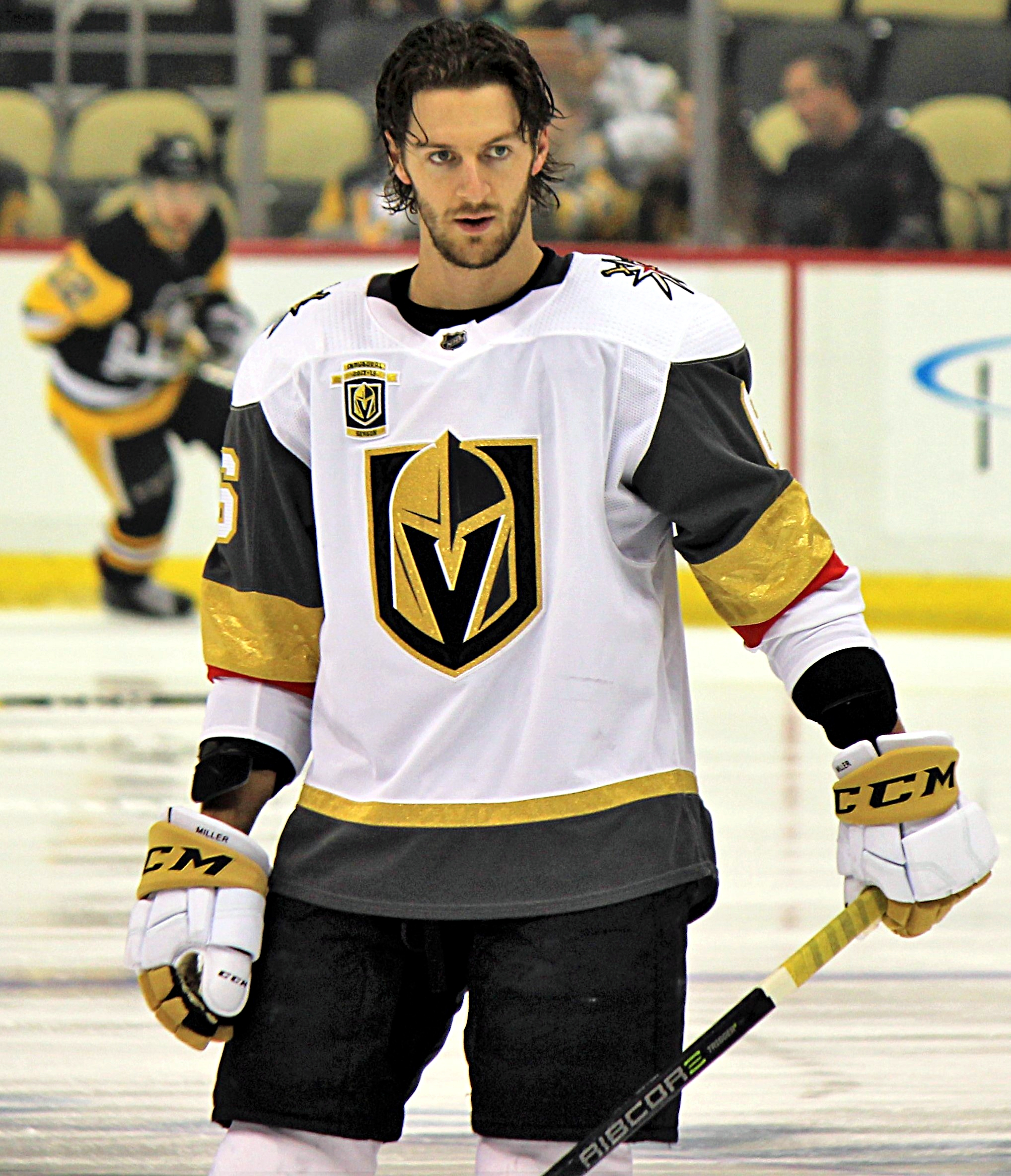
- Miller with the Vegas Golden Knights in 2018
- Born: October 29, 1992 (age 33) Sault Ste. Marie, Ontario, Canada
- Height: 6 ft 1 in (185 cm)
- Weight: 196 lb (89 kg; 14 st 0 lb)
- Position: Defence
- Shoots: Right
- NL team Former teams: Lausanne HC; Boston Bruins; Vegas Golden Knights; Buffalo Sabres; Dallas Stars; New Jersey Devils; Winnipeg Jets
- National team: Canada
- NHL draft: 151st overall, 2012; Los Angeles Kings
- Playing career: 2013–present

Colin Miller (born October 29, 1992) is a Canadian professional ice hockey player who is a defenceman for Lausanne HC of the National League (NL). He previously played in the National Hockey League (NHL) for the Boston Bruins, Vegas Golden Knights, Buffalo Sabres, Dallas Stars, New Jersey Devils and Winnipeg Jets. Miller was selected in the fifth round, 151st overall, by the Los Angeles Kings in the 2012 NHL entry draft.

== Playing career ==
=== Junior ===
Miller played three seasons (2010–2013) of major junior hockey with the Sault Ste. Marie Greyhounds of the Ontario Hockey League (OHL), recording 31 goals and 74 assists for 105 points, while earning 201 penalty minutes, in 174 games played. At the conclusion of the 2012–13 OHL season he was selected to receive the Mickey Renaud Captain's Trophy as the OHL team captain that best exemplifies leadership on and off the ice.

=== Professional ===
==== Los Angeles Kings (2013–2015) ====
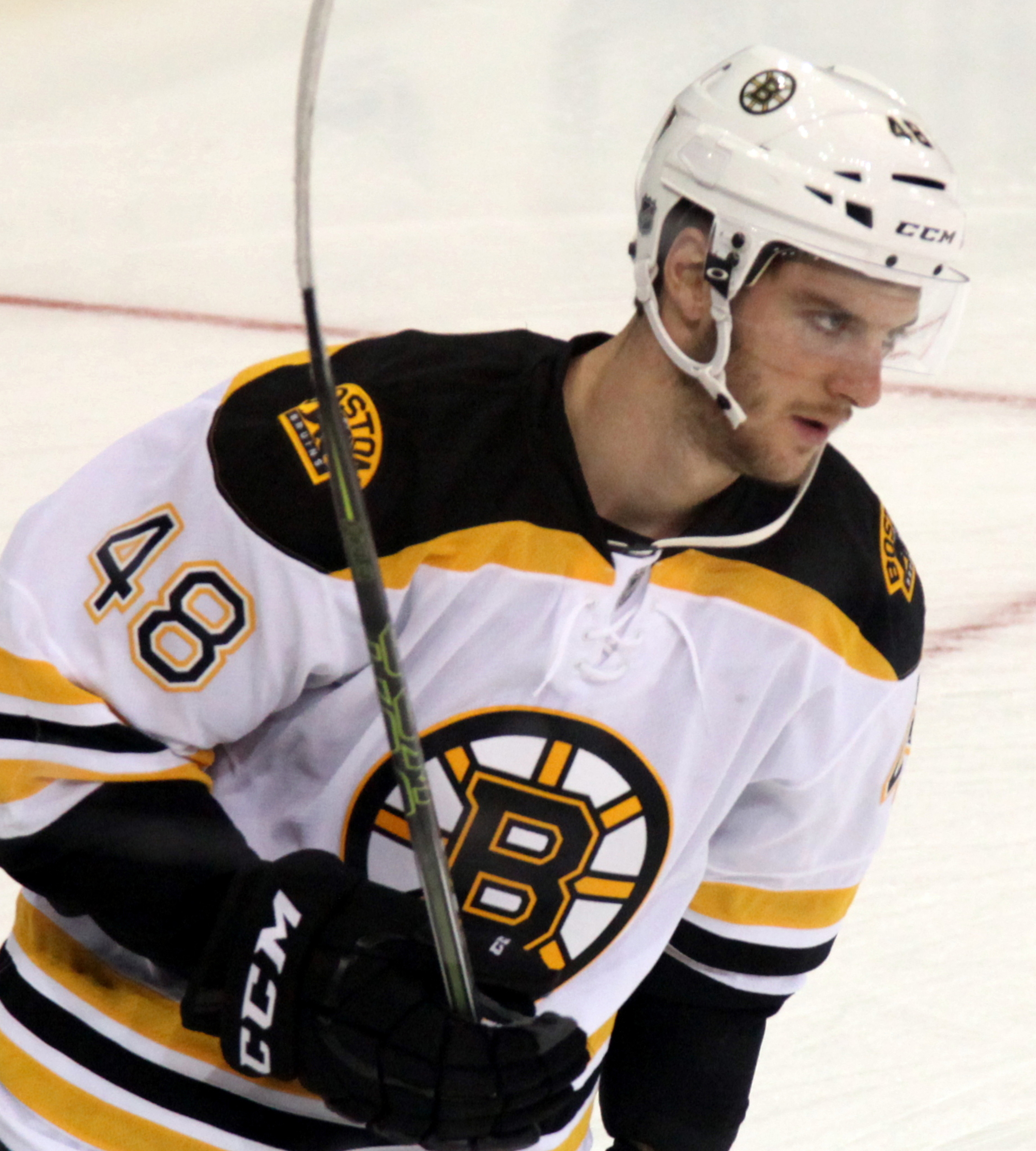
Miller in September 2015

On July 29, 2013, the Los Angeles Kings of the National Hockey League (NHL) signed Miller to a three-year, entry-level contract.

During the 2014–15 season, on January 25, 2015, at the AHL All-Star Skills Competition in Utica, New York, Miller won the fastest skater competition, then proceeded to set the AHL record for hardest shot, clocking at 105.5 miles per hour.

==== Boston Bruins (2015–2017) ====
On June 26, 2015, Miller was traded by the Kings along with Martin Jones and the 13th overall selection (Jakub Zbořil) in the 2015 NHL entry draft to the Boston Bruins in exchange for Milan Lucic. After playing one season in the Bruins' organization, he signed a two-year contract extension worth $2 million.

==== Vegas Golden Knights (2017–2019) ====
Having been exposed by the Bruins to the 2017 NHL Expansion Draft, Miller was selected by the Vegas Golden Knights on June 21, 2017.

On May 28, 2018, Miller scored the first-ever Stanley Cup Final goal in the Golden Knights' history during the first period of game one of the 2018 Stanley Cup Final. During game four of the Stanley Cup Final, Miller was hit in the face by T. J. Oshie subsequently breaking his nose. The Washington Capitals ended up winning the Stanley Cup the following game. Miller ended both the regular and postseason setting career highs in goals, assists, and points.

==== Buffalo Sabres (2019–2022) ====
On June 28, 2019, the Golden Knights traded Miller to the Buffalo Sabres in exchange for a 2021 second-round pick and a 2022 fifth-round pick.

==== Dallas Stars (2022–2023) ====
On July 13, 2022, the Dallas Stars signed Miller as a free agent from the Sabres on a two-year, $3.7 million contract. In the 2022–23 season, Miller established himself in a top-four role within Stars blueline and contributed with six goals and 15 assists for 21 points through 79 regular season games. He made 10 playoff appearances, as the Stars reached the Western Conference finals.

==== New Jersey Devils (2023–2024) ====
On the opening day of free agency, Miller was traded by the Stars to the New Jersey Devils in exchange for a 2025 fifth-round pick on July 1, 2023.

==== Winnipeg Jets (2024–2026) ====
On March 8, 2024, the Devils traded Miller to the Winnipeg Jets in exchange for a 2026 fourth-round pick.

In the final season of his contract with the Jets in 2025–26, Miller was limited to just 18 appearances largely through injury contributing with just 2 assists.

==== Lausanne HC ====
After completing his 11th season in the NHL, Miller as a pending free agent from the Jets, opted to sign his first contract abroad in agreeing to a one-year contract with Swiss club, Lausanne HC of the NL, on June 30, 2026.

== Career statistics ==
=== Regular season and playoffs ===
			Regular season					Playoffs
Season	Team	League	GP	G	A	Pts	PIM	GP	G	A	Pts	PIM
2008–09	Sault Ste. Marie North Stars AAA	GNML	32	6	15	21	42	10	2	7	9	14
2009–10	Soo Thunderbirds	NOJHL	46	7	23	30	38	14	5	9	14	6
2010–11	Sault Ste. Marie Greyhounds	OHL	66	3	19	22	44	—	—	—	—	—
2011–12	Sault Ste. Marie Greyhounds	OHL	54	8	20	28	79	—	—	—	—	—
2012–13	Sault Ste. Marie Greyhounds	OHL	54	20	35	55	78	6	1	6	7	0
2013–14	Manchester Monarchs	AHL	65	5	12	17	35	3	0	0	0	6
2014–15	Manchester Monarchs	AHL	70	19	33	52	82	19	2	8	10	12
2015–16	Boston Bruins	NHL	42	3	13	16	39	—	—	—	—	—
2015–16	Providence Bruins	AHL	20	4	8	12	16	2	0	0	0	0
2016–17	Boston Bruins	NHL	61	6	7	13	55	4	0	1	1	2
2017–18	Vegas Golden Knights	NHL	82	10	31	41	53	20	3	4	7	14
2018–19	Vegas Golden Knights	NHL	65	3	26	29	44	6	1	2	3	6
2019–20	Buffalo Sabres	NHL	51	1	10	11	22	—	—	—	—	—
2020–21	Buffalo Sabres	NHL	48	4	8	12	27	—	—	—	—	—
2021–22	Buffalo Sabres	NHL	38	2	12	14	21	—	—	—	—	—
2022–23	Dallas Stars	NHL	79	6	15	21	37	10	0	1	1	4
2023–24	New Jersey Devils	NHL	41	4	4	8	24	—	—	—	—	—
2023–24	Winnipeg Jets	NHL	5	0	1	1	2	1	0	1	1	0
2024–25	Winnipeg Jets	NHL	60	4	11	15	38	4	0	2	2	4
2025–26	Winnipeg Jets	NHL	18	0	2	2	6	—	—	—	—	—
NHL totals			590	43	140	183	368	45	4	11	15	30

Medal record

Representing Canada

Men's ice hockey

World Championships
Gold medal – first place	2021 Latvia	

=== International ===
Year	Team	Event	Result	GP	G	A	Pts	PIM
2021	Canada	WC	1st place, gold medalist(s)	10	0	2	2	0
Senior totals				10	0	2	2	0

== Awards and honours ==
Award	Year	Ref
OHL
Mickey Renaud Captain's Trophy	2012–13	
AHL
Second All-Star Team	2014–15	
Calder Cup champion	2015	
