= Jay Beagle =

Canadian ice hockey player (born 1985)

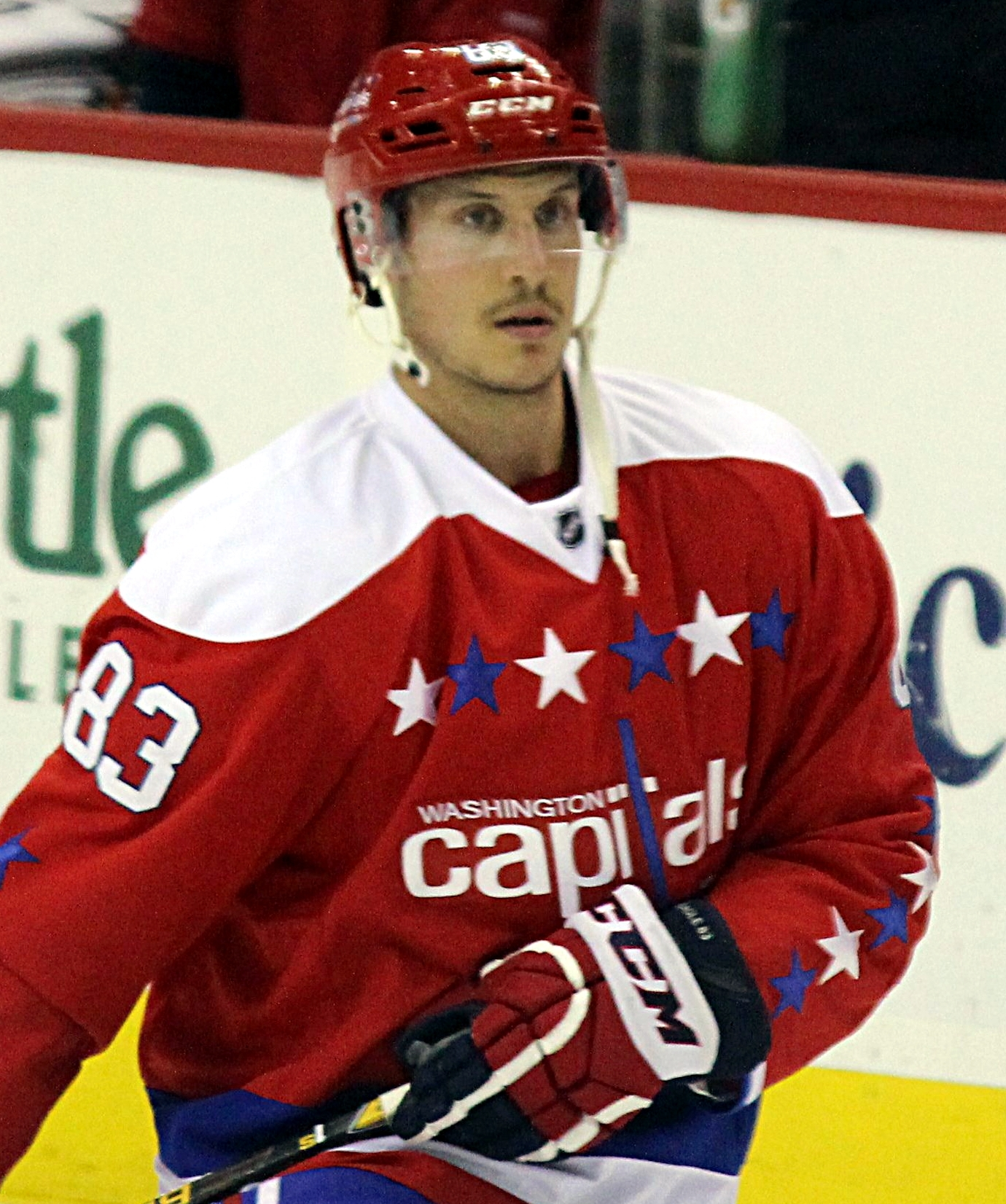
- Beagle with the Washington Capitals in April 2016
- Born: October 16, 1985 (age 41) Calgary, Alberta, Canada
- Height: 6 ft 3 in (191 cm)
- Weight: 215 lb (98 kg; 15 st 5 lb)
- Position: Centre
- Shot: Right
- Played for: Washington Capitals; Vancouver Canucks; Arizona Coyotes
- NHL draft: Undrafted
- Playing career: 2007–2022

Jay Beagle (born October 16, 1985) is a Canadian former professional ice hockey centre who last played for the Arizona Coyotes of the National Hockey League (NHL). As an undrafted free agent, Beagle joined the Washington Capitals' organization for the 2007–08 season. He eventually made his NHL debut on February 11, 2009, and joined the team full time during their 2010–11 season. He concluded his tenure with the Capitals after winning his first Stanley Cup, where he became the first player to win the Kelly Cup (ECHL), Calder Cup (AHL), and the Stanley Cup (NHL). Following his Stanley Cup win, Beagle left the Capitals organization and joined the Vancouver Canucks. In July 2021, Beagle was acquired by the Coyotes in a multi-player trade.

== Early life ==
Beagle was born on October 16, 1985, in Calgary, Alberta, to parents Al and Sue Beagle. He grew up in Calgary alongside his younger siblings Steve and Jen, and worked in his father's auto garage during high school.

== Playing career ==
=== Junior ===
Growing up in Calgary, Alberta, Beagle played for the Simons Valley minor-hockey association and won the 2003 Air Canada Cup as a member of the Midget-AAA Calgary Northstars. After being released from his tryout with the Calgary Hitmen of the Western Hockey League, he then played for the Calgary Royals of the Alberta Junior Hockey League (AJHL) from 2003 to 2005. During the 2003–04 season, he ranked third on the team in goals and second in power-play goals, earning the Royals’ Top Rookie Award and Most Inspirational Award. While playing with the team, Beagle also changed tires in the garage and wired houses for an electrical company to earn money.

Beagle then played for the University of Alaska Anchorage's men's ice hockey from 2005 until 2007. While playing for the Seawolves, Beagle recorded 20 points in his sophomore season and 10 points in his rookie season. As a youth, he began playing the position of a defensive forward but focused his skill as a two-way player during college. He specifically focused on penalty killing and playing defensively.

=== Professional ===
Following his sophomore season, Beagle chose to leave college and pursue a career playing professional hockey. He also explained that he was "struggling in school a little bit to juggle hockey with school and weight training." His father Al began calling ECHL teams urging them to try out his son. He eventually earned a tryout with the Idaho Steelheads for the 2006–07 season. Beagle played eight games with the team to conclude their regular season and helped them make their Kelly Cup run. While playing in Las Vegas during the playoffs, Beagle met Steve Richmond, Washington Capitals’ director of player development, who offered him a tryout at their development camp. Beagle scored one goal and two assists for the Steelheads during their 18-game playoff games to win the Kelly Cup championship.

==== Washington Capitals ====
The following year, Beagle played 64 games for the Hershey Bears of the American Hockey League scoring 37 points. His first AHL goal, a shorthanded goal, came during a game against the Bridgeport Sound Tigers on November 5, 2007. By December, Beagle was tied for fourth in the league in rookie goal scoring with nine. He later praised the coaching of Bruce Boudreau for his increased offensive ability during the season, saying "[h]e pushed me hard and made sure he got 100% out of me every practice and every game." Beagle subsequently signed a two-year entry-level contract with the Capitals for the 2008–09 season.

Following the signing, Beagle attended the Capitals summer camp and training camp prior to the 2008–09 season. He competed with the Capitals during their pre-season game, playing alongside Oskar Osala and Andrew Gordon. In his pre-season debut, Beagle played 16:11 minutes and had one shot on goal. He was eventually re-assigned to the Bears to begin the season and played 25 games for the team before being recalled to the NHL level due to an injury to Alexander Semin. Upon returning to the Bears, Beagle helped the team qualify for the 2009 Calder Cup playoffs and win the Calder Cup by recording one goal and three assists.

On November 17, 2009, Beagle recorded his first NHL point, an assist on Matt Bradley's game-winning goal in the team's 4-2 win over the New York Rangers, and on November 23, he scored his first NHL goal, an unassisted tally against the Ottawa Senators. At the conclusion of the season, Beagle signed a two-year contract to remain with the Capitals organization.

In the 2010–11 season, Beagle began the year with the Hershey Bears before he was recalled from the AHL on December 15, 2010.

During the Capitals exit interview, teammate Brooks Laich urged the coaching staff to give Beagle a regular role with the team. However, on October 13, 2011, Beagle suffered a concussion during a fight against Pittsburgh Penguins' Arron Asham and he missed 31 games to recover.

On July 5, 2012, Beagle was signed to a three-year extension with the Capitals. Beagle continued his tenure with the Capitals in further signing another three-year extension worth $5.25 million on June 29, 2015.

When the Washington Capitals won the Stanley Cup on June 7, 2018, Beagle became the only player to have won championships in the ECHL (2007), AHL (2009 and 2010) and NHL (2018).

==== Vancouver Canucks ====
Having left the Capitals as a free agent after 11 seasons within the organization, on July 1, 2018, Beagle signed a four-year, $12 million contract with the Vancouver Canucks. In his first month with the team, Beagle suffered a broken forearm during a game against the Florida Panthers and missed 24 games to recover.

==== Arizona Coyotes ====
On July 23, 2021, Beagle was traded, along with Loui Eriksson, Antoine Roussel, a 2021 first-round pick, a 2022 second-round pick and a 2023 seventh-round pick, to the Arizona Coyotes in exchange for Oliver Ekman-Larsson and Conor Garland.

== Personal life ==
Beagle is a Christian. Beagle married his high school sweetheart Ashley in 2009, and together they have two sons and a daughter. During the summer, Beagle runs a ball hockey camp in his hometown.

== Career statistics ==
			Regular season					Playoffs
Season	Team	League	GP	G	A	Pts	PIM	GP	G	A	Pts	PIM
2001–02	Calgary Northstars AAA	AMHL	4	0	4	4	6	—	—	—	—	—
2002–03	Calgary Northstars AAA	AMHL	36	20	24	44	34	13	7	1	8	—
2003–04	Calgary Royals	AJHL	58	10	27	37	100	—	—	—	—	—
2004–05	Calgary Royals	AJHL	64	28	42	70	114	—	—	—	—	—
2005–06	University of Alaska Anchorage	WCHA	31	4	6	10	40	—	—	—	—	—
2006–07	University of Alaska Anchorage	WCHA	36	10	10	20	93	—	—	—	—	—
2006–07	Idaho Steelheads	ECHL	8	2	8	10	4	18	1	2	3	22
2007–08	Hershey Bears	AHL	64	19	18	37	41	5	0	1	1	2
2008–09	Hershey Bears	AHL	47	4	5	9	37	18	1	3	4	16
2008–09	Washington Capitals	NHL	3	0	0	0	2	4	0	0	0	0
2009–10	Hershey Bears	AHL	66	16	19	35	25	21	2	7	9	0
2009–10	Washington Capitals	NHL	7	1	1	2	2	—	—	—	—	—
2010–11	Hershey Bears	AHL	34	8	6	14	26	—	—	—	—	—
2010–11	Washington Capitals	NHL	31	2	1	3	8	—	—	—	—	—
2011–12	Washington Capitals	NHL	41	4	1	5	23	12	1	1	2	4
2012–13	Washington Capitals	NHL	48	2	6	8	14	7	1	0	1	4
2013–14	Washington Capitals	NHL	62	4	5	9	28	—	—	—	—	—
2014–15	Washington Capitals	NHL	62	10	10	20	20	14	1	4	5	4
2015–16	Washington Capitals	NHL	57	8	9	17	24	12	3	0	3	2
2016–17	Washington Capitals	NHL	81	13	17	30	22	13	0	0	0	4
2017–18	Washington Capitals	NHL	79	7	15	22	16	23	2	6	8	8
2018–19	Vancouver Canucks	NHL	57	3	10	13	18	—	—	—	—	—
2019–20	Vancouver Canucks	NHL	55	2	6	8	38	17	1	1	2	10
2020–21	Vancouver Canucks	NHL	30	1	4	5	8	—	—	—	—	—
2021–22	Arizona Coyotes	NHL	33	1	1	2	27	—	—	—	—	—
NHL totals			646	58	86	144	250	102	9	12	21	36

== Awards and honours ==
Award	Year
ECHL
Kelly Cup champion	2007
AHL
Calder Cup champion	2009, 2010
NHL
Stanley Cup champion	2018
