= Blaine Forsythe =

Canadian ice hockey coach

- Born: 1976 (age 49–50); Canada
- Occupation: Assistant Coach
- Employer: Utah Mammoth

Blaine Forsythe is a Canadian ice hockey coach. He is currently an assistant coach with the Utah Mammoth of the National Hockey League (NHL). He was previously an assistant coach with the Washington Capitals and the Arizona Coyotes of the National Hockey League (NHL).

Forsythe joined the Washington Capitals organization as a video coach prior to the start of the 2006–07 NHL season. On June 24, 2013, Forsythe was promoted to serve as an assistant coach. Forsythe won the Stanley Cup with the Capitals in 2018. He was with the Capitals until April 2023. He was hired as an assistant coach with the Arizona Coyotes in July 2023. The franchise moved to Utah before the 2024-25 NHL season.
