= Mitch Korn =

American ice hockey player and coach

Mitch Korn (born September 16, 1957 in the Bronx, New York), is a professional ice hockey goaltending coach and former goaltender. Korn is currently the director of goaltending for the Nashville Predators of the NHL. Korn was previously the director of goaltending for the New York Islanders of the National Hockey League (NHL). Prior to the Islanders, Korn spent four seasons as the goaltending coach of the Washington Capitals and 16 years as the goaltending coach for the Nashville Predators under head coach Barry Trotz. In April 2014, the Predators decided not to renew Trotz's coaching contract, which set to expire that summer. Korn's contract was also set to expire that summer (June 30), and he chose to continue his professional relationship with Trotz (with whom he had worked since 1998) over renewing his contract with the Predators. Korn followed Trotz to Washington and replaced incumbent goaltending coach Olaf Kölzig, who stayed on with the Capitals in an unspecified role. Ben Vanderklok replaced Korn as the Predators' goaltending coach.

== Playing career ==
Korn played junior hockey for the Springfield Olympics (MA) and won a National Championship in 1976. He played college hockey at Kent State University while earning BS and MBA degrees there. [1]

== Coaching career ==
Korn joined Miami University in January 1981 as assistant coach of the hockey team and ice arena administrator. During this period, Korn coached Steve McKichan, who, after a brief NHL career, eventually became the goaltending coach of the Toronto Maple Leafs.

Korn was hired by the Buffalo Sabres in 1991, where he coached Dominik Hašek to four Vezina Trophies (awarded to the NHL's best goaltender) and two Hart Memorial Trophies (awarded to the NHL's most valuable player in the regular season) over seven seasons. Korn later joined the Nashville Predators in 1998 as their goaltending coach.

During his career, Korn has coached a variety of NHL goaltenders, including Dominik Hašek, Thomas Greiss, Robin Lehner, Pekka Rinne, Grant Fuhr, Martin Biron, Tomáš Vokoun, Chris Mason, Philipp Grubauer, Semyon Varlamov, Vítek Vaněček, Dan Ellis, Ilya Sorokin and Braden Holtby.
