= Devante Smith-Pelly =

Canadian ice hockey player (born 1992)

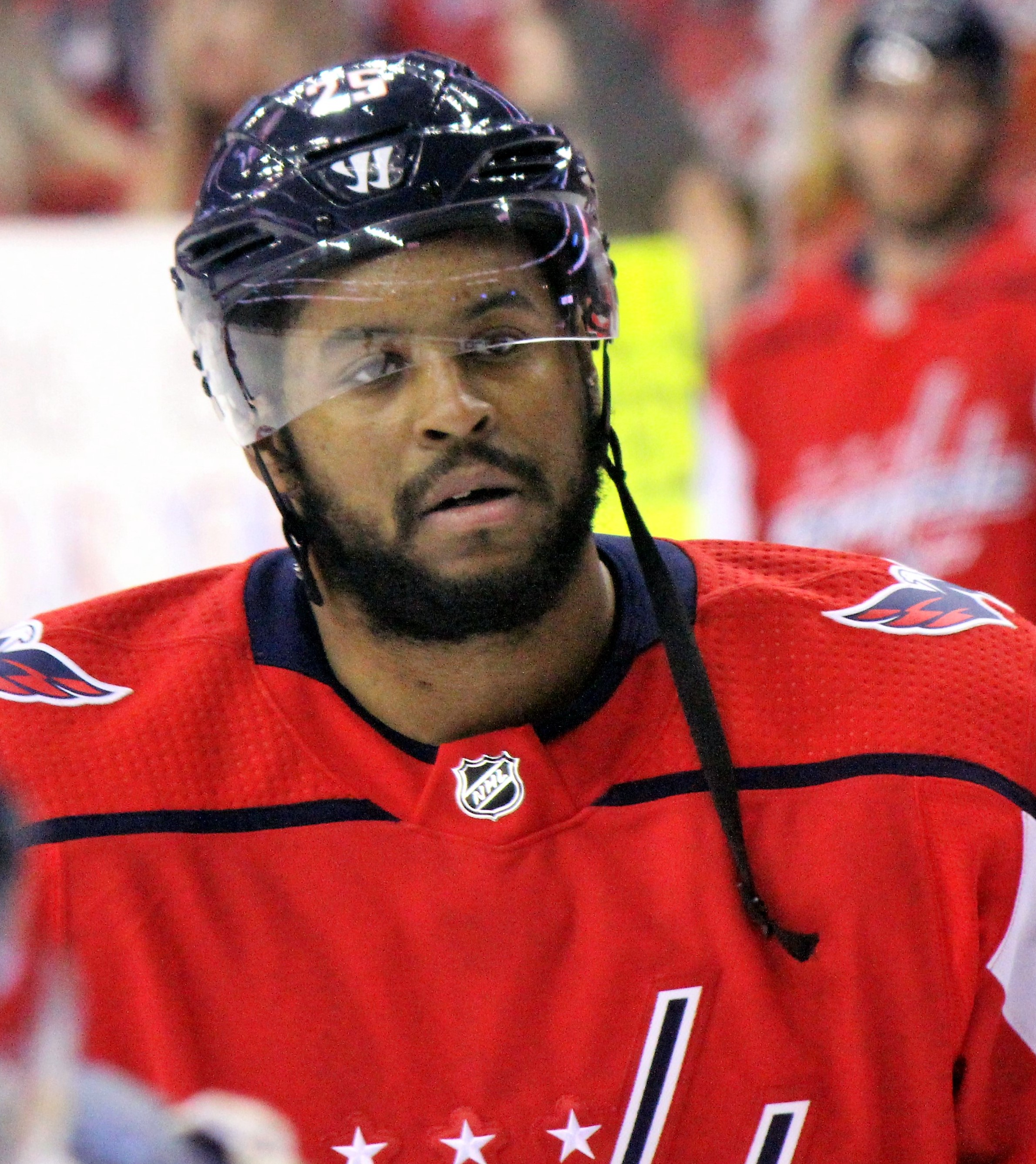
- Smith-Pelly with the Washington Capitals in April 2018
- Born: June 14, 1992 (age 34) Scarborough, Ontario, Canada
- Height: 6 ft 0 in (183 cm)
- Weight: 223 lb (101 kg; 15 st 13 lb)
- Position: Right wing
- Shot: Right
- Played for: Anaheim Ducks; Montreal Canadiens; New Jersey Devils; Washington Capitals; Kunlun Red Star
- NHL draft: 42nd overall, 2010; Anaheim Ducks
- Playing career: 2011–2022

Devante Malik Smith-Pelly (born June 14, 1992) is a Canadian former professional ice hockey player. A winger, he was selected by the Anaheim Ducks in the second round, 42nd overall, of the 2010 NHL entry draft. Smith-Pelly played in the style of a power forward and was known for his hitting and forechecking abilities. Smith-Pelly won the Stanley Cup as a member of the Capitals in 2018.

== Playing career ==
=== Junior ===
Smith-Pelly began his major junior career in 2008–09, recording 25 points over 57 games with the Mississauga St. Michael's Majors of the Ontario Hockey League (OHL). During the 2009 playoffs, he added five points over 11 games. One of his two goals ended the second-longest game in OHL history, as he scored in triple-overtime to eliminate the Barrie Colts in the conference quarterfinals. The following season, he improved to 62 points over 60 games. In the subsequent summer, he was selected 42nd overall by the Anaheim Ducks in the 2010 NHL entry draft.

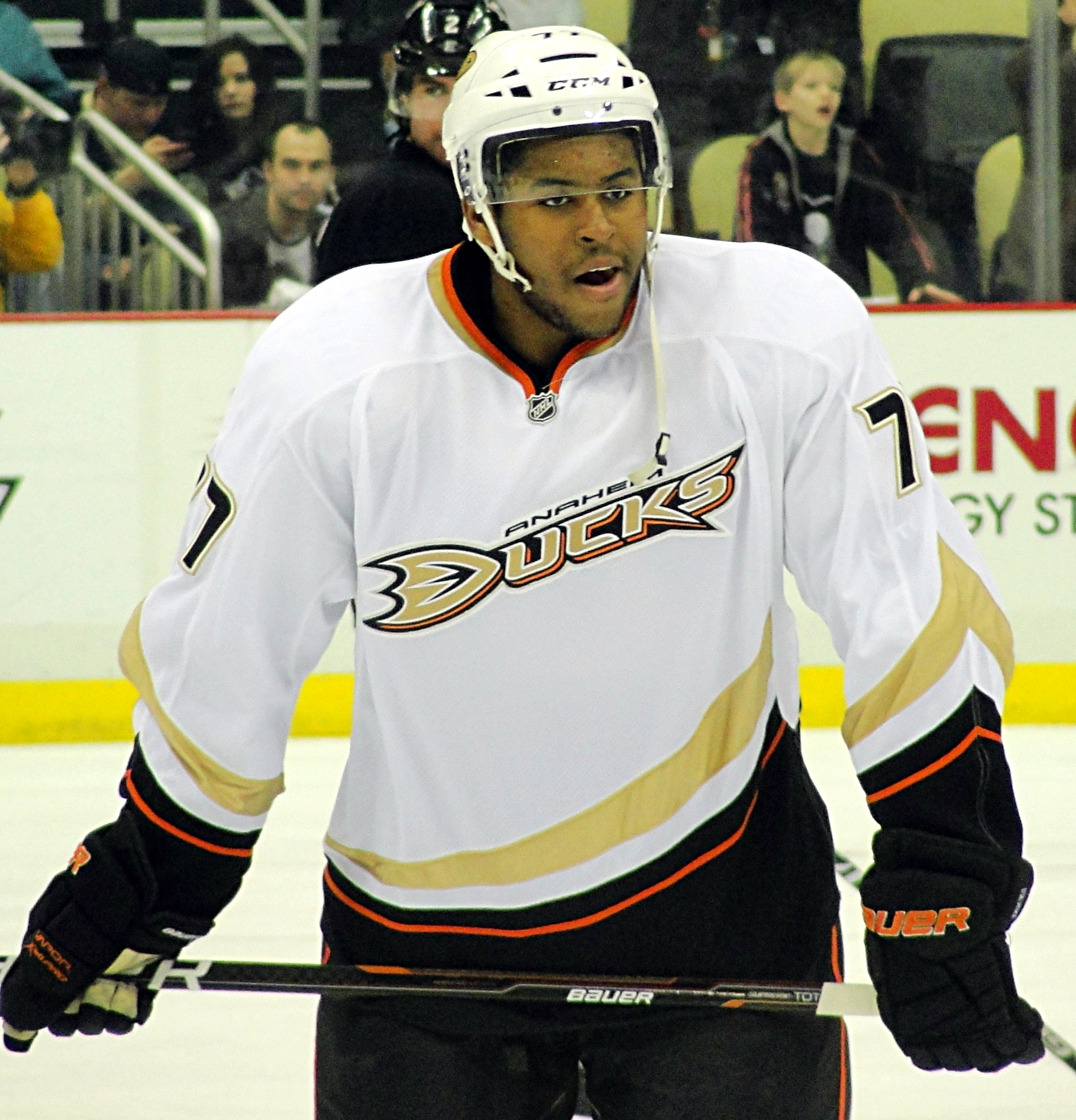
Smith-Pelly in February 2012. The 2011–12 season was his rookie season in the NHL

Returning to the OHL for a third season following his draft, Smith-Pelly recorded a junior career-high 36 goals and 66 points over 67 games. He added 21 points in 20 OHL playoff games, as the Majors lost in the Final to the Owen Sound Attack. Despite losing the OHL title, the Majors qualified for the 2011 Memorial Cup, Canada's national major junior tournament, by way of having been chosen as the host team at the beginning of the season. Advancing to the final, the Majors were defeated by the Saint John Sea Dogs In the Memorial Cup Final, 3–1. Smith-Pelly recorded six points over five games and was named to the Tournament All-Star Team.

=== Professional ===
Although eligible for one more OHL season in 2011–12, Smith-Pelly made the Anaheim Ducks' roster out of training camp. He recorded five points in his first 26 games before the Ducks agreed to loan him to the Canadian national junior team in December 2011.

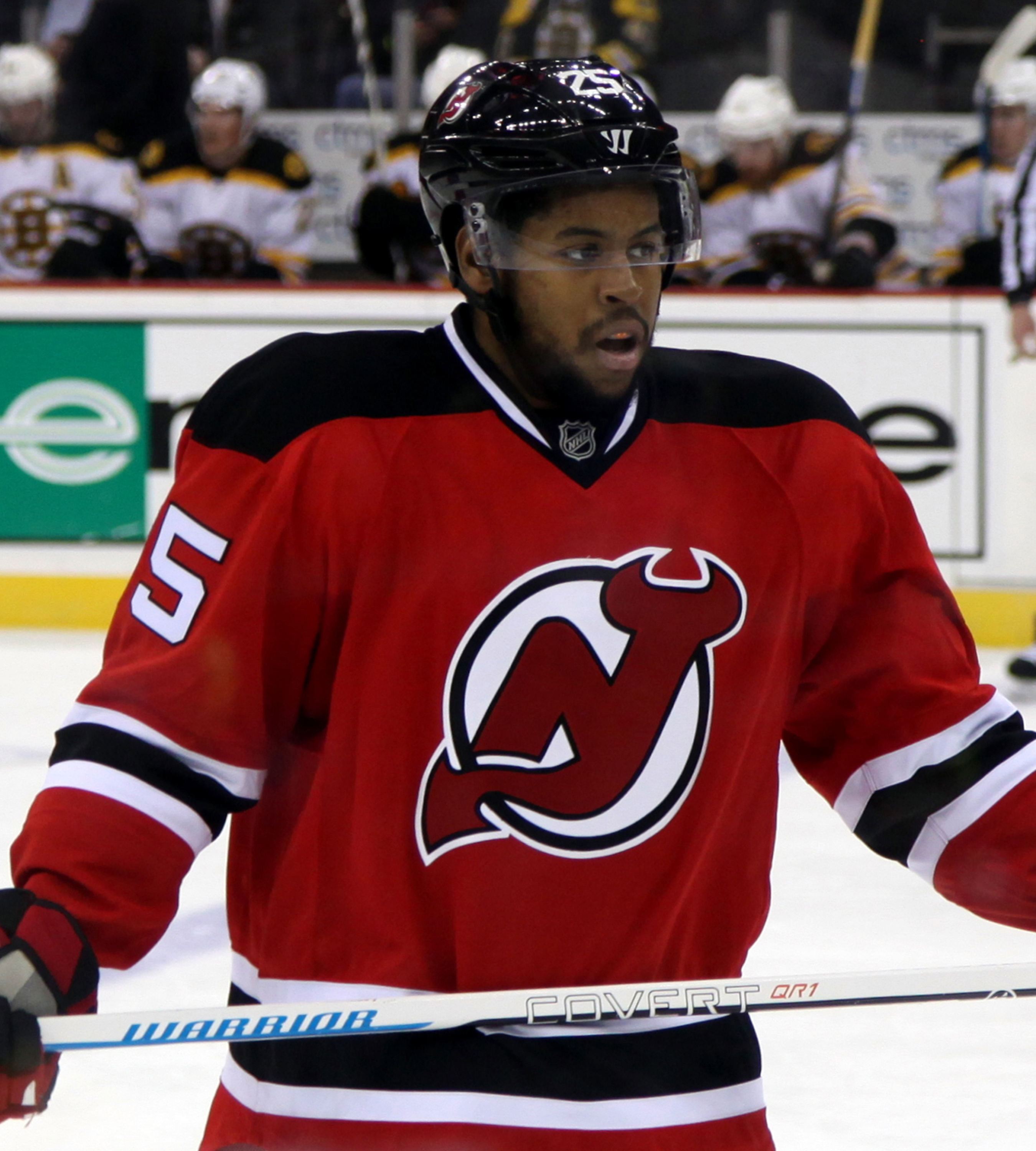
Smith-Pelly with the Devils in March 2016

During his first full season in the NHL with the Ducks in 2014–15, having produced 17 points in 54 games, on February 24, 2015, he was traded to the Montreal Canadiens in exchange for Jiří Sekáč.

In the following 2015–16 season, Smith-Pelly got off to a strong start with the Canadiens as they had a franchise-best 9 straight wins to start the year. However, with only 6 goals through 46 games, he was dealt by the Canadiens to the New Jersey Devils, just a little over a year from when he was acquired on February 29, 2016, in exchange for Stefan Matteau. During the offseason, on July 1, 2016, Smith-Pelly signed a two-year, $2.6 million contract extension with the Devils.

After Smith-Pelly regressed in the 2016–17 season, he was placed on waivers by the Devils in order to buy out the remaining year and $1.3 million left on his contract on June 30, 2017.

On July 3, 2017, he was signed to a one-year, two-way contract with the Washington Capitals with a $650,000 salary. On February 17, 2018, Smith-Pelly was the target of a racist chant by four fans at the United Center during a game against the Chicago Blackhawks. The four fans, who were chanting the word "basketball" repeatedly, were escorted out of the United Center and issued a lifetime ban from the arena by the Blackhawks organization. Both the NHL and Blackhawks condemned the action of the four fans and apologized to Smith-Pelly. Smith-Pelly scored seven goals in the 2018 playoffs, including the tying goal in the clinching game five of the Stanley Cup Final on Vegas Golden Knights goaltender Marc-André Fleury to eventually help the Capitals secure their first NHL title in team history. Smith-Pelly became the second player in NHL history, behind Patrice Bergeron-Cleary to have a hyphenated surname engraved on the Stanley Cup.

During the 2018–19 season, Smith-Pelly continued with the Capitals in a fourth-line role. Through inconsistent play and contributing with 8 points in 54 games, on February 20, 2019, Smith-Pelly was placed on waivers by the Washington Capitals before successfully clearing the following day. He was then assigned to affiliate, the Hershey Bears, returning to the AHL for the first time since 2014. Smith-Pelly returned to the Washington Capitals during the first-round series in the 2019 playoffs after T. J. Oshie was injured in game four versus the Carolina Hurricanes.

Leaving the Capitals as a free agent, Smith-Pelly, with limited NHL interest, opted to sign abroad for the first time in his career, agreeing to a one-year contract with Chinese-based club, HC Kunlun Red Star of the Kontinental Hockey League on October 25, 2019. In the 2019–20 season, Smith-Pelly in a checking-line role added 8 goals, 3 assists and 11 points through 36 regular season games.

In the pandemic-delayed 2020–21 season, Smith-Pelly belatedly returned to the North American professional circuit after accepting a professional tryout contract with the Ontario Reign of the AHL, primary affiliate to the Los Angeles Kings on March 13, 2021. While playing with the Reign, Smith-Pelly played on a line with Quinton Byfield and Akil Thomas, forming the first all-Black line in the history of the team.

On December 30, 2022, Smith-Pelly announced his retirement from professional hockey.

== International play ==
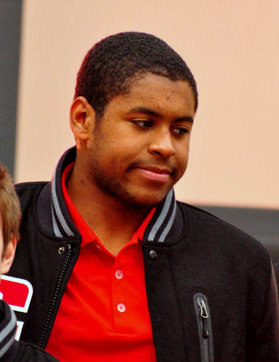
- Smith-Pelly as a member of Team Canada at the 2012 World Junior Championships

Medal record

Representing Canada

Ice hockey

World Junior Championships
Bronze medal – third place	2012 Canada	

World U-17 Hockey Challenge
Gold medal – first place	2009 Canada	

Smith-Pelly debuted with Hockey Canada at the 2009 World U-17 Hockey Challenge. He recorded three assists over six games playing with Team Ontario, helping them to a gold medal win.

During his NHL rookie season, the Anaheim Ducks loaned Smith-Pelly to the Canadian junior team for the 2012 World Junior Championships. One of two players to be loaned from the NHL (Tampa Bay Lightning forward Brett Connolly was the other), he was named an alternate captain for the team. In Canada's first game of the tournament, against Finland, he broke a bone in his left foot blocking a shot. Opting to stay with the team rather than return to Anaheim to begin his rehabilitation, Smith-Pelly watched as Canada went on to win the bronze medal and since he was part of the Canadian roster, he also received a medal.

== Personal life ==
After winning the Stanley Cup with the Capitals in 2018, Smith-Pelly, along with two of his teammates, declined to visit the White House, an NHL tradition, because of Donald Trump's political rhetoric.

== Career statistics ==
=== Regular season and playoffs ===
			Regular season					Playoffs
Season	Team	League	GP	G	A	Pts	PIM	GP	G	A	Pts	PIM
2008–09	Mississauga St. Michael's Majors	OHL	57	13	12	25	24	11	2	3	5	4
2009–10	Mississauga St. Michael's Majors	OHL	60	29	33	62	35	16	8	6	14	20
2010–11	Mississauga St. Michael's Majors	OHL	67	36	30	66	50	20	15	6	21	16
2011–12	Anaheim Ducks	NHL	49	7	6	13	16	—	—	—	—	—
2011–12	Syracuse Crunch	AHL	4	0	1	1	2	—	—	—	—	—
2012–13	Norfolk Admirals	AHL	65	14	18	32	65	—	—	—	—	—
2012–13	Anaheim Ducks	NHL	7	0	0	0	0	—	—	—	—	—
2013–14	Norfolk Admirals	AHL	55	27	16	43	29	—	—	—	—	—
2013–14	Anaheim Ducks	NHL	19	2	8	10	2	12	5	0	5	24
2014–15	Anaheim Ducks	NHL	54	5	12	17	12	—	—	—	—	—
2014–15	Montreal Canadiens	NHL	20	1	2	3	14	12	1	2	3	2
2015–16	Montreal Canadiens	NHL	46	6	6	12	22	—	—	—	—	—
2015–16	New Jersey Devils	NHL	18	8	5	13	8	—	—	—	—	—
2016–17	New Jersey Devils	NHL	53	4	5	9	12	—	—	—	—	—
2017–18	Washington Capitals	NHL	75	7	9	16	38	24	7	1	8	12
2018–19	Washington Capitals	NHL	54	4	4	8	15	3	0	0	0	0
2018–19	Hershey Bears	AHL	20	6	8	14	2	—	—	—	—	—
2019–20	Kunlun Red Star	KHL	36	8	3	11	40	—	—	—	—	—
2020–21	Ontario Reign	AHL	14	0	1	1	4	—	—	—	—	—
2021–22	Laval Rocket	AHL	24	4	4	8	6	7	0	0	0	4
NHL totals			395	44	57	101	137	51	13	3	16	38

=== International ===
Year	Team	Event	Result	GP	G	A	Pts	PIM
2009	Canada Ontario	U17	1st place, gold medalist(s)	6	0	3	3	4
2012	Canada	WJC	3rd place, bronze medalist(s)	1	0	0	0	0
Junior totals				7	0	3	3	4

== Awards and honours ==
Award	Year
OHL
All-Star Game	2010
CHL Top Prospects Game	2010
CHL Memorial Cup All-Star Team	2011
NHL
Stanley Cup champion	2018
