= Travis Boyd =

American ice hockey player (born 1993)

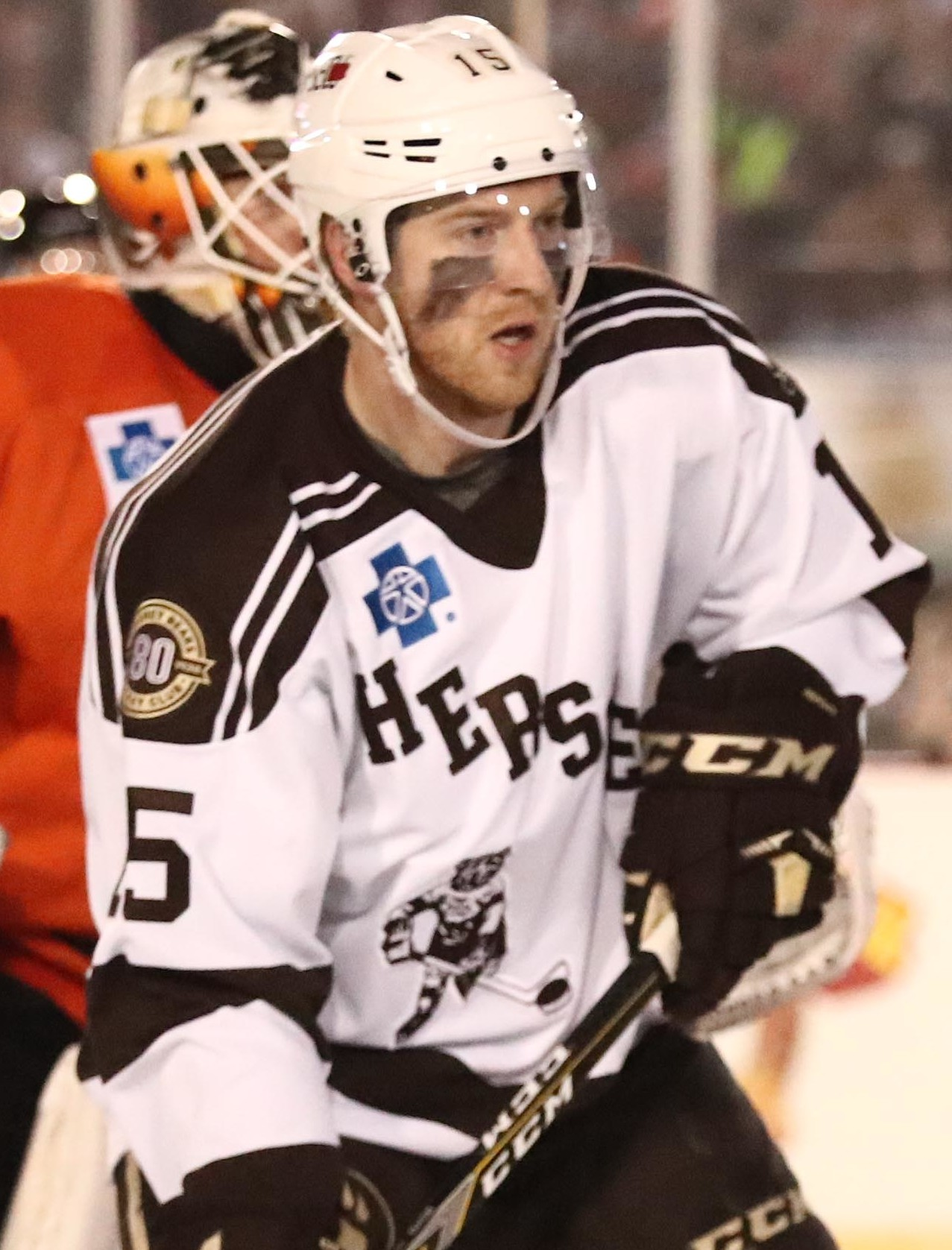
- Boyd with the Hershey Bears in 2018
- Born: September 14, 1993 (age 33) Hopkins, Minnesota, U.S.
- Height: 5 ft 11 in (180 cm)
- Weight: 184 lb (83 kg; 13 st 2 lb)
- Position: Forward
- Shoots: Right
- NHL team Former teams: Free agent Washington Capitals; Vancouver Canucks; Arizona Coyotes; Minnesota Wild
- NHL draft: 177th overall, 2011; Washington Capitals
- Playing career: 2015–present

Travis Boyd (born September 14, 1993) is an American professional ice hockey forward who is currently an unrestricted free agent. He most recently played for the Toronto Marlies in the American Hockey League (AHL) while under contract to the Toronto Maple Leafs of the National Hockey League (NHL). Boyd was selected in the 6th round, 177th overall, by the Washington Capitals in the 2011 NHL entry draft.

== Playing career ==
Boyd played four collegiate seasons of NCAA Division I hockey with the Minnesota Golden Gophers in the Big Ten Conference. With the Gophers, Boyd won a Big Ten Championship in the 2014–15 season, and was named to the Big Ten second All-Star team for that same season. At the age of 17, he became the youngest player drafted in the 2011 NHL entry draft when he was selected 177th overall by the Washington Capitals.

On March 31, 2015, the Washington Capitals signed Boyd to a two-year, entry-level contract, beginning in the 2015–16 season. Boyd signed a tryout agreement for the Capitals' American Hockey League (AHL) affiliate, the Hershey Bears, for the remainder of the 2014–15 season. He played two games for the Bears, registering a goal and an assist. Boyd re-signed with the Capitals on July 5, 2017. He made his NHL debut on December 4, 2017, due to injuries to the Capitals regular line up. He recorded his first career NHL point against the Philadelphia Flyers on March 18, 2018. He won the Stanley Cup with the Capitals on June 7, 2018. He finished the season with 8 games, registering the one point and played in one playoff game.

On July 1, the Capitals re-signed Boyd to a two-year contract with an average annual value of $800,000. Despite suffering an injury in the preseason, Boyd began the 2018–19 season in the NHL. Boyd scored his first NHL goal on December 9 in a 4–0 win over the Columbus Blue Jackets on a pass from team captain Alex Ovechkin. He played in 24 games recording 10 points during the regular season. However, his poor play during the playoffs saw him scratched after game 2 versus the New York Islanders. At the end of the season, the Capitals did not extend a qualifying offer to Boyd and he became an unrestricted free agent.

As a free agent, Boyd signed a one-year, $700,000 contract with the Toronto Maple Leafs on October 10, 2020. During the pandemic-shorted 2020–21 season Boyd scored 3 goals and registered 8 points in 20 games with the Maple Leafs. The Maple Leafs attempted to transfer Boyd to the taxi squad near the trade deadline, forcing them to put him on waivers. On March 22, 2021, Boyd was claimed off waivers by the Vancouver Canucks. He played in 19 games with the Canucks scoring 2 goals.

On August 3, 2021, Boyd signed as a free agent to a one-year, $750,000 contract with the Arizona Coyotes. Boyd was considered a depth forward on his previous teams and was not considered a top forward upon joining the Coyotes. However, on the Coyotes he played on the top power play unit. During the pandemic-shortened 2021–22 season, Boyd scored 10 goals and 34 points in 46 games. On March 5, 2022, Boyd signed a two-year, $3.5 million contract to stay with the Coyotes.

After three seasons with the Coyotes, Boyd left as a free agent following the transfer of their personnel to the Utah Hockey Club. He was signed to a one-year, two-way contract with the Minnesota Wild on July 1, 2024. In the 2024–25 season, Boyd was primarily assigned to the AHL, making 62 appearances and registering 53 points with the Iowa Wild. He was scoreless in 3 games through recall with Minnesota.

As a free agent, Boyd left the Wild after a lone season and was signed to a one-year, $775,000, contract with the Toronto Maple Leafs on July 1, 2025.

== Personal life ==
Boyd and his wife Kelsey have one daughter together.

== Career statistics ==
=== Regular season and playoffs ===
			Regular season					Playoffs
Season	Team	League	GP	G	A	Pts	PIM	GP	G	A	Pts	PIM
2008–09	Hopkins High School	HSMN	26	26	25	51	22	—	—	—	—	—
2009–10	U.S. NTDP Juniors	USHL	35	8	10	18	18	—	—	—	—	—
2009–10	U.S. NTDP U17	USDP	52	10	14	24	22	—	—	—	—	—
2009–10	U.S. NTDP U18	USDP	1	0	0	0	0	—	—	—	—	—
2010–11	U.S. NTDP Juniors	USHL	24	5	13	18	10	—	—	—	—	—
2010–11	U.S. NTDP U18	USDP	60	13	25	38	16	—	—	—	—	—
2011–12	University of Minnesota	WCHA	35	1	8	9	4	—	—	—	—	—
2012–13	University of Minnesota	WCHA	40	3	11	14	8	—	—	—	—	—
2013–14	University of Minnesota	B1G	41	9	23	32	18	—	—	—	—	—
2014–15	University of Minnesota	B1G	32	19	22	41	10	—	—	—	—	—
2014–15	Hershey Bears	AHL	2	1	1	2	0	—	—	—	—	—
2015–16	Hershey Bears	AHL	76	21	32	53	24	21	2	7	9	4
2016–17	Hershey Bears	AHL	76	16	47	63	16	12	1	7	8	2
2017–18	Hershey Bears	AHL	61	15	32	47	12	—	—	—	—	—
2017–18	Washington Capitals	NHL	8	0	1	1	2	1	0	0	0	0
2018–19	Hershey Bears	AHL	2	0	1	1	2	—	—	—	—	—
2018–19	Washington Capitals	NHL	53	5	15	20	6	1	0	0	0	0
2019–20	Washington Capitals	NHL	24	3	7	10	2	4	1	0	1	0
2019–20	Hershey Bears	AHL	4	4	2	6	2	—	—	—	—	—
2020–21	Toronto Maple Leafs	NHL	20	3	5	8	2	—	—	—	—	—
2020–21	Vancouver Canucks	NHL	19	2	0	2	0	—	—	—	—	—
2021–22	Arizona Coyotes	NHL	74	17	18	35	34	—	—	—	—	—
2022–23	Arizona Coyotes	NHL	82	15	19	34	26	—	—	—	—	—
2023–24	Arizona Coyotes	NHL	16	2	6	8	2	—	—	—	—	—
2024–25	Iowa Wild	AHL	63	22	31	53	20	—	—	—	—	—
2024–25	Minnesota Wild	NHL	3	0	0	0	0	—	—	—	—	—
2025–26	Toronto Marlies	AHL	34	10	19	29	6	—	—	—	—	—
NHL totals			299	47	71	118	74	6	1	0	1	0

=== International ===
Year	Team	Event	Result	GP	G	A	Pts	PIM
2010	United States	U17	1st place, gold medalist(s)	6	1	2	3	0
2011	United States	WJC18	1st place, gold medalist(s)	6	2	4	6	2
Junior totals				12	3	6	9	2

== Awards and honours ==
Award	Year
College
WCHA All-Academic Team	2013
B1G Second All-Star Team	2015
AHL
Second All-Star Team	2017
Calder Cup champion	2026
NHL
Stanley Cup champion	2018
