= Jakub Vrána =

Czech ice hockey player (born 1996)

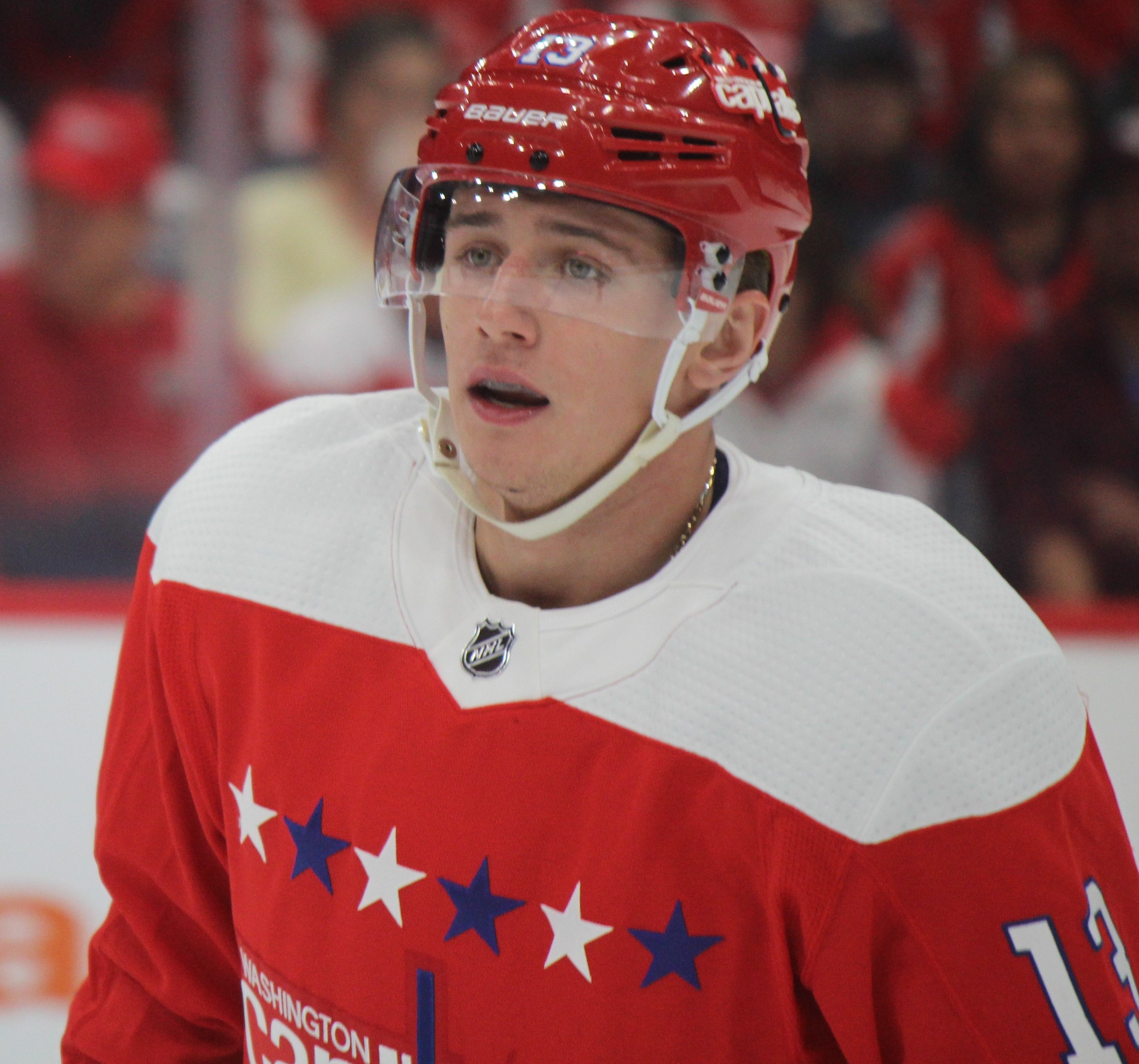
- Vrána with the Washington Capitals in 2019
- Born: 28 February 1996 (age 30) Prague, Czech Republic
- Height: 6 ft 0 in (183 cm)
- Weight: 197 lb (89 kg; 14 st 1 lb)
- Position: Winger
- Shoots: Left
- SHL team Former teams: Linköping HC; Washington Capitals; Detroit Red Wings; St. Louis Blues; Nashville Predators
- National team: Czech Republic
- NHL draft: 13th overall, 2014; Washington Capitals
- Playing career: 2013–present

Jakub Vrána (born 28 February 1996) is a Czech professional ice hockey player who is a winger for Linköping HC of the Swedish Hockey League (SHL). Vrána was selected by the Washington Capitals in the first round, 13th overall, of the 2014 NHL entry draft, and has also played in the NHL for the Detroit Red Wings, St. Louis Blues and Nashville Predators. Vrána won the Stanley Cup as a member of the Capitals in 2018.

== Early life ==
Vrána was born on 28 February 1996, in Prague to parents Jana and Karel. He began skating at a rink owned by the brother of former Capitals scout Vojtech Kucera before moving away from home at 15 to play in the Swedish Hockey League (SHL). Vrána played in the 2009 Quebec International Pee-Wee Hockey Tournament with his minor ice hockey team from Chomutov.

== Playing career ==
=== SHL ===
Vrána made his Elitserien debut playing with Linköping HC during the 2012–13 season. Upon making his Elitserien debut in October 2012, Vrána became the youngest foreign player in the history of the league and the ninth-youngest overall. He subsequently spent the following season splitting his time between Linkoping's junior and senior team. Vrána registered three points and two penalty minutes in 24 games with the senior team and collected 25 points in 24 games with the junior club. At the conclusion of the 2013–14 season, Vrána was ranked fourth overall among European skaters by the NHL Central Scouting Bureau.

=== Washington Capitals ===
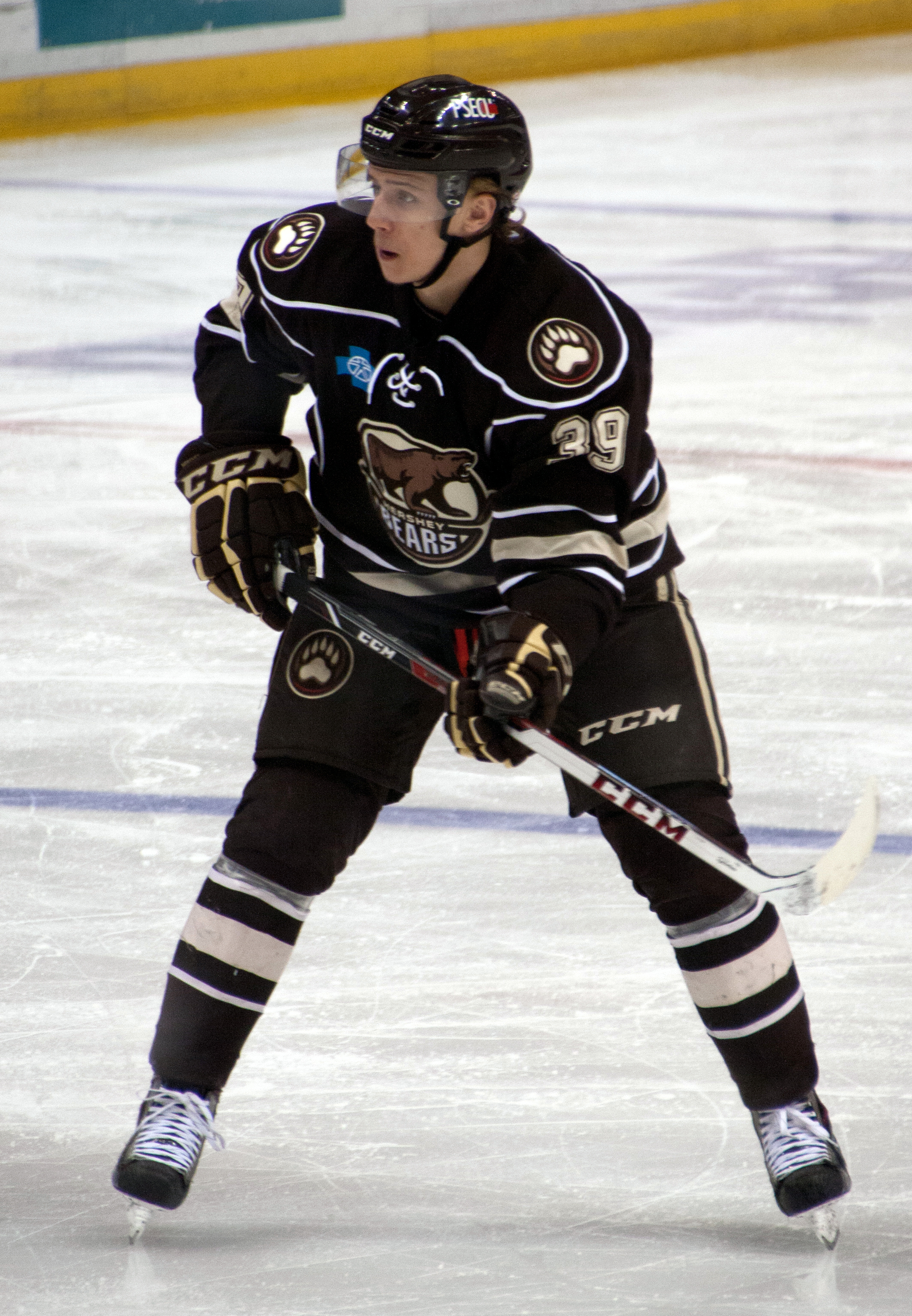
Vrána with the Hershey Bears in 2015

Vrána was eventually drafted in the first round, 13th overall, by the Washington Capitals in the 2014 NHL entry draft. After the 2014 draft, Vrána attended the Capitals development camp and signed a three-year, entry-level contract. Vrána was subsequently returned to Sweden for the entirety of the 2014–15 season before joining the Capitals American Hockey League (AHL) affiliate, the Hershey Bears, for three regular season games. Vrána then began his first full professional season in North America with the Bears during their 2015–16 season. He tallied two goals and four assists through six games with the Bears before suffering a wrist injury. He missed about three months of the regular season after undergoing wrist surgery but still finished the regular season with 16 goals with 18 assists through 36 games. Vrána continued to score for the Bears during their post-season run and tallied eight goals and six assists through 21 games.

During the 2016 off-season, Vrána worked on gaining weight and returned to the Capitals development camp 10 pounds heavier. In his second season in North America, Vrána once again began with the Hershey Bears but received his first NHL call-up on 29 November 2016. At the time of the recall, he registered 16 points through 18 games and was tied for third in the league in goals. He subsequently made his NHL debut on 1 December against the New York Islanders and skated on the Capitals second line with Evgeny Kuznetsov and André Burakovsky. A few games later, on 9 December, Vrána scored his first NHL goal in a 4–1 win over the Buffalo Sabres. Vrána also tallied his first multi-point game with two assists on 13 December against the Islanders. After recording three points through 12 games, he was reassigned to the Bears on 1 January 2017. Vrána was recalled again the following month but was reassigned without playing a single game. However, following injuries to the Capitals lineup, Vrána and Zach Sanford were recalled to the NHL level on 17 February.

Vrána made the Capitals opening night roster for the 2017–18 season. His rookie season was considered a "roller-coaster", ending up 13 goals scored and 14 assists in 73 games. He made his Stanley Cup playoffs debut during the 2018 playoffs, providing the "speedy, offensive complement to the shutdown duo" of Nicklas Bäckström and T. J. Oshie on Washington's second line. Vrána scored his first Stanley Cup playoffs goal on 29 April 2018 against the Pittsburgh Penguins. The Capitals would go on to defeat the Penguins in six games and then win the Eastern Conference by defeating the Tampa Bay Lightning in seven games. He scored the opening goal in game five of the 2018 Stanley Cup Final against the Vegas Golden Knights which resulted in the Capitals' victory. Vrána ended the playoffs with eight points in 23 games to help the Capitals win their first Stanley Cup.

During the 2018–19 season, Vrána set career highs in goals, assists, and points, while also ranking third on the team in goals. He also became the 15th player in franchise history to record at least 24 goals in a single season before the age of 24. As a result of his success, the Capitals re-signed Vrána to a new two-year, $6.7 million contract on 16 July 2019.

=== Detroit Red Wings ===
On 12 April 2021, Vrána was traded to the Detroit Red Wings, along with Richard Pánik, a first-round pick in 2021 and a second-round pick in 2022, in exchange for Anthony Mantha. Upon joining the team, Vrána tallied 11 points through 11 games and tied numerous franchise records. During a game against the Dallas Stars on 22 April, Vrána became the 26th player in Red Wings history to score four-or-more goals in a game and the second player in franchise history to record a hat trick within his first four games of joining the team.

On 10 August 2021, Vrána signed a three-year, $16.25 million contract with the Red Wings. Following the signing, Vrána was injured during the first 10 minutes of Red Wings practice and was expected to miss three to four months. Vrána only played 26 games in the 2021–22 season due to his injury, but contributed 13 goals and six assists in his shortened season. On 19 October 2022, Vrána was placed in the NHL's "Player Assistance Program."

In January 2023, the Red Wings placed Vrána on waivers for the purpose of assigning him to the team's AHL affiliate, the Grand Rapids Griffins. Vrana cleared waivers without being claimed by another team.

=== St. Louis Blues ===
On 3 March 2023, the Red Wings traded Vrána to the St. Louis Blues in exchange for prospect Dylan McLaughlin and a seventh-round pick in the 2025 NHL entry draft. Vrána seemed to rediscover his scoring touch with the Blues, scoring 10 goals in 20 games.

Vrána hoped to continue his recent wave of success with the Blues in the 2023–24 season, and he was named to the Blues' opening night roster after a successful preseason. Unfortunately, this success would not continue, as Vrána would miss practices for undisclosed reasons, as well as be healthy scratched throughout the season. On 11 December 2023, it was announced that the Blues placed Vrána on waivers. However this was later retracted, and instead the Blues would make it clear that Vrána would be available for trade. Vrána would continue being a healthy scratch afterwards, and would play two more games for the Blues before being loaned to their AHL affiliate, the Springfield Thunderbirds. On 27 February 2024, the AHL suspended Vrána two games for cross-checking Bridgeport Islanders forward Cole Bardreau. Vrána played out the remainder of his contract with the Blues in the AHL, finishing with 36 points through 42 regular season games.

=== Return to Washington ===
As a free agent from the Blues, Vrána was unable to earn a contract offer over the summer. On 15 August 2024, Vrána agreed to an invitation to return to his original club, the Washington Capitals, on a professional tryout agreement (PTO) for their 2024–25 training camp. He subsequently made the opening night roster and signed a one-year contract with the Capitals.

=== Nashville Predators ===
On 5 March 2025, Vrána was waived by the Capitals, and was subsequently claimed by the Nashville Predators the following day. He played out the remainder of the season with the Predators, posting 2 goals and 3 points through 13 appearances as Nashville failed to qualify for the post-season.

=== Return to Linköping HC ===
As a free agent from the Predators, Vrána opted to leave North America after 11 professional seasons and return to his original professional club in Sweden in signing a two-year contract with Linköping HC of the SHL on 8 August 2025.

== Career statistics ==
=== Regular season and playoffs ===
			Regular season					Playoffs
Season	Team	League	GP	G	A	Pts	PIM	GP	G	A	Pts	PIM
2010–11	HC Letci Letňany	CZE U16	18	28	15	43	30	—	—	—	—	—
2010–11	HC Letci Letňany	CZE U18	26	19	10	29	10	—	—	—	—	—
2011–12	Linköpings HC	J18	21	16	6	22	2	—	—	—	—	—
2011–12	Linköpings HC	J18 Allsv	11	12	11	23	4	3	2	2	4	12
2011–12	Linköpings HC	J20	3	1	0	1	2	—	—	—	—	—
2012–13	Linköpings HC	J18 Allsv	3	3	2	5	2	2	1	0	1	12
2012–13	Linköpings HC	J20	32	20	12	32	49	5	1	0	1	0
2012–13	Linköpings HC	SEL	5	0	0	0	0	—	—	—	—	—
2013–14	Linköpings HC	J18 Allsv	1	0	0	0	0	3	1	2	3	4
2013–14	Linköpings HC	J20	24	14	11	25	26	—	—	—	—	—
2013–14	Linköpings HC	SHL	24	2	1	3	2	14	1	1	2	6
2014–15	Linköpings HC	SHL	44	12	12	24	12	11	4	1	5	2
2014–15	Hershey Bears	AHL	3	0	5	5	0	10	2	4	6	2
2015–16	Hershey Bears	AHL	36	16	18	34	20	21	8	6	14	2
2016–17	Hershey Bears	AHL	49	19	17	36	28	7	0	0	0	4
2016–17	Washington Capitals	NHL	21	3	3	6	2	—	—	—	—	—
2017–18	Washington Capitals	NHL	73	13	14	27	12	23	3	5	8	2
2018–19	Washington Capitals	NHL	82	24	23	47	27	7	0	0	0	6
2019–20	Washington Capitals	NHL	69	25	27	52	18	8	0	0	0	2
2020–21	Washington Capitals	NHL	39	11	14	25	8	—	—	—	—	—
2020–21	Detroit Red Wings	NHL	23	13	5	18	2	—	—	—	—	—
2021–22	Detroit Red Wings	NHL	26	13	6	19	16	—	—	—	—	—
2022–23	Detroit Red Wings	NHL	5	1	1	2	0	—	—	—	—	—
2022–23	Grand Rapids Griffins	AHL	17	6	5	11	4	—	—	—	—	—
2022–23	St. Louis Blues	NHL	20	10	4	14	10	—	—	—	—	—
2023–24	St. Louis Blues	NHL	21	2	4	6	8	—	—	—	—	—
2023–24	Springfield Thunderbirds	AHL	42	16	20	36	54	—	—	—	—	—
2024–25	Washington Capitals	NHL	26	7	4	11	6	—	—	—	—	—
2024–25	Nashville Predators	NHL	13	2	1	3	4	—	—	—	—	—
SHL totals			73	14	13	27	14	25	5	2	7	8
NHL totals			406	119	104	223	113	38	3	5	8	10

Medal record

Representing Czech Republic

Ice hockey

World Championships
Bronze medal – third place	2022 Finland	

=== International ===
Year	Team	Event	Result	GP	G	A	Pts	PIM
2012	Czech Republic	U17	8th	5	2	0	2	4
2012	Czech Republic	WJC18	8th	6	4	4	8	4
2013	Czech Republic	WJC	5th	6	0	1	1	2
2013	Czech Republic	WJC18	7th	5	2	0	2	2
2013	Czech Republic	IH18	3rd place, bronze medalist(s)	4	3	1	4	4
2014	Czech Republic	WJC	6th	5	1	1	2	2
2014	Czech Republic	WJC18	2nd place, silver medalist(s)	7	8	2	10	4
2015	Czech Republic	WJC	6th	5	2	1	3	2
2019	Czech Republic	WC	4th	9	4	1	5	0
2021	Czech Republic	WC	7th	7	2	2	4	4
2022	Czech Republic	WC	3rd place, bronze medalist(s)	10	1	0	1	4
Junior totals				43	22	10	32	24
Senior totals				26	7	3	10	8

== Awards and honors ==
Award	Year
NHL
Stanley Cup champion	2018

Awards and achievements
Preceded by André Burakovsky	Washington Capitals first-round draft pick 2014	Succeeded by Ilya Samsonov
