= 2019 NHL Winter Classic =

Outdoor National Hockey League game in South Bend, Indiana

	1	2	3	Total
Boston Bruins	1	1	2	4
Chicago Blackhawks	1	1	0	2
- Date: January 1, 2019
- Venue: Notre Dame Stadium
- City: Notre Dame
- Attendance: 76,126

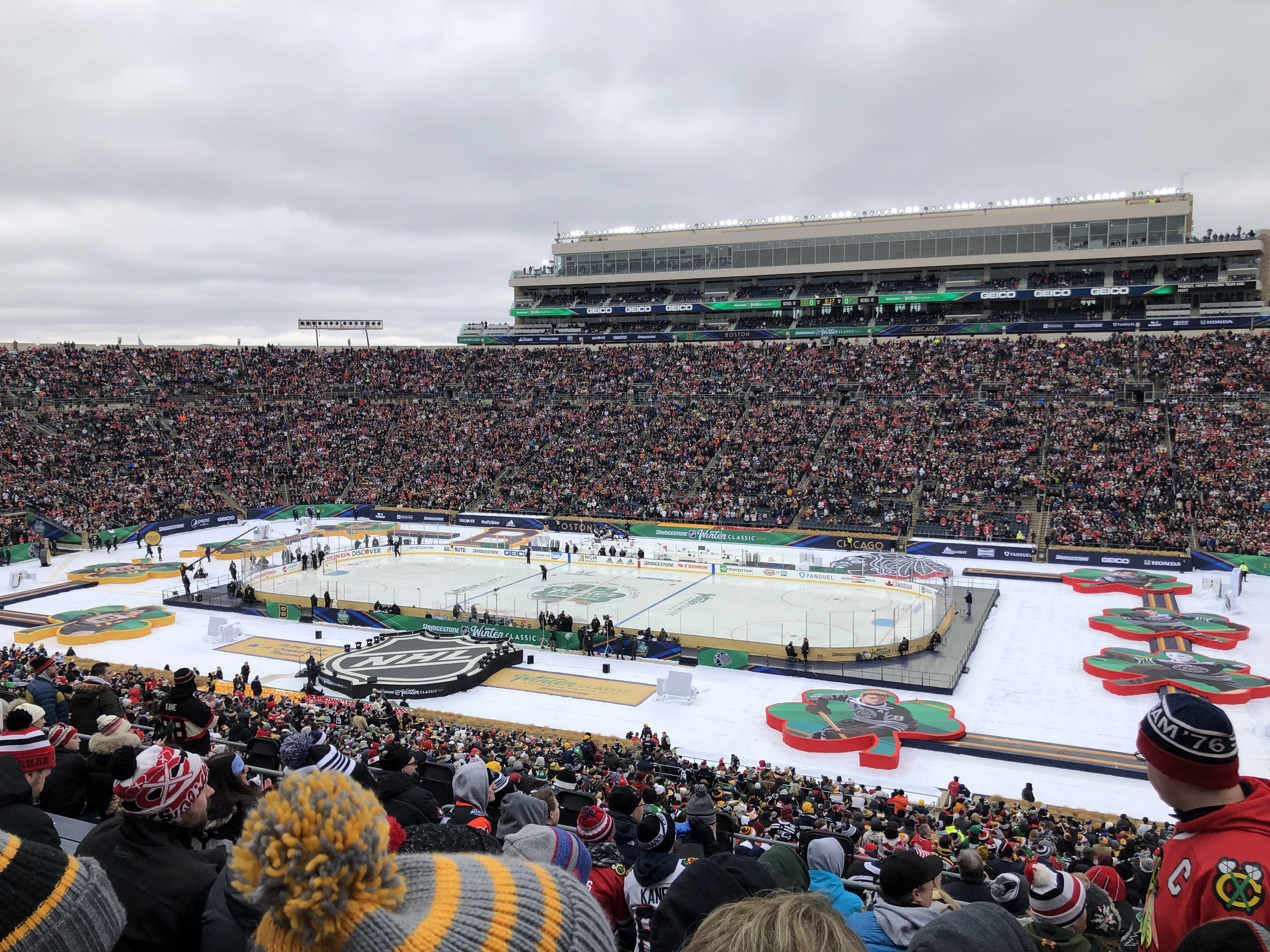
The 2019 Winter Classic

The 2019 NHL Winter Classic (officially the 2019 Bridgestone NHL Winter Classic) was an outdoor ice hockey game played in the National Hockey League (NHL) on January 1, 2019, at Notre Dame Stadium in Notre Dame, Indiana. The 11th edition of the Winter Classic, the game matched the Chicago Blackhawks against the Boston Bruins; the Bruins won, 4–2. It was the fourth Winter Classic appearance for the Blackhawks (2009, 2015, 2017), their sixth outdoor game overall, and fifth outdoor game in six years. It was the third Winter Classic appearance for the Bruins (2010, 2016). The game was the Bruins' first Winter Classic as the visiting team, and the first time the NHL hosted an outdoor game outside a team's immediate media market (Chicago, the host team, is in an adjacent media market to the South Bend market where Notre Dame is located).

== Game summary ==
January 1, 2019	Boston Bruins	4–2	Chicago Blackhawks	Notre Dame Stadium	Recap

The Boston Bruins won 4–2 with Tuukka Rask in goal, making 36 saves. The game was Rask's 469th for the Bruins, making him the most prolific goaltender in Bruins history. David Pastrnak, Patrice Bergeron, Sean Kuraly and Brad Marchand scored the goals for the Bruins. Brendan Perlini and Dominik Kahun scored the goals for the Blackhawks.

Scoring summary
Period	Team	Goal	Assist(s)	Time	Score
1st	CHI	Brendan Perlini (5)	David Kampf (10) and Dylan Sikura (3)	08:30	CHI 1–0
1st	BOS	David Pastrnak (24) – pp	Patrice Bergeron (20)	12:38	1–1
2nd	CHI	Dominik Kahun (5)	Erik Gustafsson (12) and Jonathan Toews (20)	11:24	CHI 2–1
2nd	BOS	Patrice Bergeron (13) – pp	David Pastrnak (26) and Torey Krug (20)	18:48	2–2
3rd	BOS	Sean Kuraly (4)	Chris Wagner (3) and Matt Grzelcyk (10)	10:20	BOS 3–2
3rd	BOS	Brad Marchand (13) – en	David Krejci (24)	19:27	BOS 4–2

Number in parentheses represents the player's total in goals or assists to that point of the season

Penalty summary
Period	Team	Player	Penalty	Time	PIM
1st	BOS	Brandon Carlo	Holding	05:52	2:00
1st	CHI	Artem Anisimov	Tripping	12:05	2:00
1st	BOS	Matt Grzelcyk	High-sticking	17:03	2:00
2nd	BOS	Sean Kuraly	Hooking	02:23	2:00
2nd	CHI	Erik Gustafsson	Roughing	17:57	2:00
2nd	BOS	Matt Grzelcyk	Hooking	19:50	2:00
3rd	CHI	Patrick Kane	High-sticking	01:03	2:00
3rd	CHI	Artem Anisimov	Tripping	01:42	2:00
3rd	CHI	Gustav Forsling	Hooking	04:56	2:00

Shots by period
Team	1	2	3	Total
Boston	14	10	12	36
Chicago	12	16	10	38

Power play opportunities
Team	Goals/Opportunities
Boston	2/5
Chicago	0/4

Three star selections
	Team	Player	Statistics
1st	BOS	David Pastrnak	1 goal, 1 assist
2nd	CHI	Cam Ward	32 saves
3rd	BOS	Patrice Bergeron	1 goal, 1 assist

== Officials ==
Referees: Eric Furlatt, Francis Charron

Linesmen: Matt MacPherson, Bryan Pancich

== Pregame/Anthem/Entertainment ==
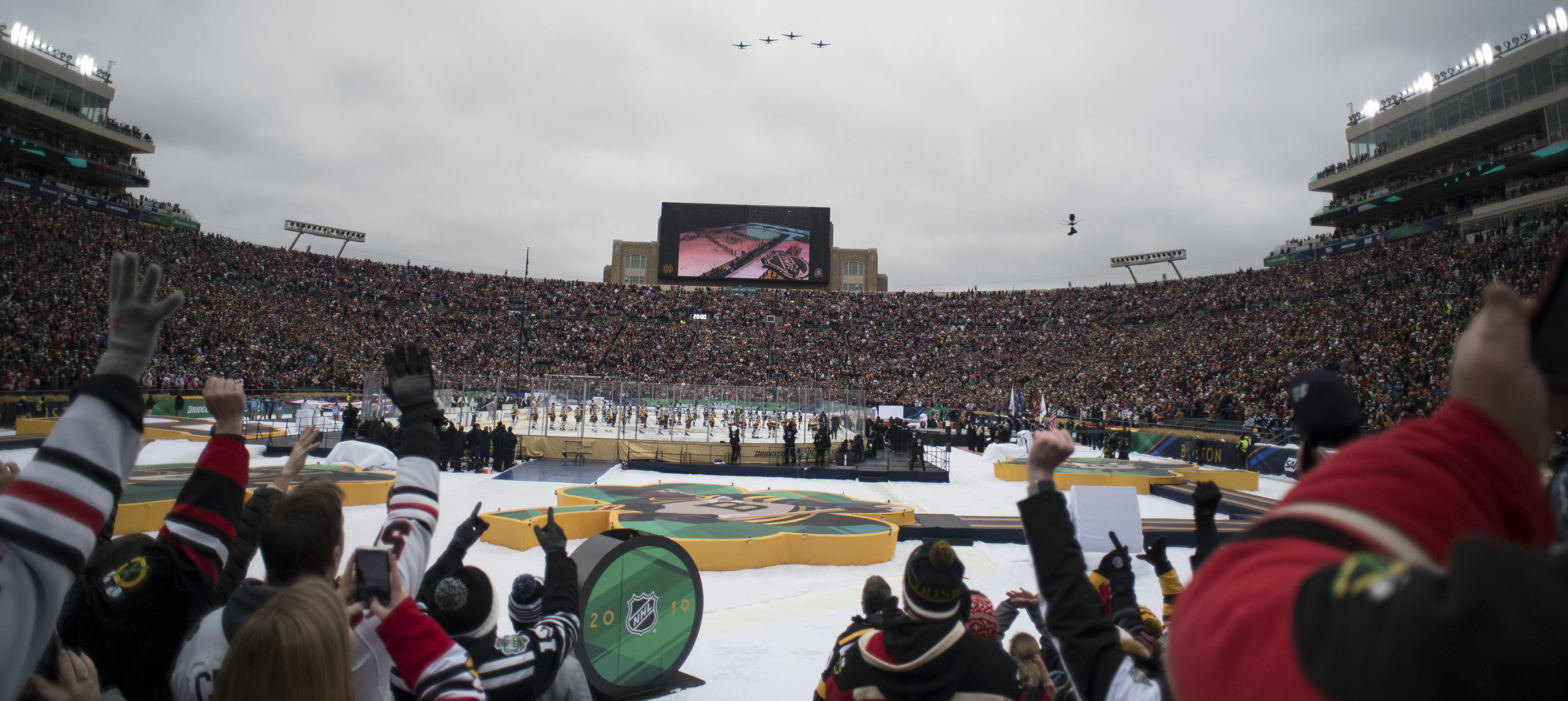
Flypast during the national anthem

A pre-game performance was conducted by the Jacks, Weezer performed a three-song concert during the first intermission including their hit cover of "Africa" by Toto, and Judah & the Lion performed a three-song concert during the second intermission.

During the team introductions, the South Bend Symphony Orchestra performed the Notre Dame Victory March.

The anthem was performed by the Blackhawks' anthem singer Jim Cornelison accompanied by the South Bend Symphony Orchestra. This is Cornelison's second time singing the anthem at the Winter Classic; the first was in 2009.

A ceremonial puck drop was done by Notre Dame legend Tim Brown.

Prior to team introductions the Bruins' and Blackhawks' legends were introduced: for the Bruins, Cam Neely, Johnny Bucyk, and Ray Bourque; for the Blackhawks, Denis Savard, Tony Esposito, Jill Mikita, representing the late Stan Mikita, and Bobby Hull.

On their way out of the tunnel for team introductions, the Blackhawks were greeted by Notre Dame football legends Rocket Ismail, Brian Smith, Darius Fleming, Reggie Brooks, and Autry Denson.

== Broadcasting ==
NBC broadcast the game as it has done since the event's inception. Like the previous two Winter Classics, Sportsnet simulcast the NBC feed in Canada, while TVA Sports used NBC's video to dub their French-language commentary.

The game was simulcast on NBC Sports Radio; it was the last program carried on the network before it converted to a part-time syndication service that day.

=== Ratings ===
Viewership for the 2019 Winter Classic jumped 20% over the previous season, rising to a 1.94 overnight rating and 2.97 million overall viewers, recovering three years of viewership declines.
