= 2023 NHL Winter Classic =

Hockey game held in Boston, Massachusetts

	1	2	3	Total
Pittsburgh Penguins	0	1	0	1
Boston Bruins	0	0	2	2
- Date: January 2, 2023
- Venue: Fenway Park
- City: Boston
- Attendance: 39,243

The 2023 NHL Winter Classic was an outdoor ice hockey game played in the National Hockey League (NHL) on January 2, 2023, at Fenway Park in Boston. The 14th edition of the Winter Classic, it matched the Boston Bruins against the Pittsburgh Penguins; the Bruins won 2–1.

== Background ==
On February 4, 2022, the NHL announced that the 2023 NHL Winter Classic would take place at Fenway Park, hosted by the Boston Bruins. Fenway Park became the first venue to host two Winter Classics, having previously hosted the 2010 NHL Winter Classic.

ESPN reported in February 2022 that the Pittsburgh Penguins would likely be the opponent after Fenway Sports Group, owner of Fenway Park, took over majority control of the Penguins in December 2021. The league confirmed that it would be the Penguins on April 13.

The NHL moved the Winter Classic to Monday, January 2, as it had in 2012 and 2017, declining to hold the event on a Sunday. In addition, the game returned to its customary afternoon start time (2 p.m. EST).

== Game summary ==
January 2, 2023	Pittsburgh Penguins	1–2	Boston Bruins	Fenway Park	Recap

Scoring summary
Period	Team	Goal	Assist(s)	Time	Score
1st	No scoring				
2nd	PIT	Kasperi Kapanen (6)	Danton Heinen (8) and Jeff Carter (12)	08:40	1–0 PIT
3rd	BOS	Jake DeBrusk (15)	Brad Marchand (21) and Matt Grzelcyk (9)	07:46	1–1
3rd	BOS	Jake DeBrusk (16)	Taylor Hall (15) and David Krejci (18)	17:36	2–1 BOS

Number in parentheses represents the player's total in goals or assists to that point of the season

Penalty summary
Period	Team	Player	Penalty	Time	PIM
1st	PIT	Teddy Blueger	Boarding	17:33	2:00
2nd	PIT	Pierre-Olivier Joseph	Interference	02:24	2:00
2nd	BOS	David Pastrnak	Holding	02:34	2:00
2nd	BOS	Hampus Lindholm	High-sticking	04:38	2:00
3rd	BOS	Matt Grzelcyk	Tripping	01:11	2:00
3rd	PIT	Brian Dumoulin	Tripping	05:40	2:00

Shots by period
Team	1	2	3	Total
PIT	14	6	7	27
BOS	10	9	10	29

Power play opportunities
Team	Goals/Opportunities
Pittsburgh	0/3
Boston	0/3

Three star selections
	Team	Player	Statistics
1st	BOS	Jake DeBrusk	2 goals
2nd	PIT	Kasperi Kapanen	1 goal
3rd	BOS	Linus Ullmark	26 saves

== Team rosters ==
Pittsburgh Penguins
#		Player	Position
1	(United States)	Casey DeSmith	G
2	(United States)	Chad Ruhwedel	D
8	(United States)	Brian Dumoulin (A)	D
16	(United States)	Jason Zucker	LW
17	(United States)	Bryan Rust	RW
23	(Canada)	Brock McGinn	LW
24	(Canada)	Ty Smith	D
28	(Sweden)	Marcus Pettersson	D
35	(Canada)	Tristan Jarry	G
42	(Finland)	Kasperi Kapanen	RW
43	(Canada)	Danton Heinen	LW/RW
44	(Czech Republic)	Jan Rutta	D
52	(Canada)	Mark Friedman	D
53	(Latvia)	Teddy Blueger	C
59	(United States)	Jake Guentzel	LW
67	(Sweden)	Rickard Rakell	LW/RW
71	(Russia)	Evgeni Malkin (A)	C
73	(Canada)	Pierre-Olivier Joseph	D
77	(Canada)	Jeff Carter	C/RW
87	(Canada)	Sidney Crosby (C)	C
Head coach: (United States) Mike Sullivan

Boston Bruins
#		Player	Position
1	(United States)	Jeremy Swayman	G
11	(United States)	Trent Frederic	C
12	(United States)	Craig Smith	RW
13	(United States)	Charlie Coyle	C
17	(United States)	Nick Foligno	LW
18	(Czech Republic)	Pavel Zacha	C
25	(United States)	Brandon Carlo	D
27	(Sweden)	Hampus Lindholm	D
28	(United States)	Derek Forbort	D
35	(Sweden)	Linus Ullmark	G
37	(Canada)	Patrice Bergeron (C)	C
46	(Czech Republic)	David Krejci (A)	C
48	(United States)	Matt Grzelcyk	D
63	(Canada)	Brad Marchand (A)	LW
71	(Canada)	Taylor Hall	LW
73	(United States)	Charlie McAvoy	D
74	(Canada)	Jake DeBrusk	LW
75	(United States)	Connor Clifton	D
88	(Czech Republic)	David Pastrnak	RW
92	(Czech Republic)	Tomas Nosek	C
Head coach: (Canada) Jim Montgomery

== Entertainment ==
Bell Biv DeVoe, accompanied by the Boston Pops Orchestra, performed the national anthem while the Black Keys performed during the first intermission. Following the anthem, a ceremonial "puck pitch" was done by Red Sox alumni players Jason Varitek and Tim Wakefield along with Boston Bruins alumni Johnny Bucyk, Zdeno Chara, and Bobby Orr. The Boston Pops also served as the house band during the game. Country music artist Sam Hunt performed during pregame.

== Broadcasting ==
The game was broadcast by TNT in the U.S. and Sportsnet in Canada. Warner Bros. Discovery Sports reported that the game was the most-watched regular season hockey game of all-time on cable in the United States, averaging 1.8 million viewers throughout the broadcast and peaking at 2.1 million viewers toward the end of the game.
