= 2018 NHL Winter Classic =

Outdoor National Hockey League game in Queens, New York

	1	2	3	OT	Total
New York Rangers	2	0	0	1	3
Buffalo Sabres	0	1	1	0	2
- Date: January 1, 2018
- Venue: Citi Field
- City: New York City
- Attendance: 41,821

The 2018 NHL Winter Classic (officially the 2018 Bridgestone NHL Winter Classic) was an outdoor ice hockey game played in the National Hockey League (NHL) on January 1, 2018, at Citi Field in the New York City borough of Queens. The tenth edition of the Winter Classic, the game featured the New York Rangers at the Buffalo Sabres; the Rangers won, 3–2, on an overtime goal by J. T. Miller. The game marked the 10th anniversary of the Winter Classic.

The 2018 game marked the second Winter Classic for each team, following the Rangers' appearance in the 2012 event and the Sabres' in 2008. It was the Rangers' fourth outdoor game, having also appeared in the 2014 Stadium Series.

== Background ==
On March 15, 2017, Arthur Staple of Newsday reported that the game had been awarded to the New York Rangers. The Rangers originally had planned to play at Blaik Field at Michie Stadium on the campus of the United States Military Academy in West Point, New York but were unable to come up with an agreement to use that facility in time. Yankee Stadium, which hosted the Rangers' games in the 2014 NHL Stadium Series, was ruled out for the Winter Classic because it hosts college football's Pinstripe Bowl a week before the event. Instead, the Rangers reportedly reached an agreement with Citi Field, home of the New York Mets baseball team, to host the event. The same article identified the Buffalo Sabres as the Rangers' opponent. The Sabres were also in negotiations to host the event, both because it marked ten years since the inaugural Winter Classic and because the 2018 World Junior Ice Hockey Championships had already scheduled an outdoor game at New Era Field for late December 2017, which would have allowed the outdoor ice surface to be used for both that and the Winter Classic. League vice president Bill Daly argued that having two major outdoor games in the same facility so close together would have stretched the resources of Pegula Sports and Entertainment too thin, hence why New York City was chosen as the host site. The Sabres were chosen as the opponents in a thank-you gesture from NBC and the NHL for taking the risk on the inaugural Winter Classic in 2008, and the team's poor performance and declining television ratings (at a time when the Winter Classic's ratings are also declining) did not concern NBC.

On May 10, 2017, commissioner Gary Bettman officially announced that the 2018 Winter Classic would be played at Citi Field, and feature the New York Rangers against the Buffalo Sabres. In order to maintain the tax-exempt status of the Rangers' home arena, Madison Square Garden, the Rangers are designated as the away team for this game as a legal fiction. The tax exemption stipulates that it only applies if the Rangers do not "cease playing" home games at MSG, generally interpreted as playing any "home" game outside of MSG. Hence, the Rangers' Stadium Series games in 2014 were also subject to this fiction, and all games that the Rangers play at neutral sites (such as the 2011 NHL Premiere) have likewise listed the Rangers as the away team.

Despite being the designated home team, the Sabres wore a white throwback uniform during the game (current NHL custom has the home team wear color and the away team white). The uniform is primarily based on the Sabres' 1970s jersey and colors, with some elements borrowed from the team's Buffalo Bisons-inspired 40th Anniversary third jerseys from 2010 to 2012. The Rangers wore navy blue jerseys with the diagonal "RANGERS" lettering on the front of the jersey in white, inspired by the lettering worn by the team in the late 1920s, with the sleeve and waist striping inspired by the uniforms of the early 1930s.

== Game summary ==
January 1, 2018	New York Rangers	3–2	OT	Buffalo Sabres	Citi Field	Recap

The temperature at the puck drop was 20 degrees. The Rangers went up 2-0 in the first period with goals by Paul Carey and Michael Grabner. Buffalo's Sam Reinhart had a power play goal in the second period, and then Rasmus Ristolainen tied the game early in the third. The game went into overtime, where J. T. Miller scored on a power play goal with 2:17 left in the extra period to win the game.

Scoring summary
Period	Team	Goal	Assist(s)	Time	Score
1st	NYR	Paul Carey (5)	Jesper Fast (10) and Cristoval Nieves (7)	04:09	NYR 1–0
1st	NYR	Michael Grabner (18)	Kevin Hayes (8) and J. T. Miller (19)	08:20	NYR 2–0
2nd	BUF	Sam Reinhart (6) – pp	Kyle Okposo (12) and Rasmus Ristolainen (11)	00:56	NYR 2-1
3rd	BUF	Rasmus Ristolainen (2)	Ryan O'Reilly (16) and Kyle Okposo (13)	00:27	2–2
OT	NYR	J. T. Miller (8) - pp	Kevin Shattenkirk (18) and Mats Zuccarello (22)	02:43	NYR 3–2

Number in parentheses represents the player's total in goals or assists to that point of the season

Penalty summary
Period	Team	Player	Penalty	Time	PIM
1st	BUF	Zach Bogosian	Roughing	00:38	2:00
1st	NYR	Brendan Smith	Tripping	13:59	2:00
1st	NYR	Kevin Hayes	Hooking	17:27	2:00
1st	NYR	Nick Holden	Hooking	19:37	2:00
2nd	BUF	Zach Bogosian	Holding	03:39	2:00
2nd	NYR	Bench (served by J. T. Miller)	Too many men on the ice	08:44	2:00
2nd	NYR	Ryan McDonagh	Tripping	13:57	2:00
3rd	No penalties				
OT	BUF	Jacob Josefson	Tripping	02:15	2:00

Shots by period
Team	1	2	3	OT	Total
Rangers	16	10	12	4	42
Buffalo	13	11	8	1	33

Power play opportunities
Team	Goals/Opportunities
Rangers	1/3
Buffalo	1/5

Three star selections
	Team	Player	Statistics
1st	NYR	J. T. Miller	1 goal, 1 assist
2nd	BUF	Robin Lehner	39 saves
3rd	NYR	Kevin Hayes	1 assist

== Broadcasting ==
The game was broadcast, as it has been since the Winter Classic's inception, by NBC in the United States. In Canada, Sportsnet simulcast the NBC feed, while TVA Sports used NBC's video to dub their French-language commentary. Mike Emrick called the game on the play-by-play with Mike Milbury filling-in for Eddie Olczyk as color commentator while he recovered from colon cancer treatments, and Jeremy Roenick taking over Milbury's pregame role.

The broadcast of the game set a record low for viewership of the game, with 2.48 million viewers and a 1.4 Nielsen rating, both down slightly from the previous year's record low and continuing the game's continuous decline in ratings since the event's peak in 2014. NBC, however, stated that viewership was still two times higher than the average viewership of regular season games in the previous season. Audience burnout, the Sabres' poor play (which drove ratings for the Sabres' regional telecasts for that season down 20 percent compared to the previous year), competition from a strong slate of bowl games (including the UCF Knights football team's bid for a perfect season airing on the 2018 Peach Bowl opposite the Winter Classic), and fan hangover after the Buffalo Bills broke their 17-year playoff drought the previous day were cited as factors in the continued ratings decline.

== Pregame/Anthem/Entertainment ==
During the team introductions, Ace Frehley performed New York Groove

The anthem was performed by New York City Children's Choir Every Voice Choirs

The ceremonial puck drop was done by first responders from NYPD, FDNY, and New York State Police

During the first intermission Goo Goo Dolls performed
