= NHL Winter Classic =

North American ice hockey game

NHL Winter Classic La Classique Hivernale de la LNH

National Hockey League
- First played: January 1, 2008
- Times held: 17
- Teams participated: 17
- Most appearances: Chicago Blackhawks
- Most wins: 3: Boston Bruins; St. Louis Blues; New York Rangers
- Most recent: January 2, 2026
- Most recent winner: New York Rangers

The NHL Winter Classic (French: La Classique Hivernale de la LNH) is an annual outdoor ice hockey game played during the National Hockey League's (NHL) regular season on or around New Year's Day. It is generally held in a football or baseball stadium in the United States in an area with a resident NHL team, but for most of the game's existence, it is usually played in a baseball stadium to avoid scheduling and logistical conflicts with football stadiums during the National Football League regular season. The Winter Classic is distinct from the league's two other series of outdoor games, the NHL Heritage Classic and the NHL Stadium Series. The first Winter Classic was held in 2008 at Ralph Wilson Stadium (later the first Highmark Stadium) (Note: Not to be confused with the current Highmark Stadium, which opened in 2026.) in Orchard Park, New York, between the Buffalo Sabres and Pittsburgh Penguins. Seventeen Winter Classics have been held as of January 2026. The most recent game was played during the 2025–26 NHL season at LoanDepot Park in Miami, with the New York Rangers defeating the Florida Panthers 5−1.

After the success of the Cold War at Michigan State University in 2001 and the 2003 Heritage Classic, the NHL's first regular season outdoor game, the league inaugurated the Winter Classic in 2008. It caught on as a league tradition and has been played every year since except for 2013 (due to the 2012–13 NHL lockout) and 2021 (due to the COVID-19 pandemic). The 2014 game between the Toronto Maple Leafs and the Detroit Red Wings set a new NHL attendance record of 105,491. The Winter Classic has been contested only in the United States, while the Heritage Classic has been held exclusively in Canada. The Winter Classic featured only American teams for its first five games, until the Maple Leafs' appearance in 2014.

Along with the NHL All-Star Game, the Winter Classic was considered one of the NHL's premier events; with matchups generally booked to showcase the league's most popular teams and players, the event garners the league its highest attendance and among its highest television ratings. The event is typically promoted as a return to the sport's outdoor roots, meant to evoke memories of pond hockey. Its popularity has led to the scheduling of additional outdoor hockey games, both in the NHL and other leagues worldwide. In May 2014, the SportsBusiness Journal and SportsBusiness Daily named the Winter Classic its "Sports Event of the Year", the second time in five years the Classic has won that distinction. As of 2026, television viewership of the Winter Classic has declined, with the NHL having moved it from New Year's Day in order to avoid competition from college football bowl games.

== History ==
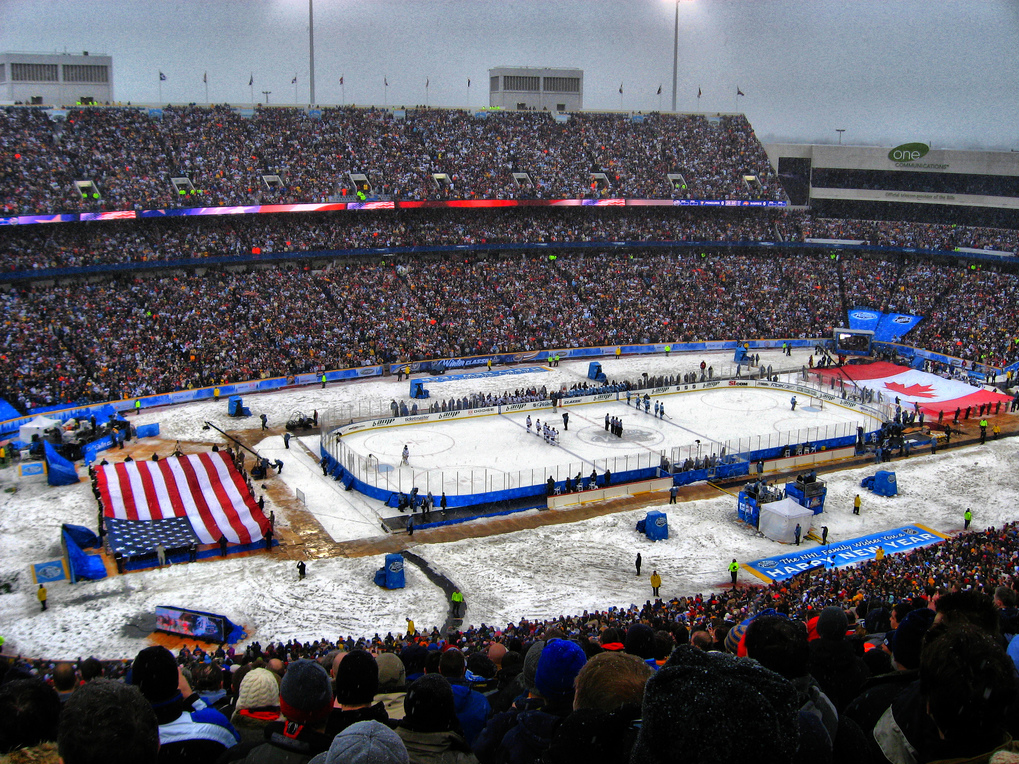
Ralph Wilson Stadium, near Buffalo, during the first Winter Classic in 2008

The Winter Classic as a television event was presented by NBC Sports Executive VP Jon Miller. He pitched the idea to the NHL in 2004, "but they didn't find the concept workable." In December 2006, Miller found an ally in then Executive VP/Business & Media John Collins, who embraced the idea.

The first Winter Classic was held January 1, 2008, between the Buffalo Sabres and Pittsburgh Penguins at Ralph Wilson Stadium in Orchard Park, New York. The game had a then-NHL-record crowd of 71,217 fans in attendance. The success of the 2008 NHL Winter Classic led the NHL to schedule a second one for 2009, held at Wrigley Field in Chicago, Illinois, on January 1, 2009, matching the Detroit Red Wings against the Chicago Blackhawks. That game had the highest American television ratings of any hockey game in 33 years.

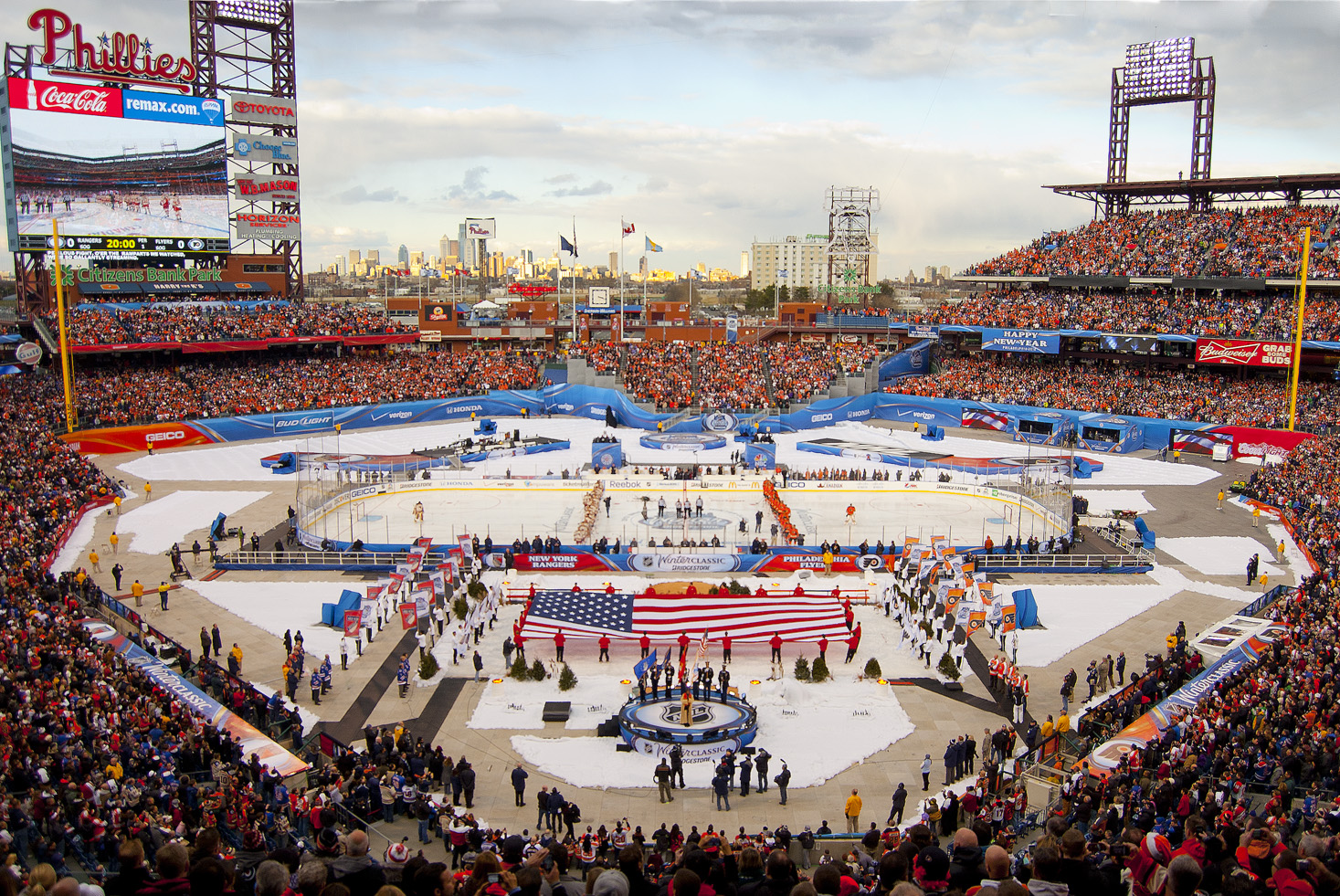
The fifth Winter Classic was held in 2012 at Citizens Bank Park in Philadelphia

Weather has proven to affect the game, with the 2011 and 2012 classics being delayed due to rain and other weather. Outdoor effects of wind and sun glare may give an unfair advantage to one team and so the NHL sometimes modifies the third and overtime periods. In that case, play is stopped at the midway point, and the teams switch directions. The option was exercised in 2008, 2009, 2011, 2014, and 2018. The 2008, 2014, and 2018 games also featured the teams switching ends halfway through the five-minute overtime period for the same reason. In 2008 and 2014. the games went into a shootout, with both goaltenders alternated defending the same goal, rather than the normal practice of defending opposite goals.

The Winter Classic was made a part of the NHL schedule through at least January 1, 2021, as part of the league's television contract, initially with NBC and Versus, then just NBC after Comcast (the parent company of Versus) bought NBC and merged Versus into the NBC Sports banner.

The 2012 Winter Classic in Philadelphia was not played on New Year's Day, as that fell on a Sunday in 2012 and conflicted with the NFL's final week of regular season games. Instead, following precedent set by college football's bowl games (which move their games to Monday when January 1 lands on Sunday) and to prevent the risk of a weather delay pushing the game into the timeslot for NBC Sunday Night Football, the game took place on January 2, 2012. The game was played at Citizens Bank Park, home of the Philadelphia Phillies. Neighboring Lincoln Financial Field, home of the Philadelphia Eagles, was reportedly preferred, but as the Eagles hosted a home game on January 1, the NHL could not undertake the required week-long renovations needed to construct the outdoor playing arena. The New York Rangers defeated the Philadelphia Flyers 3–2.

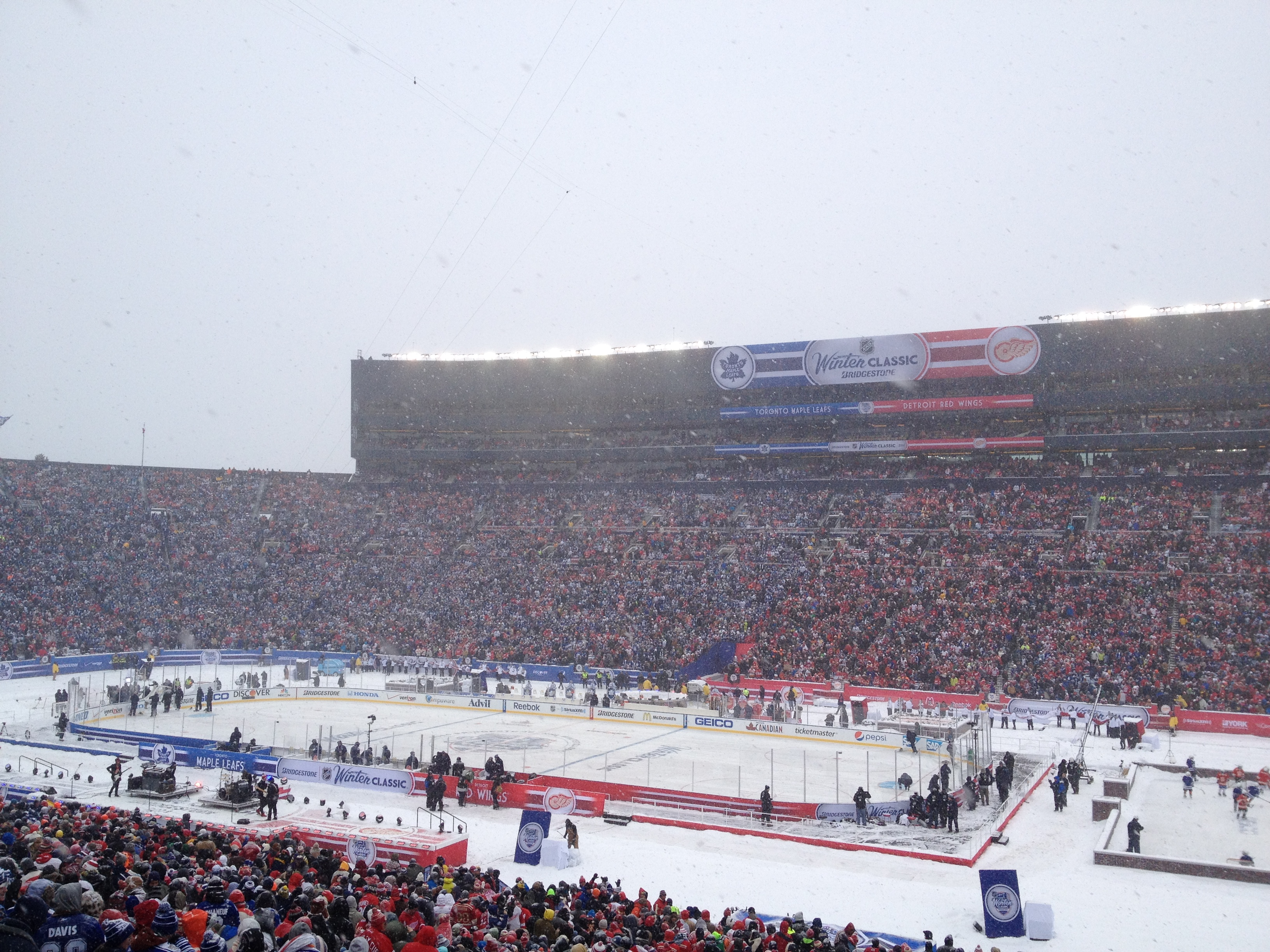
The 2014 Winter Classic at Michigan Stadium saw over 105,000 fans in attendance, setting an NHL record

The sixth Winter Classic was scheduled for Michigan Stadium in Ann Arbor in 2013, with the Detroit Red Wings hosting the Toronto Maple Leafs in an Original Six matchup. However, the 2012–13 NHL lockout disrupted the season, leading to the game's cancellation on November 2, 2012. The matchup was rescheduled for the 2014 Winter Classic, at the same venue with the same participants. It was the first time a Canadian team participated in the Winter Classic. An NHL-record total of 105,491 tickets were sold, greater than the Guinness World Records-certified world-record attendance of 104,173 at The Big Chill at the Big House, also held at Michigan Stadium. However, on January 24, 2014, an NHL source reported that the certified attendance, based on tickets scanned at the venue, fell short of the world record.

In 2017, the Winter Classic was the second of two outdoor games to be held over the New Year's weekend, with the NHL Centennial Classic being held in Toronto on January 1 and the Winter Classic following on January 2. The St. Louis Blues defeated the Chicago Blackhawks by the score of 4–1, scoring 3 goals in the third period.

To celebrate the tenth anniversary of the first Winter Classic, the NHL announced on May 10, 2017, that the Buffalo Sabres would take part in the 2018 game against the New York Rangers at Citi Field. Due to a 1982 agreement with New York City and state tax laws that give their home arena Madison Square Garden tax-exempt status, the Rangers must not "cease playing" home games at MSG (which is generally interpreted as meaning playing a home game at any other venue), and thus Rangers hosted the game but played as the visiting team. The arrangement gave the Sabres only 40 games for the 2017–18 season in their home city of Buffalo, while the Rangers played 42 games (not counting away games against the New York Islanders) in New York City. The NHL had used a similar policy for the Rangers in the 2014 Stadium Series and the 2011 NHL Premiere. The game was played on January 1, 2018.

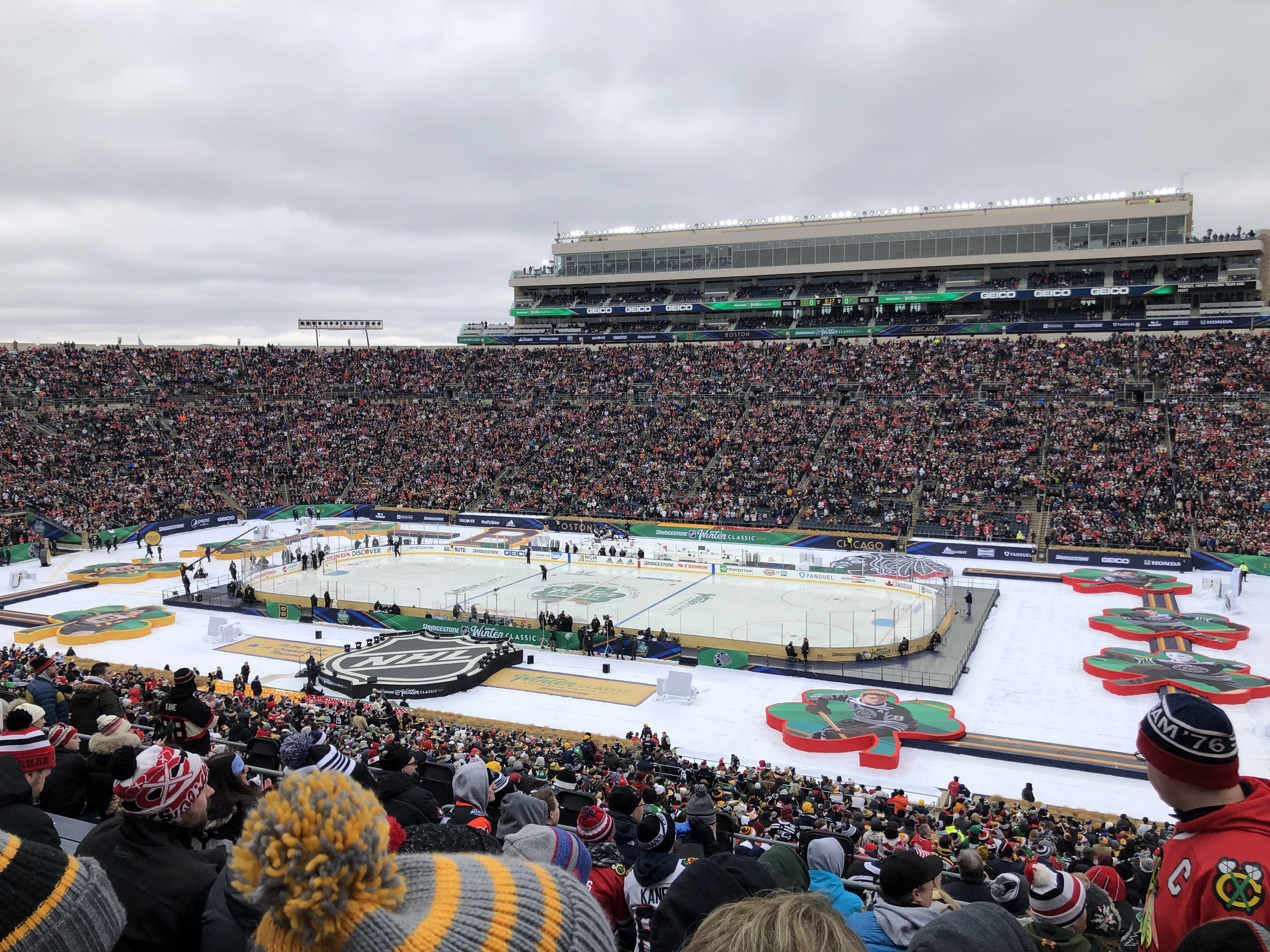
The 2019 Winter Classic was hosted at Notre Dame Stadium in Notre Dame, Indiana.

On November 18, 2017, the NHL announced that the Chicago Blackhawks would host the Boston Bruins in the Winter Classic scheduled for January 1, 2019. The game was played at Notre Dame Stadium, on the campus of the University of Notre Dame in Indiana, and was the first instance of a Winter Classic being played in a different state and media market from the host team—the stadium is located less than 100 mi (160 km) from Chicago but is served by television stations in South Bend.

The NHL announced on January 26, 2019 that the Dallas Stars would host the Nashville Predators in the 2020 Winter Classic at the Cotton Bowl in Dallas, Texas. It would be the first Winter Classic to take place at a warm-climate city and the first outdoor game for both the Predators and the Stars. The Stars won the game 4–2 in front of 85,630 fans, the second largest attendance in an NHL game behind the 2014 Winter Classic.

The league originally announced on January 1, 2020 that the 2021 NHL Winter Classic would feature the Minnesota Wild at Target Field in Minneapolis, Minnesota. The league later confirmed the St. Louis Blues as the opponent. However, due to the COVID-19 pandemic delaying the conclusion of the 2019–20 season to September and postponing the start of the following season, the event was moved to 2022 at its earliest. With a temperature of -5.7 °F at puck drop, the 2022 Winter Classic became the coldest outdoor game in NHL history as the Blues won 6–4.

In 2021, the NHL ended its relationship with NBC and signed new agreements with ESPN and TNT. As ESPN has a full slate of college bowl games on New Year's Day, TNT will hold rights to the Winter Classic throughout the entire broadcast contract.

On February 4, 2022, the NHL announced that Fenway Park would be the site of the 2023 NHL Winter Classic. As a result, Fenway Park became the third outdoor stadium to host multiple outdoor games, and the first to host two Winter Classics. On April 13, 2022, the Penguins were announced as the opponent with the game being held on January 2 (as January 1, 2023 fell on Sunday). The Bruins won the game, 2–1.

On January 2, 2023, the day of the 2023 Winter Classic, NHL commissioner Gary Bettman announced on the game's pregame show that the Seattle Kraken would host the 2024 edition of the Winter Classic at T-Mobile Park, playing against the Vegas Golden Knights. This was the first Winter Classic to be held on the American West Coast and the first between Pacific Division opponents. This was also the first Winter Classic, and the second NHL outdoor game, to take place in a retractable roof stadium. (Note: The 2014 Heritage Classic took place at Vancouver's BC Place, a retractable roof stadium. Due to rain, the roof was closed for the game.) Due to Seattle's rainy climate that may affect ice conditions, organizers planned on closing the T-Mobile Park roof in case of heavy rainfall. The game ended with the Kraken becoming the first team to earn a shutout in a Winter Classic, defeating the Golden Knights 3–0.

On February 7, 2024, it was announced that the 2025 NHL Winter Classic would take place at Wrigley Field in Chicago, with the Chicago Blackhawks facing the St. Louis Blues. Wrigley Field joined Fenway Park as the only two-time hosts of a Winter Classic, and it also marked the first repeat matchup in a Winter Classic, with the Blackhawks and Blues previously facing off at Busch Stadium in 2017. It was then announced that the game would take place on December 31, 2024, which marked the first Winter Classic to take place on New Year's Eve, and the first time two Winter Classics were held in a calendar year. The move to New Year's Eve was an effort—one that was ultimately unsuccessful—to minimize competition against ESPN's bowl games, particularly with the expansion of the College Football Playoff, which scheduled its quarterfinal round as a full-day block on New Year's Day and prime time New Year's Eve.

On January 8, 2025, the NHL announced that the 2026 NHL Winter Classic would take place at LoanDepot Park in Miami, with the Florida Panthers hosting the New York Rangers. That marked the Panthers' first outdoor game, the second Winter Classic at a retractable roof stadium, and the southernmost outdoor game in the NHL. The game took place on January 2, 2026, the first Winter Classic to be played on January 2 that did not fall on a Monday.

On January 7, 2026, the NHL announced that the 2027 NHL Winter Classic will take place at Rice–Eccles Stadium in Salt Lake City, with the Utah Mammoth hosting the Colorado Avalanche. Utah's participation will result in all 32 active NHL teams having participated in an outdoor game. The 2027 Winter Classic would be played on December 31, 2026, New Year's Eve.

== Possible future sites ==
NHL Commissioner Gary Bettman indicated in October 2025 that the NHL was in the process of negotiating for the 2028 Winter Classic to be held at the new Highmark Stadium (which replaced the former Highmark Stadium, known for most of its history as Ralph Wilson Stadium, in 2026) to celebrate the event's 20th anniversary; he also stated that though he could not commit to the exact timeline, he promised that the Winter Classic would eventually return to Western New York.

Due to the popularity of the event, every NHL team has requested to participate in the Winter Classic either as the host or the visiting team. The NHL has marketed the Winter Classic as a more achievable major sporting event that cities that are ineligible for hosting other marquee sporting events such as the Super Bowl can host. While proposals have been made for nearly every outdoor National Football League (NFL) stadium to host, with the end of the NFL season taking place at the same time of the Winter Classic, in order to host the game the stadium's NFL team would have to play an away game (or host Thursday Night Football dependent on the calendar) to even consider the possibility of hosting. The tight timeline would also rule out the ability for other support events such as alumni games or local college/lower level hockey games, as the rink would have to be disassembled immediately after the Winter Classic to ensure venue availability for NFL playoff games, which could be held at other venues, as was the case in 2008 (when the Sabres alumni game was held indoors at the Sabres' home arena) and 2014 (when the Hockeytown Winter Festival was held at a separate stadium).

While some college football stadiums are unavailable to host due to already existing bowl games, most of these games are held in warmer winter climates, opening up the possibility of the largest Big Ten Conference stadiums such as Michigan Stadium (which hosted in 2014), Ohio Stadium, Beaver Stadium, and other large stadiums such as Notre Dame Stadium (which hosted in 2019). Most Major League Soccer soccer-specific stadiums have seating capacities significantly lower than the other available facilities. With Major League Baseball (MLB) in its offseason and with few other uses for its stadiums during winter, more MLB stadiums have hosted than other type of venue and are expected to be contenders for hosting most future Winter Classics.

Non-sports venues like the National Mall or Central Park have also been proposed, but the present logistical challenges make the league unlikely to want to overcome with the other options available.

== List of NHL Winter Classics ==
| No. | Year | Venue | Sport of venue | Primary team at venue | Location | Visiting team | Home team | Score | Attendance |
|---|---|---|---|---|---|---|---|---|---|
| 1st | 2008 | Ralph Wilson Stadium | Football | Buffalo Bills | Orchard Park, New York | **Pittsburgh Penguins** | Buffalo Sabres | 2–1 (SO) | 71,217 |
| 2nd | 2009 | Wrigley Field | Baseball | Chicago Cubs | Chicago, Illinois | **Detroit Red Wings** | Chicago Blackhawks | 6–4 | 40,818 |
| 3rd | 2010 | Fenway Park | Baseball | Boston Red Sox | Boston, Massachusetts | Philadelphia Flyers | **Boston Bruins** | 1–2 (OT) | 38,112 |
| 4th | 2011 | Heinz Field | Football | Pittsburgh Steelers | Pittsburgh, Pennsylvania | **Washington Capitals** | Pittsburgh Penguins | 3–1 | 68,111 |
| 5th | 2012 | Citizens Bank Park | Baseball | Philadelphia Phillies | Philadelphia, Pennsylvania | **New York Rangers** | Philadelphia Flyers | 3–2 | 46,967 |
| 6th | 2013 | Michigan Stadium | College football | Michigan Wolverines | Ann Arbor, Michigan | **Toronto Maple Leafs** | Detroit Red Wings | Postponed to January 2014 due to the lockout | |
| 6th | 2014 | Michigan Stadium | College football | Michigan Wolverines | Ann Arbor, Michigan | **Toronto Maple Leafs** | Detroit Red Wings | 3–2 (SO) | 105,491 |
| 7th | 2015 | Nationals Park | Baseball | Washington Nationals | Washington, D.C. | Chicago Blackhawks | **Washington Capitals** | 2–3 | 42,832 |
| 8th | 2016 | Gillette Stadium | Football | New England Patriots | Foxborough, Massachusetts | **Montreal Canadiens** | Boston Bruins | 5–1 | 67,246 |
| 9th | 2017 | Busch Stadium | Baseball | St. Louis Cardinals | St. Louis, Missouri | Chicago Blackhawks | **St. Louis Blues** | 1–4 | 46,556 |
| 10th | 2018 | Citi Field | Baseball | New York Mets | Flushing, New York | **New York Rangers** | Buffalo Sabres | 3–2 (OT) | 41,821 |
| 11th | 2019 | Notre Dame Stadium | College football | Notre Dame Fighting Irish | Notre Dame, Indiana | **Boston Bruins** | Chicago Blackhawks | 4–2 | 76,126 |
| 12th | 2020 | Cotton Bowl | College football | Red River Rivalry | Dallas, Texas | Nashville Predators | **Dallas Stars** | 2–4 | 85,630 |
| 13th | 2021 | Target Field | Baseball | Minnesota Twins | Minneapolis, Minnesota | **St. Louis Blues** | Minnesota Wild | Postponed to January 2022 due to the COVID-19 pandemic | |
| 13th | 2022 | Target Field | Baseball | Minnesota Twins | Minneapolis, Minnesota | **St. Louis Blues** | Minnesota Wild | 6–4 | 38,519 |
| 14th | 2023 | Fenway Park | Baseball | Boston Red Sox | Boston, Massachusetts | Pittsburgh Penguins | **Boston Bruins** | 1–2 | 39,243 |
| 15th | 2024 | T-Mobile Park | Baseball | Seattle Mariners | Seattle, Washington | Vegas Golden Knights | **Seattle Kraken** | 0–3 | 47,313 |
| 16th | 2025 | Wrigley Field | Baseball | Chicago Cubs | Chicago, Illinois | **St. Louis Blues** | Chicago Blackhawks | 6–2 | 40,933 |
| 17th | 2026 | LoanDepot Park | Baseball | Miami Marlins | Miami, Florida | **New York Rangers** | Florida Panthers | 5–1 | 36,153 |
| 18th | 2027 | Rice–Eccles Stadium | College football | Utah Utes | Salt Lake City, Utah | Colorado Avalanche | Utah Mammoth | | |

- **Bolded** teams denote winners
- All games played on New Year's Day prior to 2025, except for 2012, 2017, and 2023, which were played on January 2 due to New Year's Day falling on a Sunday.

== Appearances ==
| Team | Appearances | Last | Wins | Losses |
|---|---|---|---|---|
| Chicago Blackhawks | 5 | 2025 | 0 | 5 |
| Boston Bruins | 4 | 2023 | 3 | 1 |
| St. Louis Blues | 3 | 2025 | 3 | 0 |
| Pittsburgh Penguins | 3 | 2023 | 1 | 2 |
| New York Rangers | 3 | 2026 | 3 | 0 |
| Washington Capitals | 2 | 2015 | 2 | 0 |
| Detroit Red Wings | 2 | 2014 | 1 | 1 |
| Buffalo Sabres | 2 | 2018 | 0 | 2 |
| Philadelphia Flyers | 2 | 2012 | 0 | 2 |
| Dallas Stars | 1 | 2020 | 1 | 0 |
| Montreal Canadiens | 1 | 2016 | 1 | 0 |
| Toronto Maple Leafs | 1 | 2014 | 1 | 0 |
| Seattle Kraken | 1 | 2024 | 1 | 0 |
| Minnesota Wild | 1 | 2022 | 0 | 1 |
| Nashville Predators | 1 | 2020 | 0 | 1 |
| Vegas Golden Knights | 1 | 2024 | 0 | 1 |
| Florida Panthers | 1 | 2026 | 0 | 1 |

=== Winning and losing teams ===
| Teams | Win | Loss | Total | Year(s) won | Year(s) lost |
|---|---|---|---|---|---|
| Boston Bruins | 3 | 1 | 4 | 2010, 2019, 2023 | 2016 |
| St. Louis Blues | 3 | 0 | 3 | 2017, 2022, 2025 | |
| New York Rangers | 3 | 0 | 3 | 2012, 2018, 2026 | |
| Washington Capitals | 2 | 0 | 2 | 2011, 2015 | |
| Pittsburgh Penguins | 1 | 2 | 3 | 2008 | 2011, 2023 |
| Detroit Red Wings | 1 | 1 | 2 | 2009 | 2014 |
| Dallas Stars | 1 | 0 | 1 | 2020 | |
| Montreal Canadiens | 1 | 0 | 1 | 2016 | |
| Seattle Kraken | 1 | 0 | 1 | 2024 | |
| Toronto Maple Leafs | 1 | 0 | 1 | 2014 | |
| Chicago Blackhawks | 0 | 5 | 5 | | 2009, 2015, 2017, 2019, 2025 |
| Buffalo Sabres | 0 | 2 | 2 | | 2008, 2018 |
| Minnesota Wild | 0 | 1 | 1 | | 2022 |
| Nashville Predators | 0 | 1 | 1 | | 2020 |
| Philadelphia Flyers | 0 | 2 | 2 | | 2010, 2012 |
| Vegas Golden Knights | 0 | 1 | 1 | | 2024 |
| Florida Panthers | 0 | 1 | 1 | | 2026 |

== Throwback sweaters ==
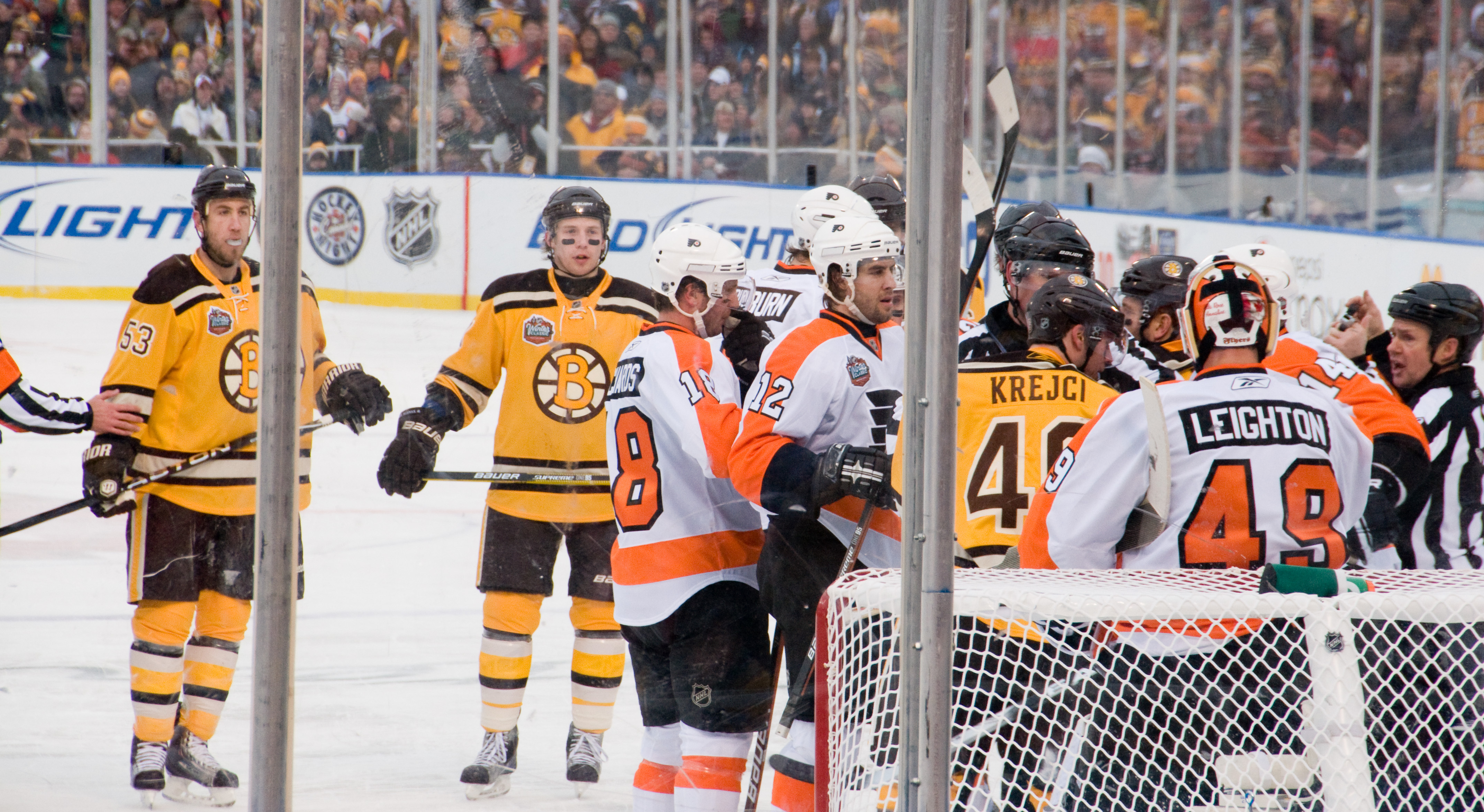
Teams often wear throwback, or retro-styled sweaters for the Winter Classic

For the Winter Classic, participating teams typically wear throwback, or retro-style sweaters, and occasionally retro-styled equipment. The throwback sweaters are popular with fans, and teams have often continued to wear them after the Winter Classic. The Penguins and Blackhawks made their Winter Classic sweaters their alternates the following season. The Flyers went a step further and made their 2010 Winter Classic sweaters their permanent road sweaters, beginning with 2010–11. The Sabres had already been using a variation of their throwback sweater prior to their appearance (that particular season, there were no third sweaters anywhere in the league) and adopted a slightly updated version of the sweaters as their main uniform in 2010–11, while the 2011 contestants, the Penguins and Capitals, wore their classic uniforms as third jerseys in 2011–12. The Capitals continued to do so through the 2014–15 season, the same year the Flyers adopted their 2012 Winter Classic sweaters as their third jerseys.

- 2008
  - Pittsburgh Penguins: 1970–71, worn as a third jersey from 2008 to 2011
  - Buffalo Sabres: 1983–84, a modernized version was released in 2021
- 2009

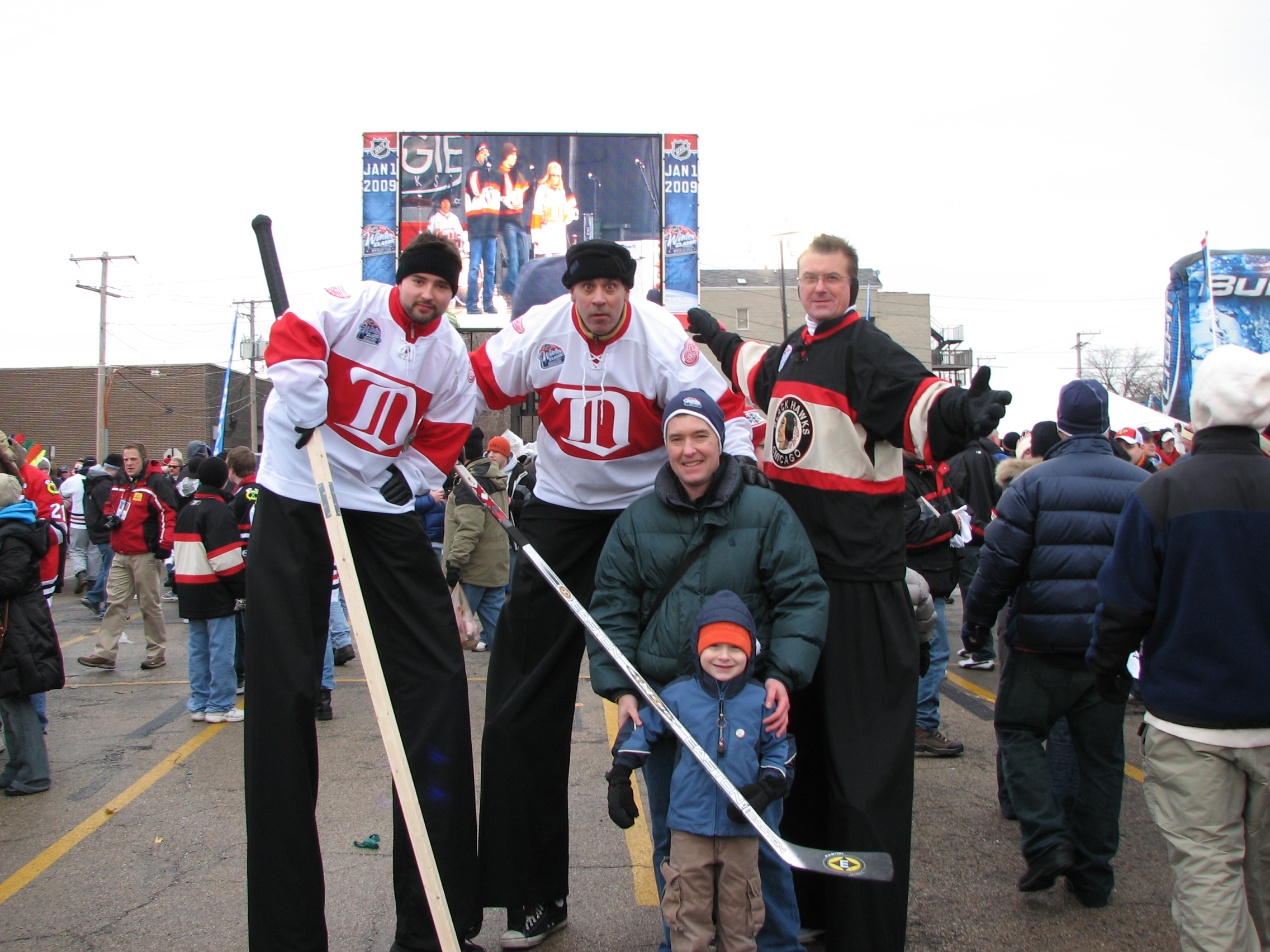
Fans on stilts adorned in the sweaters used for the 2009 Winter Classic

  - Detroit Red Wings: 1926–27 Detroit Cougars
  - Chicago Blackhawks: 1935–36 design with 1948–49 logo, worn as a third jersey from 2009 to 2011
- 2010
  - Philadelphia Flyers: 1973–74 with modern font for their numbers and a black nameplate, became permanent road jersey the following season.
  - Boston Bruins: 1958–59 design with brown stripes instead of black, and 1948–49 inspired logo (the original form of the "spoked-B" logo).
- 2011
  - Washington Capitals: 1974–75, worn as a third jersey from 2011 to 2015
  - Pittsburgh Penguins: 1967–68 sweater with colors reversed and crest logo instead of diagonal "Pittsburgh" lettering that appeared on original jerseys, worn as a third jersey from 2011 to 2013
- 2012
  - New York Rangers: Traditional sweater design in off-white with straight-lined player names and blue numbers with red trim in felt rather than drop-shadow tackle twill. Striping on shoulders, arms and tail is a variation of the ones they currently use, and crest logo a modern variation of the logo used for the team's inaugural season in 1926.
  - Philadelphia Flyers: Traditional sweater design in orange with black numbers and off-white trim. Striping on shoulders, arms and tail is different from the current sweaters. The stripe design was inspired by a sock design the team wore in the 1980s. Worn as a third jersey from 2014 to 2016.
- 2014
  - Toronto Maple Leafs: Toronto's uniforms were royal blue and white and featured the distinct striping configuration inspired by the 1930s Maple Leafs. The front crest of the jersey featured a distinct wordmark from the inaugural Maple Leafs' logo, revealed in 1927. The neckline design is taken from the sweaters worn by the Leafs throughout the 1960s and the running stitch detail on the numbers is a tribute to the Leafs' sweater from the mid-1950s.
  - Detroit Red Wings: Detroit wore red and antique white uniforms featuring a striping pattern and arch Detroit wordmark inspired by the late-1920s Detroit Cougars. The front crest on the jersey featured an early iteration of the winged wheel from the late 1930s Red Wings.
- 2015

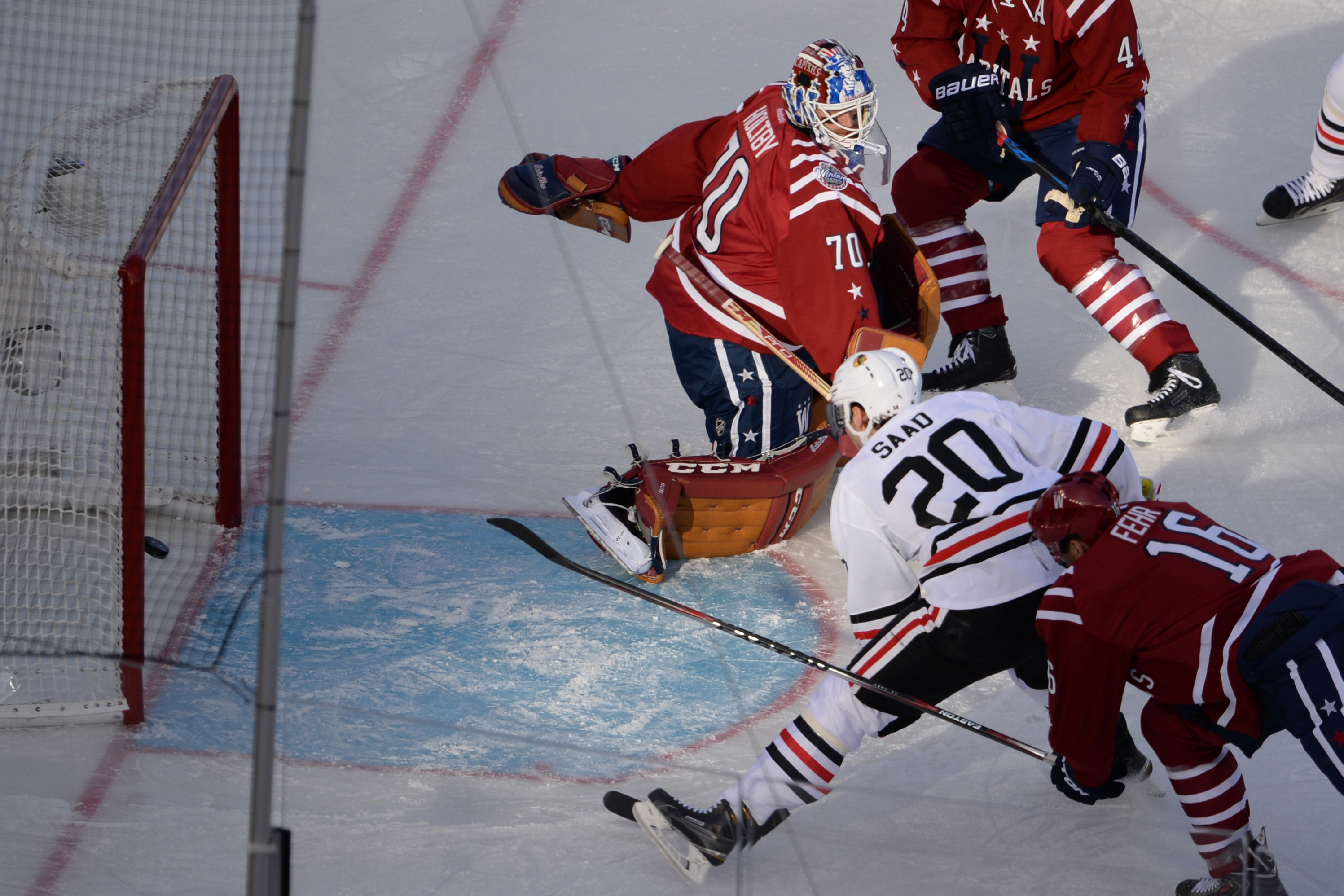
During the 2015 Winter Classic, the Chicago Blackhawks wore throwback sweaters, whereas the Washington Capitals wore a retro-styled sweater

  - Chicago Blackhawks: Chicago's jerseys were based on their 1957 jerseys, white with red and black striping on the bottom, lace-up collars and the tomahawk logo near the elbows.
  - Washington Capitals: While the Capitals' uniforms were not technically "throwbacks" because they represented a new uniform not previously worn by the team, they were a combined look back at hockey in D.C. Washington wore red sweaters (in a darker shade of red than the team's normal uniforms) with white stripes atop the shoulders and along the bottom, the front featuring the team's name in white over a large blue 'W', with the center of the 'W' stylized like the Washington Monument.
- 2016
  - Montreal Canadiens: Montreal's jerseys were based on the one they wore for the 1924–25 season. Having won the Stanley Cup the precedent season, the first in the team's history as a member of the NHL, the team put a globe with the word "Champions" under it. Since 1922, the team was using their classic CH logo with inverted colors (the C in white and the H in red): that logo was moved on both arms for the 1924–25 season. For the Winter Classic, the CH logo was put back as the team's crest while the globe moved on the arms. As for the jersey's colors, they traded place from the original version, the red becoming white and the white becoming red, similar to a jersey worn by the team between 1944 and 1947.
  - Boston Bruins: Boston also used a jersey based on the one they wore for the 1924–25 season, their first in the NHL. The jersey is identical to the one used that season, except for the fact that it is black instead of brown as it originally was. Worn as a third jersey in the 2016–17 season.
- 2017
  - Chicago Blackhawks: The jerseys from the 2015 Winter Classic returned for 2017. Chicago's jerseys were based on their 1957 jerseys, white with red and black stripping on the bottom, lace-up collars and the tomahawk logo near the elbows.
  - St. Louis Blues: St. Louis' uniforms were based on the inaugural 1967–68 home jersey. The jerseys feature historically accurate fonts and team striping, a ribbed crewneck collar, the vintage blue color and the original Blue Note crest from the first season. Worn as a third jersey since 2018.
- 2018
  - Buffalo Sabres: 1970s design and colors, with no gold trim on numbers and a small "NY" initial at the bottom of the logo. The "Buffalo" wordmark from the Buffalo Bisons-inspired throwbacks from 2010 is included on the helmet, and a new shoulder crest (a buffalo filled with the word "Sabres") was added.
  - New York Rangers: Rangers' jerseys were based on their 1926–27 jerseys from their inaugural season.
- 2019
  - Boston Bruins: The brown and gold jersey with heritage materials and striping that pays homage to the 1930s era uniform. Highlighting the throwback look, the jersey features the throwback "B" logo.
  - Chicago Blackhawks: black and white uniform that pays homage to the 1934 Blackhawks along with a Blackhawks crest featuring a combination of felt letters and chain stitching. Worn as a "Heritage" jersey for select games from 2019 to 2021.
- 2020
  - Dallas Stars: Green and white jersey with elements from the 1993–94 Dallas Stars jerseys (the Stars first year in Dallas) and the 1945–46 USHL's Dallas Texans jerseys (the first year of minor league hockey in Dallas).
  - Nashville Predators: Yellow, blue, and white striped jersey inspired by the 1960s and 1970s jersey of the Eastern Hockey League's Nashville Dixie Flyers, the first minor league hockey team in Nashville.
- 2022
  - St. Louis Blues: Vintage white version of 2017 Winter Classic uniform, modeled after the 1967–68 road uniforms.
  - Minnesota Wild: Green, red and wheat jersey inspired by various early Minnesota hockey teams.
- 2023
  - Pittsburgh Penguins: Vintage white uniform with black stripes and gold "P" logo taken from the 1925 Pittsburgh Pirates uniforms.
  - Boston Bruins: Black uniform with gold stripes and vintage white text. "BOSTON" arched wordmark inspired by the original "Spoked B" logo worn in 1949, and the original bear head logo from 1977 to 1995 was added.
- 2024
  - Vegas Golden Knights: Vintage white uniform with gold stripes, and stylized gray "V" logo. As Las Vegas did not have a deep history of ice hockey, the Golden Knights went with a faux-back uniform from 1917.
  - Seattle Kraken: Dark blue uniform with ice blue and vintage white stripes. Red "S" with team name in front. Uniform based on the 1917 Seattle Metropolitans.
- 2025
  - St. Louis Blues: Vintage white uniform with light blue and gold chest and sleeve stripes, incorporated the "ST. LOUIS" wordmark based on the prototype uniforms from 1966. Paid homage to St. Louis hockey history.
  - Chicago Blackhawks: Red uniform with black and vintage white chest and sleeve stripes, roundel logo inspired from the 1930s Blackhawks crest. Design took cues from previous Blackhawks uniforms.
- 2026
  - New York Rangers: Vintage white uniform with light blue and red stripes, essentially the road uniform version of their 2025–26 Centennial alternate uniform with the block "NEW YORK" diagonal wordmark.
  - Florida Panthers: Red uniform with navy blue stripes and gold barber-pole stripes based on the Miami Clippers of the Tropical Hockey League. "Leaping panther" crest is made of felt with chain stitching.

== Coverage ==
=== Television ratings ===
The Winter Classic was initially a major ratings success for the league in the United States and had regularly been the league's most watched regular season contest (in the US), rivaling the ratings for the Stanley Cup.

The 2014 Winter Classic between the Detroit Red Wings and the Toronto Maple Leafs had a television viewership in the U.S. and Canada of 8.2 million television viewers, a North American record for a regular season game; in addition to setting an NHL-record paid attendance of 105,491. Sportsnet's Chris Johnston said, "The feeling when the players walked into the 87-year-old stadium in front of more than 100,000 fans was truly something special. The biggest and best Winter Classic of them all lived up to its advanced billing." The game went down to the wire, ending in a 3–2 Toronto victory in a shootout.

By the time of the 2026 Winter Classic, the event had lost most of its viewership premium, as the Stadium Series and the regular season opening night had retained higher viewership while the Winter Classic continued to fall behind ordinary regular season games carried on its over-the-air network package.

==== Canada ====
Despite the overwhelming popularity of the original Heritage Classic between the Montreal Canadiens and the Edmonton Oilers in 2003, the popularity of the Winter Classic in Canada is not as high as it is in the United States. On Canada's CBC Television network, the Winter Classic has lower ratings than its weekly regular season telecasts Hockey Night in Canada. This has been attributed to the lack of Canadian teams in any of the Winter Classics and has led to both the revival of the all-Canadian Heritage Classic and the scheduling of the Maple Leafs in the 2014 Winter Classic and the Canadiens in the 2016 edition. Nevertheless, the Winter Classic continues to air on Canadian television, but since 2016 the games are moved to Sportsnet. In addition, Sportsnet elected to simulcast the American broadcast feed of the Winter Classic as opposed to sending their own broadcast crews, except when a Canadian team is involved (as was the case in the 2016 Winter Classic featuring the Canadiens).

==== United States ====
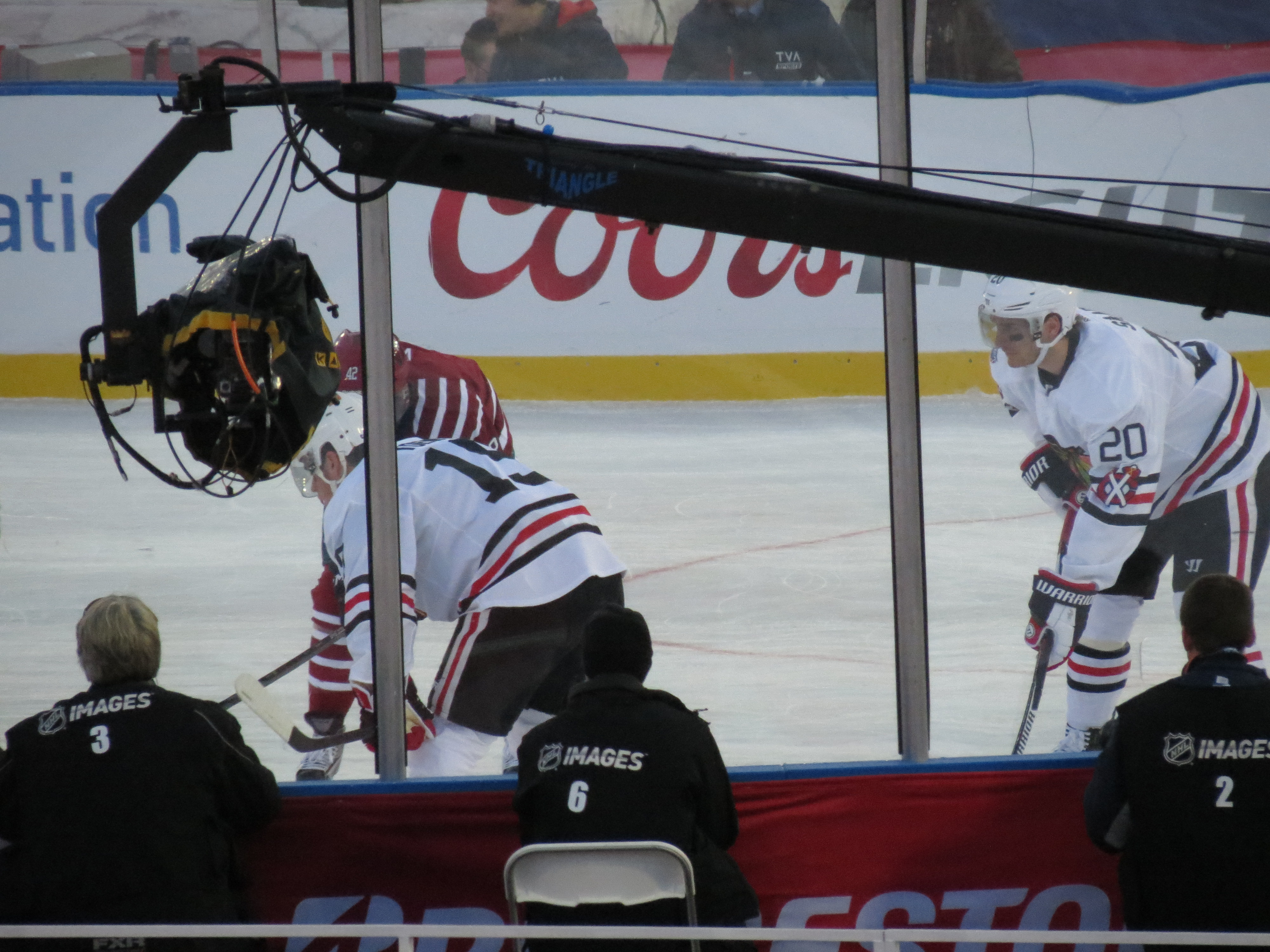
A television camera and media personnel at the 2015 Winter Classic. The event became the NHL most watched regular season game in the United States.

The Winter Classic games ranked among the most watched regular season NHL games on NBC when the network held the national U.S. broadcast rights from 2005 to 2021. Early entries in the Winter Classic ranked among the highest ratings for professional hockey in the U.S. since the 1970s, prior to that, the highest rating for an NHL game since then had been Wayne Gretzky's final game, which aired on Fox in 1999. Winter Classic viewership peaked in 2011 (due to it being rescheduled to primetime) and, with the exception of one-year bumps in 2014 and 2019, has been in a mostly steady decline since then.

TNT holds the rights to televise the Winter Classic from 2022 to 2028. The 2022 game thus became the first time that the Winter Classic aired exclusively on American cable television. 1.36 million people watched the game on TNT and it earned a 0.6 rating. This rating was a decline of 48% from the 2019 edition. However, the game had the widest audience in history of any NHL regular season game broadcast on cable. This was surpassed by the 2024 Winter Classic, which was viewed by only 1.1 million people (0.4 rating) combined on TNT and truTV. The 2025 Winter Classic took place on New Year's Eve in an attempt to avoid competing with the newly-expanded College Football Playoff bowl games. However, viewership dipped to under 1 million for the first time in the game's history. As a result, for the 2026 Winter Classic, the NHL moved the game to the evening of January 2. This event did see higher ratings, but only because of a change in methodology; had the ratings been measured the same way as previous years, its 823,000 measured viewers would have marked a continued decline.

| Year | Rating | Viewers | Network | Ref(s) |
|---|---|---|---|---|
| 2008 | 2.2 | 3.75 million | NBC | |
| 2009 | 2.5 | 4.40 million | NBC | |
| 2010 | 2.1 | 3.68 million | NBC | |
| 2011 | 2.3 | 4.50 million | NBC | |
| 2012 | 2.1 | 3.73 million | NBC | |
| 2014 | 2.5 | 4.40 million | NBC | |
| 2015 | 1.9 | 3.47 million | NBC | |
| 2016 | 1.6 | 2.78 million | NBC | |
| 2017 | 1.5 | 2.56 million | NBC | |
| 2018 | 1.4 | 2.48 million | NBC | |
| 2019 | 1.9 | 2.97 million | NBC | |
| 2020 | 1.1 | 1.96 million | NBC | |
| 2022 | 0.6 | 1.36 million | TNT | |
| 2023 | 0.6 | 1.77 million | TNT | |
| 2024 | 0.4 | 1.1 million | TNT truTV | |
| 2025 | | 0.92 million | TNT truTV | |
| 2026 | | 0.97 million | TNT truTV | |

=== Documentary series ===
In 2010, the NHL and HBO announced a four-part documentary series as part of the build-up to the 2011 Winter Classic. The series, entitled 24/7: Road to the NHL Winter Classic, gave HBO exclusive access to the teams that were participating in the game. HBO went on to air two more editions in 2012 and 2014.

For the 2015, 2016, and 2017 Winter Classics, the NHL partnered with Epix to air another series of four-part documentaries. The first two editions carried the Road to the NHL Winter Classic brand, but the 2017 edition was retitled Road to the NHL Outdoor Classics with the inclusion of the NHL Centennial Classic as part of the buildup.

Starting with the 2018 Winter Classic, the NHL opted to distribute the Road to the NHL Winter Classic series to its broadcast partners. In addition, each episode was made available on NHL.com and the league's social media pages.

From 2010 to 2020, episodes of the series were produced by Ross Greenburg in conjunction with the NHL. Beginning in 2021, NHL Studios will oversee production of the series, with Steve Mayer as executive producer, and Jay Nelson and Steve Stern as producers.

For the 2022 edition, the Road to the Winter Classic was aired as a five or eight-minute segment on the NHL on TNT postgame show as opposed to a standalone episode during the Greenburg era. Unlike previous seasons, the season finale did not include highlights of the Winter Classic itself. Each episode was made available on the Bleacher Report YouTube page.

The Road to the Winter Classic series did not return for the 2023 edition though in 2024, the NHL resumed producing four half-hour episodes of the series but without the highlights from the game itself. The series was produced by Radan Films and NHL Productions.

== Impact ==
Its popularity in the United States led to the American Hockey League adopting a similar contest in 2010, the AHL Outdoor Classic, which it continued to organize each season through 2017–18. Both the Winter Classic and the earlier Cold War contest helped repopularize outdoor hockey at the college and university level, and several college organizations and minor and junior hockey leagues hold outdoor games each year. The Winter Classic also led to the revival of the Heritage Classic, an outdoor game featuring only Canadian NHL teams, as well as the creation of the NHL Stadium Series, another regular season event that is held at an outdoor venue.

== See also ==
- NHL Stadium Series
- NHL Heritage Classic
- List of outdoor ice hockey games
- List of ice hockey games with highest attendance
- MLB at Field of Dreams
