= 2026 NHL Winter Classic =

Outdoor hockey game in Miami

| | 1 | 2 | 3 | Total |
|---|---|---|---|---|
| New York Rangers | 2 | 1 | 2 | 5 |
| Florida Panthers | 0 | 0 | 1 | 1 |
- Date: January 2, 2026
- Venue: LoanDepot Park
- City: Miami
- Attendance: 36,153

The 2026 NHL Winter Classic was an outdoor regular season National Hockey League (NHL) game, part of the Winter Classic series. The game was played on January 2, 2026, with the New York Rangers defeating the defending Stanley Cup champion Florida Panthers at LoanDepot Park in Miami. The Rangers won the game 5–1, with Mika Zibanejad scoring the first hat trick in Winter Classic history, and the first in an outdoor game since the 2020 Stadium Series.

== Background ==
The league announced the game on January 8, 2025, alongside the 2026 NHL Stadium Series. The games will be the first outdoor NHL games played in the state of Florida, as the Stadium Series will be held at Raymond James Stadium in Tampa. The game was the Florida Panthers' first game in Miami since 1998, the southernmost game in NHL history, and the Panthers' first-ever outdoor game, which will leave the Utah Mammoth as the only team to have not played in an outdoor game. The Rangers were chosen as the opponent in hopes of drawing a large traveling fanbase to the event (as there are many New Yorkers who live in South Florida), which continues to be a solid in-person draw for the league, while the defending champion Panthers' hosting of the event ensures a quality opponent, addressing complaints about the 2025 event in which the then-last place Chicago Blackhawks hosted.

This is the second consecutive year the league has attempted to schedule the Winter Classic on a day that is not its traditional New Year's Day time slot. As part of a gentlemen's agreement between TNT and ESPN, who share American rights to the NHL and the College Football Playoff, TNT moved the Winter Classic out of the windows used by the Playoff quarterfinals, which now occupy all of New Year's Day afternoon and evening as well as prime time New Year's Eve. The previous season's attempt to move the Winter Classic to December 31 before the first quarterfinal game was unsuccessful due to a number of factors, among them viewers being unable to watch the game due to being at work on a non-holiday, viewers being unaware the game had been moved off New Year's Day, and competition from non-Playoff bowl games; for 2026, the league will attempt to schedule it on the day after New Year's Day, which poses many of the same issues.

Due to Miami's warm climate, the NHL modified its construction of the rink for the game so that the ice sheets are 2½ inches thick, 1 inch higher than a standard NHL rink. They also used two mobile refrigeration units instead of one. The retractable roof of LoanDepot Park remained closed for the duration of the construction to maintain optimal ice conditions. The NHL planned to have the roof open at puck drop, though there was also a contingency plan to close the roof in the event outdoor temperatures rise. Early reports had stated that the league would use a special concrete-and-steel, climate-controlled dome placed over the playing surface during construction, then removed at game time; said device eventually was never used, as the league eventually deemed that keeping the retractable roof closed and using air conditioning provided a cool enough environment to construct the rink. The opening puck drop was scheduled for 8:25 pm, allowing the environment to cool. League officials set a target of 65 °F (18 °C) for opening the roof; the temperature was 61 °F (16 °C) at puck drop.

== Game summary ==
| January 2, 2026 | New York Rangers | 5–1 | Florida Panthers | LoanDepot Park | Recap |

Scoring summary
| Period | Team | Goal | Assist(s) | Time | Score |
|---|---|---|---|---|---|
| 1st | NYR | Mika Zibanejad (13) – pp | Alexis Lafreniere (13) and Artemi Panarin (28) | 15:09 | 1–0 NYR |
| 1st | NYR | Artemi Panarin (15) | Mika Zibanejad (19) and Alexis Lafreniere (14) | 16:13 | 2–0 NYR |
| 2nd | NYR | Mika Zibanejad (14) | Alexis Lafreniere (15) and Vincent Trocheck (14) | 00:58 | 3–0 NYR |
| 3rd | FLA | Sam Reinhart (23) – pp | Sam Bennett (17) and Brad Marchand (23) | 02:20 | 3–1 NYR |
| 3rd | NYR | Artemi Panarin (16) – pp | Vincent Trocheck (15) and Mika Zibanejad (20) | 12:25 | 4–1 NYR |
| 3rd | NYR | Mika Zibanejad (15) – sh – en | Alexis Lafreniere (15) and Vincent Trocheck (14) | 18:32 | 5–1 NYR |
Penalty summary
| Period | Team | Player | Penalty | Time | PIM |
| 1st | NYR | Taylor Raddysh | Hooking | 02:40 | 2:00 |
| 1st | NYR | Vincent Trocheck | Delay of game (puck over glass) | 11:04 | 2:00 |
| 1st | FLA | Jack Studnicka | Delay of game (puck over glass) | 14:29 | 2:00 |
| 1st | FLA | Aaron Ekblad | Illegal check to head | 18:52 | 2:00 |
| 2nd | NYR | Vladislav Gavrikov | Hooking | 02:25 | 2:00 |
| 3rd | NYR | Jonny Brodzinski | Tripping | 01:39 | 2:00 |
| 3rd | NYR | Matthew Robertson | Delay of game | 08:09 | 2:00 |
| 3rd | FLA | Uvis Balinskis | Hooking | 11:21 | 2:00 |
| 3rd | NYR | Carson Soucy | Interference | 16:38 | 2:00 |

Shots by period
| Team | 1 | 2 | 3 | Total |
|---|---|---|---|---|
| New York | 6 | 6 | 8 | 20 |
| Florida | 10 | 15 | 12 | 37 |

Power play opportunities
| Team | Goals/Opportunities |
|---|---|
| New York | 2/3 |
| Florida | 1/6 |

Three star selections
| | Team | Player | Statistics |
|---|---|---|---|
| 1st | NYR | Mika Zibanejad | 3 goals, 2 assists |
| 2nd | NYR | Artemi Panarin | 2 goals, 1 assist |
| 3rd | FLA | Sam Reinhart | 1 goal |

== Entertainment ==
Singer-songwriter Role Model performed at the NHL Winter Classic Fan Festival and during the first intermission with Panthers players Aleksander Barkov and Matthew Tkachuk as the "Sally". Latin singer Luis Fonsi performed during the player introductions. Florida National Guard Sgt. Emily Nichols sang the national anthem accompanied by American Sign Language performer Joshua Rodriguez. Also during the opening ceremonies, the NHL unveiled the Rangers and Panthers playing in the 2026 Winter Olympics. The ceremonial puck drop was done by Panthers alumni player Roberto Luongo who is the only player in Panthers history to have a number retired.

== Broadcasting ==
In the United States, broadcasting rights to the game are held by TNT, with sister channel TruTV simulcasting, and streaming on HBO Max. In Canada, rights are held by Sportsnet with streaming on Sportsnet+; it is the last Winter Classic to be covered under the NHL's current English Canadian broadcast contract with Rogers Media, which expires in 2026.

=== Ratings ===
The Winter Classic averaged one million viewers across all American platforms, an ostensible increase that would break the downward trend in the game's viewership. The game peaked at 1.3 million viewers at the end of the first period before declining to 826,000 by the game's end. The apparent increase was caused by a change in methodology; viewership in fact declined 11% compared to the previous Winter Classic when measured by the methodology in place when that game was played.
