= 2017 NHL Winter Classic =

Outdoor National Hockey League game in St. Louis, Missouri

	1	2	3	Total
Chicago Blackhawks	1	0	0	1
St. Louis Blues	0	1	3	4
- Date: January 2, 2017
- Venue: Busch Stadium
- City: St. Louis
- Attendance: 46,556

The 2017 NHL Winter Classic (officially the 2017 Bridgestone NHL Winter Classic) was an outdoor ice hockey game played in the National Hockey League (NHL) on January 2, 2017, at Busch Stadium in St. Louis, Missouri. The ninth edition of the Winter Classic, it matched the St. Louis Blues against the Chicago Blackhawks; the Blues won, 4−1. The game was announced on March 9, 2016, after news of the matchup had been leaked on February 7 before the details had been finalized, and was one of four outdoor regular season games during the 2016–17 NHL season.

== Background ==
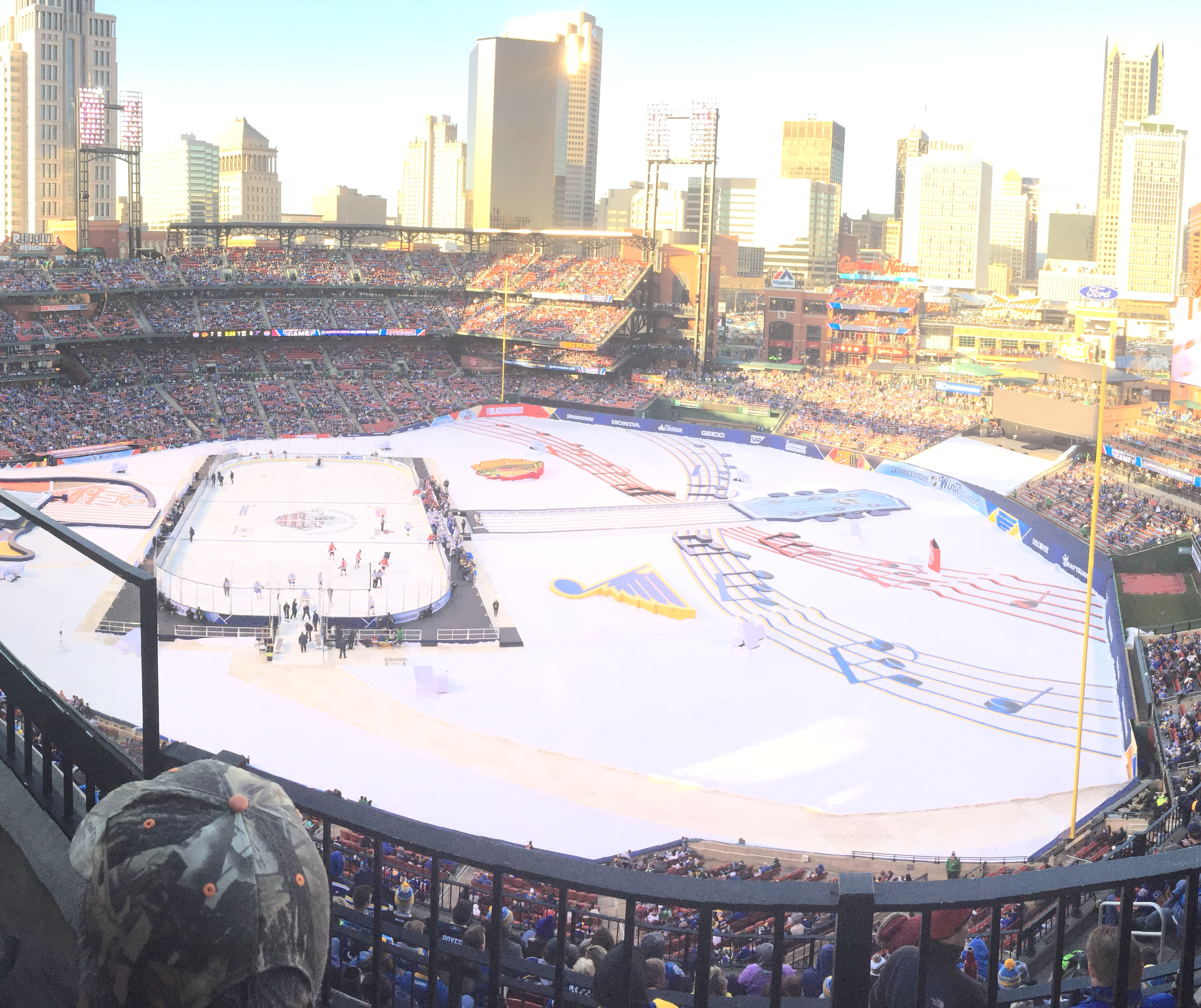
Busch Stadium hosts the 2017 Alumni game 2 days prior to the Winter Classic. December 31, 2016

St. Louis had expressed interest in an outdoor game as early as 2011, with this matchup being their first.

The Blackhawks played in their third Winter Classic, following appearances in 2009 and 2015; with the appearance, the Blackhawks will have appeared in the contest more times than any other team. It is also the fourth consecutive year (and fifth overall) in which the Blackhawks play an outdoor game, having also played the 2014 and 2016 Stadium Series in addition to the 2015 and 2017 Winter Classics.

This matchup was of the storied Blackhawks–Blues rivalry, both members of the NHL's Central Division. The game was held in St. Louis to mark the 50th anniversary of the Great Expansion of 1967, in which the Blues, Pittsburgh Penguins, Philadelphia Flyers, Los Angeles Kings, Minnesota North Stars (which became the Dallas Stars in 1993) and California Golden Seals (who merged with the North Stars in 1978; the San Jose Sharks were then spun off from the North Stars in 1991) were formed, doubling the league's size. The Flyers and Penguins were another candidate for the 2017 Winter Classic, but scheduling conflicts with the National Football League in both cities and winterization concerns regarding Beaver Stadium (a neutral site stadium discussed as another possibility for a Flyers–Penguins outdoor contest) led St. Louis to be chosen instead. St. Louis has no NFL or major college team, and even when it did, the Rams (who left in January 2016 for Los Angeles) played in an indoor dome; Busch Stadium, a baseball venue, is the city's only sufficiently sized outdoor stadium. The Penguins and Flyers will instead play a Stadium Series game in Pittsburgh later in 2017.

The league considered having BMO Field and the Toronto Maple Leafs host the 2017 Winter Classic against the New York Rangers, but the 2016 Winter Classic, which featured the Montreal Canadiens, received the lowest U.S. ratings in the game's history. Jon Miller, president of NBC Sports programming, credited the poor ratings to multiple factors, including several bowl games involving teams from markets that are popularly associated with hockey, not being held at a sufficiently iconic venue, and most prominently, the presence of a Canadian team. Miller argued that having all-U.S. matchups in the Winter Classic helps to guarantee local viewership that counts towards NBC's ratings.

The NHL ultimately announced on March 9, 2016 that there would be two outdoor games during the New Year's weekend. First, as January 1, 2017 fell on a Sunday, the NHL followed the precedent of the 2012 Winter Classic and college football bowl games by scheduling the 2017 Winter Classic for Monday, January 2, instead of its customary New Year's Day scheduling. The league then announced an outdoor game would be played on New Year's Day in Toronto, known as the Centennial Classic—a re-match of the 2014 Winter Classic between the Toronto Maple Leafs and the Detroit Red Wings. It would be held at BMO Field to commemorate the centennial season of the Maple Leafs, and the beginning of the NHL's centennial year.

== Game summary ==
January 2, 2017	Chicago Blackhawks	1-4	St. Louis Blues	Busch Stadium	Recap

The St. Louis Blues won 4–1 behind goalie Jake Allen's 22 saves, and with star Vladimir Tarasenko scoring two goals in the third period turning a 1–1 tie into a 3–1 lead. An empty-net goal provided the 4–1 final score. Michal Kempny had the Chicago Blackhawks' only goal.

Scoring summary
Period	Team	Goal	Assist(s)	Time	Score
1st	CHI	Michal Kempny (2)	Artemi Panarin (24) and Duncan Keith (35)	01:02	CHI 1–0
2nd	STL	Patrik Berglund (6)	Jay Bouwmeester (7) and Alexander Steen (16)	07:45	1–1
3rd	STL	Vladimir Tarasenko (17)	Robby Fabbri (13)	12:05	STL 2–1
3rd	STL	Vladimir Tarasenko (18)	Jori Lehtera (7) and Robby Fabbri (14)	13:58	STL 3–1
3rd	STL	Alexander Steen (4) – en	Unassisted	18:46	STL 4–1

Number in parentheses represents the player's total in goals or assists to that point of the season

Penalty summary
Period	Team	Player	Penalty	Time	PIM
1st	STL	Alex Pietrangelo	Slashing	10:24	2:00
1st	CHI	Brian Campbell	Delay of game (puck over glass)	17:40	2:00
2nd	CHI	Artemi Panarin	Holding the stick	04:29	2:00
2nd	STL	Robby Fabbri	Boarding	10:31	2:00
2nd	CHI	Ryan Hartman	Interference	19:14	2:00
3rd	CHI	Ryan Hartman	Slashing	04:54	2:00
3rd	STL	Ryan Reaves	Interference	09:33	2:00

Shots by period
Team	1	2	3	Total
Chicago	6	11	6	23
St. Louis	8	15	12	35

Power play opportunities
Team	Goals/Opportunities
Chicago	0/3
St. Louis	0/4

Three star selections
	Team	Player	Statistics
1st	STL	Vladimir Tarasenko	2 goals
2nd	STL	Jake Allen	22 saves
3rd	CHI	Duncan Keith	1 assist

== Television ==
In the United States, the game was broadcast by NBC. In Canada, the game was broadcast in English on Sportsnet, and in French by TVA Sports. Sportsnet simulcast NBC's feed while TVA used NBC's video.

Epix would produce a documentary series, Road to the NHL Outdoor Classics, focusing on preparations for both the Winter Classic and NHL Centennial Classic. Unlike previous years, where NBC was able to share resources with other rightsholders at the Winter Classic, NBC was the only rightsholder with a production presence at the game. St. Louis native and NBC Sports anchor Bob Costas contributed to pre-game coverage.

An average of 2.557 million viewers watched the U.S. broadcast, making it the tenth highest-rated regular season broadcast on NBC, but the lowest-rated Winter Classic overall, continuing a years-long decline in viewership for the event.

== Alumni Game ==
The alumni game was played on Saturday, December 31, 2016, with the Blues defeating the Blackhawks 8-7.

=== Alumni rosters ===
Chicago Blackhawks
Coaches: Tony Esposito and Cliff Koroll

#		Player	Position
5	(Canada)	Steve Konroyd	D
5	(United States)	Jack O'Callahan	D
5	(Canada)	Brent Sopel	D
8	(Canada)	Steve Poapst	D
10	(Canada)	Reg Kerr	LW
10	(United States)	Brian Noonan	RW
13	(Canada)	Daniel Carcillo	LW
15	(United States)	Jim Cummins	RW
19	(Canada)	Kyle Calder	LW
19	(Canada)	Troy Murray	C
22	(Canada)	Jamal Mayers	RW
22	(Canada)	Grant Mulvey	RW
26	(Canada)	David Mackey	LW
29	(Canada)	Jimmy Waite	G
30	(Canada)	Murray Bannerman	G
33	(Canada)	Adrian Aucoin	D
33	(Canada)	Reid Simpson	LW
37	(United States)	Adam Burish	RW
40	(Canada)	Darren Pang	G
55	(Canada)	Eric Daze	LW
55	(Canada)	Ben Eager	LW

St. Louis Blues
Coaches: Red Berenson, Bob Plager, Brian Sutter and Garry Unger

#		Player	Position
1	(Canada)	Mike Liut	G
2	(Canada)	Al MacInnis	D
4	(Canada)	Bruce Affleck	D
5	(Canada)	Garth Butcher	D
5	(Canada)	Barret Jackman	D
6	(Canada)	Larry Patey	C
6	(Canada)	Jamie Rivers	D
7	(United States)	Keith Tkachuk	LW
10	(Canada)	Dallas Drake	RW
12	(Canada)	Adam Oates	C
14	(Canada)	Paul Cavallini	D
16	(Canada)	Brett Hull	RW
17	(Canada)	Gino Cavallini	LW
19	(Canada)	Scott Mellanby	RW
21	(Canada)	Jeff Brown	D
24	(Canada)	Bernie Federko	C
26	(Canada)	Paul Stastny	C
27	(Canada)	Bryce Salvador	D
27	(Canada)	Terry Yake	C
30	(Canada)	Martin Brodeur	G
31	(Canada)	Ed Staniowski	G
39	(Canada)	Kelly Chase	RW
44	(Canada)	Chris Pronger	D
48	(United States)	Scott Young	RW
50	(Canada)	Chris Mason	G
77	(Canada)	Pierre Turgeon	C
99	(Canada)	Wayne Gretzky	C

== Pregame/Anthem/Entertainment ==
Much of the branding around the game was themed around music, playing off both the Blues' nickname as well as St. Louis' musical heritage. As such the game featured several live performances by artists who were born in or around St. Louis.

Prior to the game, hip-hop artist Nelly performed in front of the crowd.

The national anthem was performed by trumpeter Spencer Ludwig. The ceremonial puck drop was done by Bobby Hull and Brett Hull, both wearing the jerseys of the club where they played many of their games (Chicago for Bobby, St. Louis for his son).

During the first intermission, Nathanial Rateliff & The Nightsweats performed. During the second intermission, Blues anthem singer Charles Glenn performed with his band, The Charles Glenn Band, accompanied by the Central Baptist Church choir and the McCluer North High School choir. The songs that they performed were "God Bless America", "Ride, Sally, Ride", and "When the Blues Go Marching In".

Blues organist, Jeremy Boyer, entertained and pumped up fans throughout the game on the Busch Stadium organ. Boyer also plays organ for the St. Louis Cardinals and has played organ for both the Blues and Cardinals at Busch Stadium.
