= 2016 NHL Winter Classic =

Outdoor National Hockey League game in Foxborough, Massachusetts

	1	2	3	Total
Montreal Canadiens	1	2	2	5
Boston Bruins	0	0	1	1
- Date: January 1, 2016
- Venue: Gillette Stadium
- City: Foxborough
- Attendance: 67,246

The 2016 NHL Winter Classic (officially the 2016 Bridgestone NHL Winter Classic) was an outdoor ice hockey game played in the National Hockey League (NHL) on January 1, 2016, at Gillette Stadium in Foxborough, Massachusetts. The eighth edition of the Winter Classic, it matched the Montreal Canadiens against the Boston Bruins; the Canadiens won, 5–1, a significant event in one of the NHL's best-known rivalries. A Bruins and Canadiens alumni game was also played on December 31, 2015. The Boston Pride women's professional hockey team played before the alumni game against Les Canadiennes of the Canadian Women's Hockey League to a 1–1 tie in the first 2016 Outdoor Women's Classic (officially the Outdoor Women's Classic presented by Scotiabank).

== Teams ==
The Bruins made their second appearance in the Winter Classic, as they played against the Philadelphia Flyers in the 2010 NHL Winter Classic held in Boston's Fenway Park; Massachusetts became the first market to serve as repeat host of the Winter Classic. Early reports dating back to December 2014 by TSN's Bob McKenzie indicated that Boston was the league's first choice in hosting the game.

To accommodate the event, Gillette Stadium's primary tenant, the New England Patriots, played the last two games of their 2015 season on the road. The Bruins introduced a new third jersey for the game and it featured the team's original logo, as virtually a re-creation of their inaugural 1924–25 NHL season brown/gold sweaters worn while playing their home games in Matthews Arena, which opened in 1910, now on the campus of Northeastern University. (Matthews also was the first arena for the Boston Celtics and the WHA New England Whalers, who are now the Carolina Hurricanes.)

This was the first Winter Classic appearance and third outdoor game for the Canadiens; the team previously played 2003 NHL Heritage Classic against the hosting Edmonton Oilers and the 2011 NHL Heritage Classic against the hosting Calgary Flames. The team also played in a new third jersey and used a logo from the 1920s.

The two teams are long-time rivals. As of the end of the 2014–15 NHL season, the two teams have played each other 729 times during the regular season, 177 times during the playoffs, including nine game sevens. The two teams also held a special alumni game between the two teams, on December 31 at Gillette Stadium.

== Game summary ==
January 1, 2016	Montreal Canadiens	5–1	Boston Bruins	Gillette Stadium	Recap

In the most lopsided score in the Winter Classic, four Montreal players combined to score five goals en route to a 5–1 victory against Boston. In his first game since suffering a hand injury on November 22, Canadiens forward Brendan Gallagher recorded a goal and an assist. Goalie Mike Condon made 27 saves for Montreal. Adam McQuaid scored the Bruins' only goal; this goal was originally credited to Matt Beleskey, but would be changed days later after official review by the NHL.

Scoring summary
Period	Team	Goal	Assist(s)	Time	Score
1st	MTL	David Desharnais (8)	Dale Weise (9) and Alexei Emelin (3)	01:14	1–0 MTL
2nd	MTL	Paul Byron (6)	Brian Flynn (6) and Mark Barberio (1)	02:00	2–0 MTL
2nd	MTL	Brendan Gallagher (10)	Max Pacioretty (15) and Tomas Plekanec (21)	17:20	3–0 MTL
3rd	BOS	Matt Beleskey (1)	Adam McQuaid (17) and Jimmy Hayes (11)	03:56	3–1 MTL
3rd	MTL	Max Pacioretty (16)	Brendan Gallagher (11) and Tomas Plekanec (22)	08:49	4–1 MTL
3rd	MTL	Paul Byron (7)	P. K. Subban (26) and Nathan Beaulieu (10)	18:28	5–1 MTL

Number in parentheses represents the player's total in goals or assists to that point of the season

Penalty summary
Period	Team	Player	Penalty	Time	PIM
1st	BOS	Maxime Talbot	High-sticking	05:20	2:00
1st	MTL	David Desharnais	Roughing – double minor	08:42	4:00
1st	BOS	Torey Krug	Roughing – double minor	08:42	4:00
1st	BOS	Adam McQuaid	Delay of game (puck over glass)	18:27	2:00
2nd	BOS	Kevan Miller	Cross-checking	02:51	2:00
2nd	MTL	Lars Eller	Hooking	06:43	2:00
2nd	MTL	Nathan Beaulieu	Holding	10:41	2:00
2nd	MTL	Tomas Plekanec	Delay of game (puck over glass)	19:30	2:00
3rd	BOS	Maxime Talbot	Holding	09:24	2:00
3rd	MTL	Lars Eller	Roughing – double minor	18:18	4:00
3rd	BOS	Jimmy Hayes	Roughing – double minor	18:18	2:00

Shots by period
Team	1	2	3	Total
Montreal	14	11	5	30
Boston	3	14	11	28

Power play opportunities
Team	Goals/Opportunities
Montreal	0/4
Boston	0/3

Three star selections
	Team	Player	Statistics
1st	MTL	Brendan Gallagher	1 Goal, 1 Assist
2nd	MTL	Mike Condon	27 Saves
3rd	BOS	Matt Beleskey	5 Hits, +1

== Team rosters ==
Montreal Canadiens
#		Player	Position
11	(Canada)	Brendan Gallagher	RW
14	(Czech Republic)	Tomas Plekanec (A)	C
15	(Czech Republic)	Tomas Fleischmann	LW
17	(Canada)	Torrey Mitchell	C
22	(Canada)	Dale Weise	RW
26	(United States)	Jeff Petry	D
27	(United States)	Alex Galchenyuk	C
28	(Canada)	Nathan Beaulieu	D
32	(United States)	Brian Flynn	C
39	(United States)	Mike Condon	G
40	(Canada)	Ben Scrivens	G
41	(Canada)	Paul Byron	LW
43	(Canada)	Daniel Carr	LW
45	(Canada)	Mark Barberio	D
51	(Canada)	David Desharnais	C
67	(United States)	Max Pacioretty (C)	LW
74	(Russia)	Alexei Emelin	D
76	(Canada)	P.K. Subban (A)	D
79	(Russia)	Andrei Markov	D
81	(Denmark)	Lars Eller	C
Head coach: (Canada) Michel Therrien

Boston Bruins
#		Player	Position
11	(United States)	Jimmy Hayes	RW
14	(Canada)	Brett Connolly	RW
21	(Sweden)	Loui Eriksson (A)	LW
25	(Canada)	Maxime Talbot	C
29	(Canada)	Landon Ferraro	C
33	(Slovakia)	Zdeno Chara (C)	D
36	(Canada)	Zac Rinaldo	C
37	(Canada)	Patrice Bergeron (A)	C
39	(Canada)	Matt Beleskey	LW
40	(Finland)	Tuukka Rask	G
44	(Germany)	Dennis Seidenberg	D
45	(Canada)	Joe Morrow	D
47	(United States)	Torey Krug	D
50	(Sweden)	Jonas Gustavsson	G
51	(Canada)	Ryan Spooner	C
53	(Canada)	Seth Griffith	C
54	(Canada)	Adam McQuaid	D
72	(United States)	Frank Vatrano	C
76	(Russia)	Alexander Khokhlachev	C
86	(United States)	Kevan Miller	D
Head coach: (Canada) Claude Julien

Ben Scrivens and Jonas Gustavsson dressed as the back-up goaltenders. Neither entered the game.

=== Scratches ===
- Montreal Canadiens: Greg Pateryn, Devante Smith-Pelly, Jarred Tinordi
- Boston Bruins: Zach Trotman, Brad Marchand, Tyler Randell

== Alumni Game ==
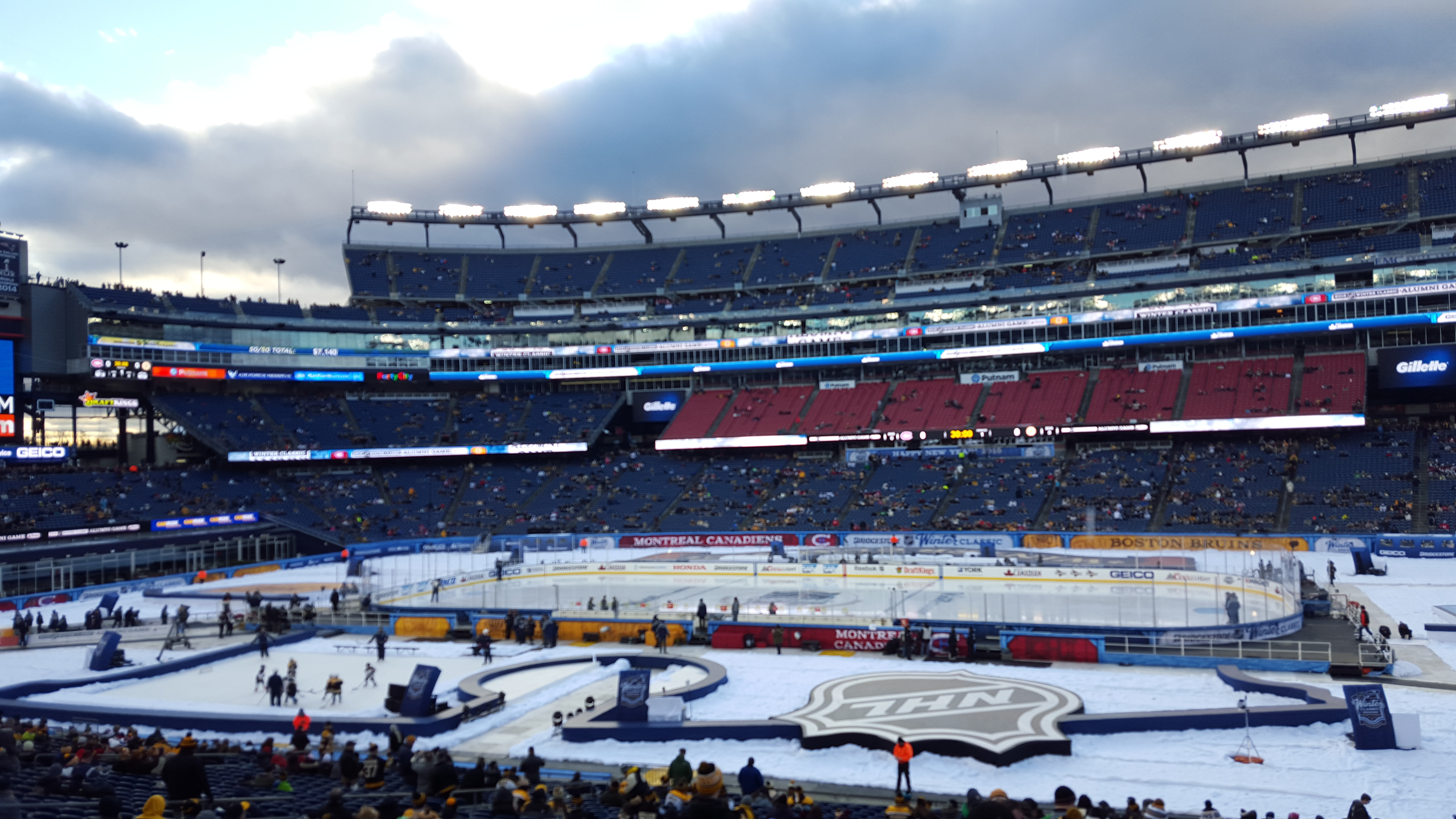
Stadium during Alumni Game

In the Alumni Game on New Year's Eve, the Bruins defeated the Canadiens 5–4 in a shootout. The Canadiens alumni included Guy Carbonneau, Larry Robinson and Jose Theodore with the coaches including Guy Lafleur and Jacques Demers, while the Bruins alumni included Cam Neely, Terry O'Reilly, Mark Recchi and Ray Bourque with the coaches including Derek Sanderson, Lyndon Byers, Mike Milbury and Don "Grapes" Cherry.

Bruins' former anthem singer Rene Rancourt performed O Canada and The Star-Spangled Banner at the alumni game.

== Television ==
The game was televised in the United States on NBC, with commentators Mike Emrick, Eddie Olczyk, and Pierre McGuire.

In Canada, it was the second consecutive Winter Classic to be televised under the Rogers Media contract, but for the first time the English-language broadcast was shown on Sportsnet instead of on CBC Television and the Hockey Night in Canada banner. Commentary was provided by Jim Hughson, Craig Simpson, and Glenn Healy. For the second consecutive time, the game was broadcast in French on TVA Sports (with commentators Félix Séguin and Patrick Lalime, and reporter Renaud Lavoie) as part of TVA's sub-licensing agreement with Rogers.

== Television ratings ==
The 2016 NHL Winter Classic had the lowest ratings of any Winter Classic in the United States to date, with an average of less than 3 million American viewers watching the game.

=== Pregame entertainment ===
Prior to the game, Boston-based pop rock band American Authors performed.

The Boston Pops performed "Duel of the Fates" during the team introductions.

The national anthems were performed by Montreal-based rock band Simple Plan ("O Canada" sung in English and French) and The Voice season 9 winner Jordan Smith, accompanied by the Boston Pops ("The Star-Spangled Banner").

Singer-songwriter Nate Ruess performed during the first intermission while Simple Plan performed during the second intermission.
