= 2008 NHL Winter Classic =

Outdoor National Hockey League game in Orchard Park, New York

Coordinates: 42.774°N 78.787°W

	1	2	3	OT	SO	Total
Pittsburgh Penguins	1	0	0	0	1 (2/3)	2
Buffalo Sabres	0	1	0	0	0 (1/3)	1
- Date: January 1, 2008
- Venue: Ralph Wilson Stadium
- City: Orchard Park
- Attendance: 71,217

Location in the United States
Location in New York

The 2008 NHL Winter Classic (known via corporate sponsorship as the AMP Energy NHL Winter Classic) was an outdoor ice hockey game played in the National Hockey League (NHL) on January 1, 2008, at Ralph Wilson Stadium near Buffalo, New York. It was the league's inaugural Winter Classic game, and was contested between the Pittsburgh Penguins and Buffalo Sabres; the Penguins won, 2–1, in a shootout on a goal by captain Sidney Crosby. The event was the NHL's second outdoor regular season game (following the 2003 Heritage Classic in Edmonton, Alberta, Canada), and the first outdoor regular season professional ice hockey game to be played in the United States. Due to the snowy conditions, the game was at the time colloquially referred to as the "Ice Bowl" by residents of the area and Sabres' fans. The event was sponsored by AMP Energy, and was televised in the United States on NBC and in Canada on CBC and RDS.

The game, which was played at a temporary ice rink built on the football field, set an NHL attendance record of 71,217. The Sabres held a Winter Classic "house party" at HSBC Arena (now KeyBank Center) during the game where another 11,000 fans saw the game shown live on the arena's video scoreboard with synched-up audio from the team's radio coverage. The Buffalo Sabres Alumni Hockey Team played a pre-game at the HSBC Arena as part of the house party festivities. Buffalo Sabres anthem singer Doug Allen sang the Canadian national anthem, as is customary at Sabres home games. Irish tenor Ronan Tynan performed "God Bless America" before the game at the stadium.

The success of the event has led to subsequent outdoor hockey games being scheduled and helped establish the Winter Classic as an annual NHL tradition.

== Preparations ==
Construction of the outdoor rink began on December 24, the day after the Buffalo Bills played their last home game of the 2007 NFL season. It was built between the 16-yard lines of the football field, under the supervision of NHL facilities operations manager Dan Craig. Crew members first removed the goal posts and laid down large tarps over the field to protect it from the weather. Initially, six inches (150 mm) of the nine-inch (230 mm) crown of the football field had to be leveled using styrofoam insulation. On top of the newly created flat surface, three inches (75 mm) of plywood with plastic covering were laid as a base for the necessary piping. At the same time the boards were being put in place, an inch of sand was spread amongst the piping and was then wet by a combination of hoses and timely rain so it could freeze into a rink overnight and be painted four days before the game. Another ¾ of an inch of ice was added to complete the playing surface. Due to the inclement weather and lack of a rink system, Craig later stated that the fact that they were able to succeed was remarkable. The NHL had created a backup plan in case the weather became unmanageable.

After this experience, Commissioner Gary Bettman stated that the League would like more time to prepare the site for the next outdoor game. He also wanted to ensure that not too many outdoor games are held so the event can remain special. This sentiment was further echoed by hockey pundits, such as Scott Burnside.

== Attendance ==
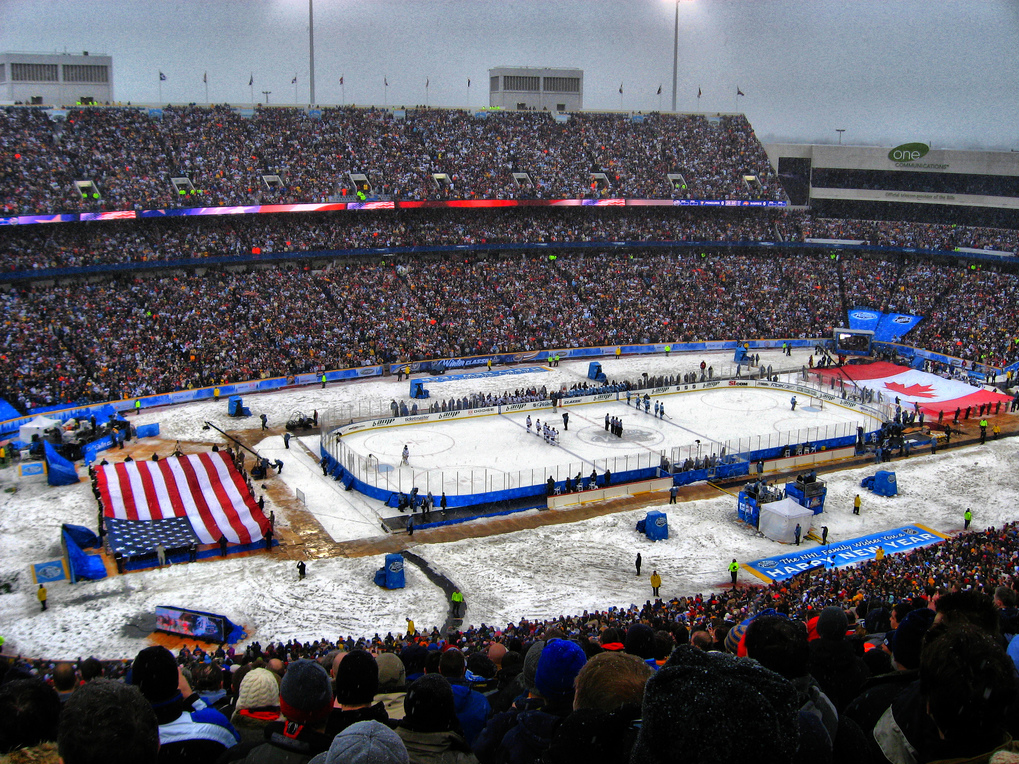
View from inside the stadium during the opening ceremony

The game was attended by 71,217 people, setting an NHL attendance record. The former NHL record of 57,167 was set at the 2003 Heritage Classic between the Montreal Canadiens and Edmonton Oilers in Edmonton, Alberta, on November 22, 2003. Georges Laraque and Ty Conklin are the only two players who have played in both the Heritage Classic and Winter Classic games. They both played for the Oilers and Penguins, respectively, for each game. While it was the record for a professional game, it fell short of the then all-time number of 74,554, which was set in "The Cold War" between the University of Michigan and Michigan State University on October 6, 2001. Sabres goaltender Ryan Miller and Penguins forward Adam Hall both played for Michigan State in that game.

Approximately 41,000 tickets to the game were made available to the general public, selling out within 30 minutes of their release on September 18, 2007. In the face of controversy about the quickness of ticket sales, an official spokesperson for the Sabres called it "a testament to how popular the Sabres are and how many people want to be part of the event." However, many Penguins fans were left out because they did not have the opportunity to purchase tickets after they became available to the city hosting the event, and they were frustrated by the lack of exclusivity for Penguins season-ticket holders. Game show host Pat Sajak attended the Winter Classic and spoke positively of his experience.

== Television and radio coverage ==
The game was televised in the United States on NBC and in Canada on CBC's Hockey Night in Canada and Le Réseau des sports. The game garnered a 2.2 rating and drew 3.75 million viewers. Nearly 7,000 seats at Ralph Wilson Stadium were obstructed due to television cameras for NBC's broadcast. NBC announcers Mike Emrick and Eddie Olczyk stood on a constructed perch by the penalty boxes. Jim Hughson and Craig Simpson also announced the game from behind the penalty boxes, with Greg Millen between the benches.

== Pregame ==
Prior to the start of the event, fans began tailgating in the parking lot as is customary at football games. Former Boston Bruins player Kraig Nienhuis attended the game and played guitar for fans in an unofficial capacity. There was also an official pregame band, and a bagpipe player led players out onto the ice.

Doug Allen sang the Canadian national anthem ("O Canada") and Irish tenor Ronan Tynan performed "God Bless America" before the game. A military flyover was conducted by four UH-60 Blackhawk helicopters. Singer-songwriter Sam Roberts performed songs from his band's album Chemical City during the second intermission.

== Rule changes ==
Due to the expected inclement weather, the NHL announced that several rule changes were in effect for this game to nullify advantages to either team due to the weather conditions. The teams switched ends halfway through the third period, and play was interrupted exactly at the 10:00 minute mark to allow the ice to be resurfaced. In the shootout, each goaltender was permitted to choose which goal to defend, and they each chose the same goal, towards the west side of the stadium. There were multiple unexpected delays during the game to scrape snow and to repair holes in the ice.

If the game had been stopped early, it would have only counted as "official" after two full periods. In that case, the team in the lead would be declared the winner and earn two points. If the score was tied when the game was stopped, both teams would get one point, and a shootout would take place right away. If weather conditions made an immediate shootout impossible, it would have been rescheduled for February 17. While both teams were aware of these format changes, the NHL didn’t share them publicly until shortly before the game.

== Game summary ==
The teams wore vintage jerseys for the event, with the Penguins wearing powder blue jerseys for the first time since 1973. The Sabres wore their old white jerseys, which they wore from 1978 to 1996. In addition to the retro jerseys, the goaltenders also wore speciality masks designed specifically for the Winter Classic. Sabres goaltender Ryan Miller added a retro Sabres logo to his mask while Ty Conklin's featured snowflakes and a Winter Classic logo. Miller also alternated between three toques, which would later be auctioned off for his charity, the " Steadfast Foundation." Penguins backup Dany Sabourin wore a set of vintage-styled pads but did not play.

Weather for the game was appropriate to the winter setting it was intended to evoke, with game-time temperatures around the freezing mark and snow falling for much of the time, especially during the third period. The weather conditions made play somewhat more difficult for players but were well received by fans.

The Penguins registered 25 shots on goal, and the Sabres had 37, dominating the second and overtime periods, leading those 14–2 and 7–0, respectively. Each goalie allowed one goal in playing time not including the shootout, giving Conklin 36 saves for the Penguins, and Miller 24 for the Sabres.

Scoring summary
Period	Team	Goal	Assist(s)	Time	Score
1st	PIT	Colby Armstrong (6)	Sidney Crosby (37)	00:21	1–0 PIT
2nd	BUF	Brian Campbell (4)	Tim Connolly (23) and Daniel Paille (11)	01:25	1–1
3rd	None				
OT	None				
Shootout	Team	Shooter	Goaltender	Result	SO Score
Shootout	BUF	Ales Kotalik	Ty Conklin	goal	1–0 BUF
Shootout	PIT	Erik Christensen	Ryan Miller	miss	1–0 BUF
Shootout	BUF	Tim Connolly	Ty Conklin	save	1–0 BUF
Shootout	PIT	Kris Letang	Ryan Miller	goal	1–1
Shootout	BUF	Maxim Afinogenov	Ty Conklin	save	1–1
Shootout	PIT	Sidney Crosby	Ryan Miller	goal	2–1 PIT

Number in parentheses represents the player's total in goals or assists to that point of the season

Penalty summary
Period	Team	Player	Penalty	Time	PIM
1st	BUF	Tim Connolly	Hooking	04:22	2:00
1st	BUF	Maxim Afinogenov	Hooking	07:16	2:00
1st	BUF	Thomas Vanek	Holding	12:17	2:00
1st	PIT	Colby Armstrong	Goaltender interference	13:02	2:00
2nd	None				
3rd	PIT	Colby Armstrong	Hooking	20:00	2:00
OT	None				

Shots by period
Team	1	2	3	OT	Total
Pittsburgh	11	2	12	0	25
Buffalo	9	14	7	7	37

Power play opportunities
Team	Goals/Opportunities
Pittsburgh	0/3
Buffalo	0/2

Three star selections
	Team	Player	Statistics
1st	PIT	Sidney Crosby	Game Winning Shootout Goal, 1 Assist
2nd	PIT	Ty Conklin	36 Saves (.973)
3rd	BUF	Ryan Miller	24 Saves (.960)

== Team rosters ==
Pittsburgh Penguins
#		Player	Position
4	(United States)	Rob Scuderi	D
5	(Canada)	Darryl Sydor (A)	D
11	(Canada)	Jordan Staal	C
12	(United States)	Ryan Malone	LW
16	(Canada)	Erik Christensen	C
17	(Czech Republic)	Petr Sykora	RW
18	(United States)	Adam Hall	LW
19	(United States)	Ryan Whitney	D
20	(Canada)	Colby Armstrong	RW
27	(Canada)	Georges Laraque	RW
30	(Canada)	Dany Sabourin	G
35	(United States)	Ty Conklin	G
37	(Finland)	Jarkko Ruutu	LW
38	(United States)	Jeff Taffe	C
44	(United States)	Brooks Orpik	D
48	(Canada)	Tyler Kennedy	RW
55	(Russia)	Sergei Gonchar (A)	D
58	(Canada)	Kris Letang	D
71	(Russia)	Evgeni Malkin	LW
87	(Canada)	Sidney Crosby (C)	C
Head coach: (Canada) Michel Therrien

Buffalo Sabres
#		Player	Position
5	(Finland)	Toni Lydman	D
6	(Czech Republic)	Jaroslav Spacek (C)	D
9	(Canada)	Derek Roy	C
10	(Sweden)	Henrik Tallinder	D
12	(Czech Republic)	Ales Kotalik	RW
19	(United States)	Tim Connolly	C
20	(Canada)	Daniel Paille	LW
22	(Canada)	Adam Mair	RW
26	(Austria)	Thomas Vanek	LW
28	(United States)	Paul Gaustad	C
29	(United States)	Jason Pominville (A)	RW
30	(United States)	Ryan Miller	G
35	(Canada)	Jocelyn Thibault	G
37	(United States)	Michael Ryan	C
38	(Canada)	Nathan Paetsch	D
45	(Russia)	Dmitri Kalinin	D
51	(Canada)	Brian Campbell	D
55	(Germany)	Jochen Hecht (A)	LW
61	(Russia)	Maxim Afinogenov	RW
76	(Canada)	Andrew Peters	LW
Head coach: (Canada) Lindy Ruff

Jocelyn Thibault dressed for the Buffalo Sabres as the back-up goalie and did not enter the game.
Dany Sabourin dressed for the Pittsburgh Penguins as the back-up goalie and did not enter the game.

=== Scratches ===
- Pittsburgh Penguins: #10 Gary Roberts (injured)
- Buffalo Sabres: #4 Nolan Pratt (healthy), #21 Drew Stafford (concussion)

=== Officials ===
- Referees — Marc Joannette, Don VanMassenhoven
- Linesmen — Brad Kovachik, Tim Nowak

== Future games ==
Due to the success of the Winter Classic and its predecessor, outdoor games have been held during subsequent seasons, and the Winter Classic has become an annual NHL tradition. The next Winter Classic was held on January 1, 2009, at Wrigley Field in Chicago, matching the Detroit Red Wings against the Chicago Blackhawks. Winter Classics have been held in every year since, except for 2013, which was interrupted by the 2012–2013 NHL lockout. The NHL Heritage Classic, which began in 2003, have had six Heritage Classics since the Winter Classic. The league expanded its offerings of outdoor games with the introduction of the NHL Stadium Series in 2014. Since the inaugural Winter Classic, the NHL has held 34 additional outdoor games, which includes the Winter Classic, the Stadium Series, and the Heritage Classic, as well as one-off events like the Centennial Classic, NHL 100 Classic and NHL Outdoors at Lake Tahoe games.

== See also ==
- 2007–08 Buffalo Sabres season
- 2007–08 Pittsburgh Penguins season
- List of outdoor ice hockey games
- List of ice hockey games with highest attendance
