= 2010 NHL Winter Classic =

Outdoor National Hockey League game in Boston, Massachusetts

	1	2	3	OT	Total
Philadelphia Flyers	0	1	0	0	1
Boston Bruins	0	0	1	1	2
- Date: January 1, 2010
- Venue: Fenway Park
- City: Boston
- Attendance: 38,112

The 2010 NHL Winter Classic (known via corporate sponsorship as the 2010 NHL Winter Classic presented by Bridgestone) was an outdoor ice hockey game played in the National Hockey League (NHL) on January 1, 2010, at Fenway Park in Boston, Massachusetts. The third edition of the Winter Classic, it matched the Boston Bruins (the home team) against the Philadelphia Flyers. The Bruins won the game, 2–1, in overtime. With the victory, the Bruins became the first home team to win a Winter Classic. After the game, the roster of the United States men's hockey team for the 2010 Winter Olympics was released, which included Bruins' goaltender Tim Thomas.

The New York Rangers had previously also been considered as an opponent for the Bruins. The game was telecast on NBC in the United States; in Canada, CBC televised the game in English, and RDS held the French language rights, while ESPN America televised the contest in Europe. Radio rights nationally were held by Sirius XM Radio, while WBZ-FM in Boston and WIP in Philadelphia used their local announcers. Additionally, there was pre-and-post game coverage on the NHL Network in the USA and Canada. The game garnered a 2.6 national rating and 3.7 million viewers, down slightly from the 2009 Classic. In Boston, the game captured a 14.4 rating and a 29 share.

Since there was no NHL All-Star Game in the 2009–10 season due to the 2010 Winter Olympics, which were held in Vancouver, in February, the Winter Classic served as the league's biggest showcase game of the season. The NHL was in negotiations with the Calgary Flames to host a second outdoor game on New Year's Day at McMahon Stadium, likely against another Canadian opponent. That game was instead played in February 2011.

== Site selection ==
Early reports indicated six possible venues for the 2010 game: the Las Vegas Strip, Yankee Stadium, the Rose Bowl, either Nationals Park or Robert F. Kennedy Stadium in Washington, D.C., Comerica Park in Detroit and Fenway Park. The Rose Bowl stadium was eliminated as they host the Rose Bowl Game and the 2010 BCS National Championship Game. NHL Commissioner Gary Bettman visited Yankee Stadium on February 12, 2009, to take a tour of the new facility with New York Yankees owner George Steinbrenner and New York mayor Michael Bloomberg, where the trio discussed the possibility of having the game in the Bronx.

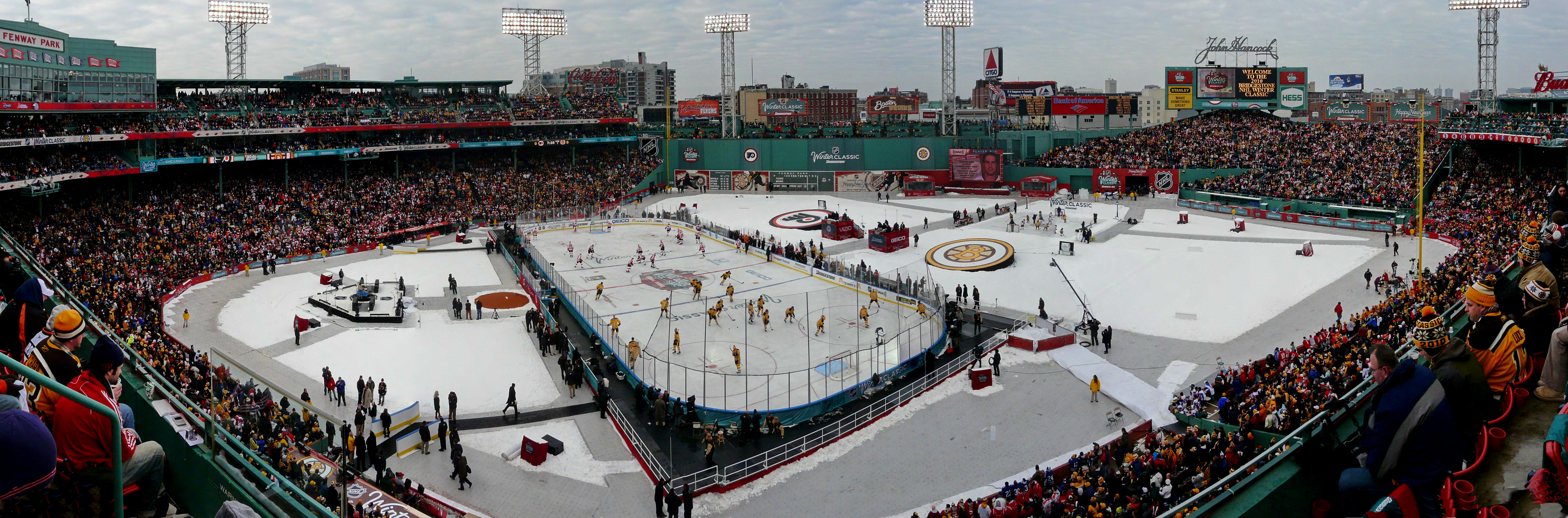
Panorama of the park prior to the game

== Uniforms ==
For this game, the Flyers wore a reverse of their current home uniform, a white replica of their 1973–74 home jersey, but with a black nameplate with white lettering. The Bruins wore a uniform designed by former great Cam Neely in dark yellow with brown pants with dark yellow socks with brown and white striping and a different "B" in their famous "Hub" logo introduced in 1948–49 on their 1955–57 uniforms; brown and gold were the Bruins' colors when they entered the NHL for its 1924–25 regular season. Both jerseys are on Reebok's NHL Edge Uniform template.

== Pre-game ==
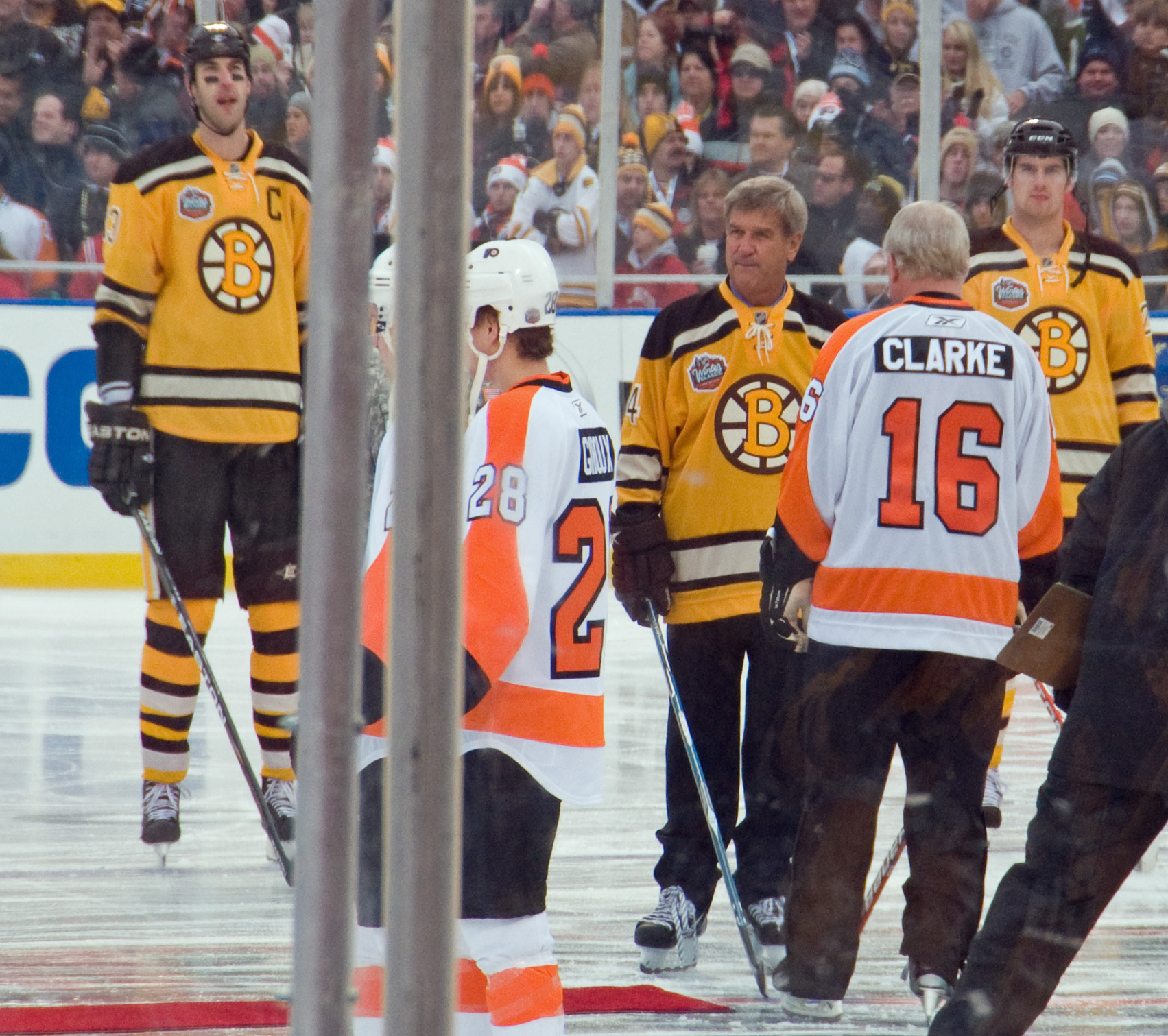
Bobby Orr and Bobby Clarke get set for the ceremonial faceoff

The ceremonial faceoff was conducted between Hall of Fame members representing the respective teams: Bobby Orr for Boston and Philadelphia's Bobby Clarke. The national anthems were performed by Daniel Powter ("O Canada") and James Taylor ("The Star-Spangled Banner").

Pre-game entertainment was provided by a marching band dressed in colonial-era attire, followed by Boston-based Celtic punk band Dropkick Murphys, who performed their song "I'm Shipping Up to Boston".

== Game summary ==
Jan 1, 2010	Philadelphia Flyers	1–2	OT	Boston Bruins	Fenway Park	Recap

During the scoreless first period, the first fight in a Winter Classic occurred as Shawn Thornton and Daniel Carcillo engaged each other, with Carcillo getting the takedown. At 4:42 in the second period, Danny Syvret scored his first career NHL goal with a shot from the blueline as the distracted Bruins goaltender Tim Thomas shoved Philadelphia's Scott Hartnell from his front. Over the course of the game, especially toward the end of each period, the ice became noticeably choppy, resulting in several odd man rushes. After Kimmo Timonen took a tripping penalty on Zdeno Chara, the Bruins tied the game on the powerplay with Mark Recchi tipping in a Derek Morris slap-pass with 2:18 left in the game. During overtime, Bruins goaltender Tim Thomas made a flurry of huge saves to keep the Bruins in the game, including stopping a 2 on 1 against Daniel Briere and Mike Richards. On the Bruins' following counter-attack up the ice, Marco Sturm tipped a Patrice Bergeron pass past Flyers goaltender Michael Leighton to win the game.

Scoring summary
Period	Team	Goal	Assist(s)	Time	Score
1st	None				
2nd	PHI	Danny Syvret (1)	Scott Hartnell (16) and Jeff Carter (19)	04:42	1–0 PHI
3rd	BOS	Mark Recchi (8)	Derek Morris (15) and David Krejci (13)	17:42	1–1
OT	BOS	Marco Sturm (14)	Patrice Bergeron (20) and Zdeno Chara (22)	01:57	2–1 BOS

Number in parentheses represents the player's total in goals or assists to that point of the season

Penalty summary
Period	Team	Player	Penalty	Time	PIM
1st	BOS	Shawn Thornton	Fighting – major	12:01	5:00
1st	PHI	Daniel Carcillo	Fighting – major	12:01	5:00
1st	PHI	Oskars Bartulis	Cross-checking	15:22	2:00
1st	BOS	David Krejci	Cross-checking	15:22	2:00
2nd	BOS	Zdeno Chara	Tripping	10:16	2:00
3rd	BOS	Johnny Boychuk	Hooking	01:30	2:00
3rd	PHI	Daniel Carcillo	Hooking	4:45	2:00
3rd	PHI	Kimmo Timonen	Tripping	16:08	2:00
3rd	PHI	Daniel Briere	Tripping	19:14	2:00
Overtime	None				

Shots by period
Team	1	2	3	OT	Total
Philadelphia	6	12	5	2	25
Boston	9	6	9	2	26

Power play opportunities
Team	Goals/Opportunities
Philadelphia	0/2
Boston	1/3

Three star selections
	Team	Player	Statistics
1st	BOS	Marco Sturm	Game Winning Goal
2nd	PHI	Michael Leighton	24 Saves (.923)
3rd	BOS	Tim Thomas	24 Saves (.960)

== Team rosters ==
Philadelphia Flyers
#		Player	Position
3	(Latvia)	Oskars Bartulis	D
5	(Canada)	Braydon Coburn	D
11	(Canada)	Blair Betts	C
12	(Canada)	Simon Gagne	LW
13	(Canada)	Daniel Carcillo	LW
14	(Canada)	Ian Laperriere	RW
17	(Canada)	Jeff Carter (A)	C
18	(Canada)	Mike Richards (C)	C
19	(Canada)	Scott Hartnell	LW
20	(Canada)	Chris Pronger (A)	D
21	(United States)	James van Riemsdyk	LW
25	(United States)	Matt Carle	D
26	(Canada)	Danny Syvret	D
28	(Canada)	Claude Giroux	RW
33	(United States)	Brian Boucher	G
36	(Canada)	Darroll Powe	C
44	(Finland)	Kimmo Timonen	D
45	(Canada)	Arron Asham	RW
48	(Canada)	Daniel Briere	RW
49	(Canada)	Michael Leighton	G
Head coach: (United States) Peter Laviolette

Boston Bruins
#		Player	Position
6	(Canada)	Dennis Wideman	D
16	(Germany)	Marco Sturm	LW
20	(Canada)	Daniel Paille	LW
21	(Canada)	Andrew Ference	D
22	(Canada)	Shawn Thornton	LW
26	(United States)	Blake Wheeler	RW
27	(Canada)	Steve Begin	LW
28	(Canada)	Mark Recchi	RW
30	(United States)	Tim Thomas	G
33	(Slovakia)	Zdeno Chara (C)	D
37	(Canada)	Patrice Bergeron (A)	C
40	(Finland)	Tuukka Rask	G
46	(Czech Republic)	David Krejci	C
48	(United States)	Matt Hunwick	D
53	(Canada)	Derek Morris	D
55	(Canada)	Johnny Boychuk	D
60	(Czech Republic)	Vladimir Sobotka	C
61	(Canada)	Byron Bitz	RW
73	(Canada)	Michael Ryder	RW
91	(Canada)	Marc Savard (A)	C
Head coach: (Canada) Claude Julien

Tuukka Rask dressed for the Boston Bruins as the back-up goalie and did not enter the game.
Brian Boucher dressed for the Philadelphia Flyers as the back-up goalie and did not enter the game.

=== Scratches ===
- Philadelphia Flyers: Riley Cote, Ryan Parent, Mika Pyorala
- Boston Bruins: Adam McQuaid

=== Officials ===
- Referees — Kerry Fraser, Chris Rooney
- Linesmen — Lyle Seitz, Brian Murphy

== Aftermath ==
Four months later, the Flyers and Bruins would meet in the second round of the Stanley Cup playoffs, marking the second-straight year that the two teams that faced each other in the Winter Classic met in the postseason. The Flyers defeated the Bruins in dramatic fashion rallying from a 3–0 deficit to win the series, becoming the third team in NHL history and the fourth in the history of North American professional sports to accomplish this feat. The previous three teams to do so were the Toronto Maple Leafs in 1942, the New York Islanders in 1975, and the Boston Red Sox in 2004. The Flyers also won the final game of the series after being down 3-0. The series win advanced the Flyers to the Eastern Conference Finals. There, they defeated the Montreal Canadiens, advancing to the Stanley Cup Finals, which was won by the Chicago Blackhawks in six games. The following year, the Bruins and Flyers again met in the playoffs’ second round. The Bruins won the series in four games. In the next round, the Bruins defeated the Tampa Bay Lightning to advance to the Stanley Cup Finals, which they won in seven games over the Vancouver Canucks.

== See also ==
- 2009–10 Boston Bruins season
- 2009–10 Philadelphia Flyers season
- List of outdoor ice hockey games
- List of ice hockey games with highest attendance
