= List of National Hockey League arenas =

Newest arenas in the NHL

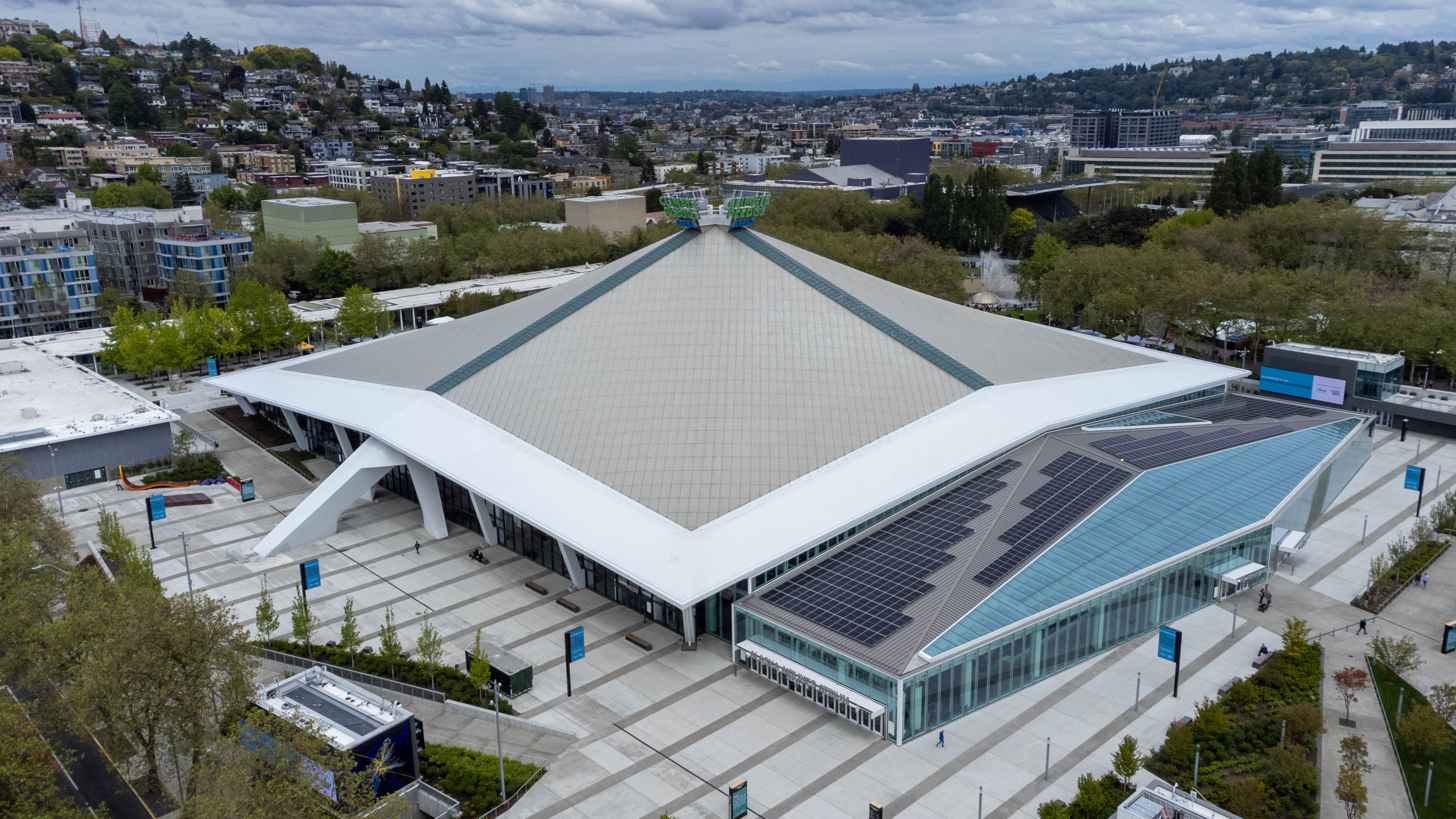
Climate Pledge Arena, opened in 2021. Although the building reuses the original roof of the Seattle Center Coliseum from 1962, it underwent a reconstruction before becoming the home of the Seattle Kraken for their debut in 2021.

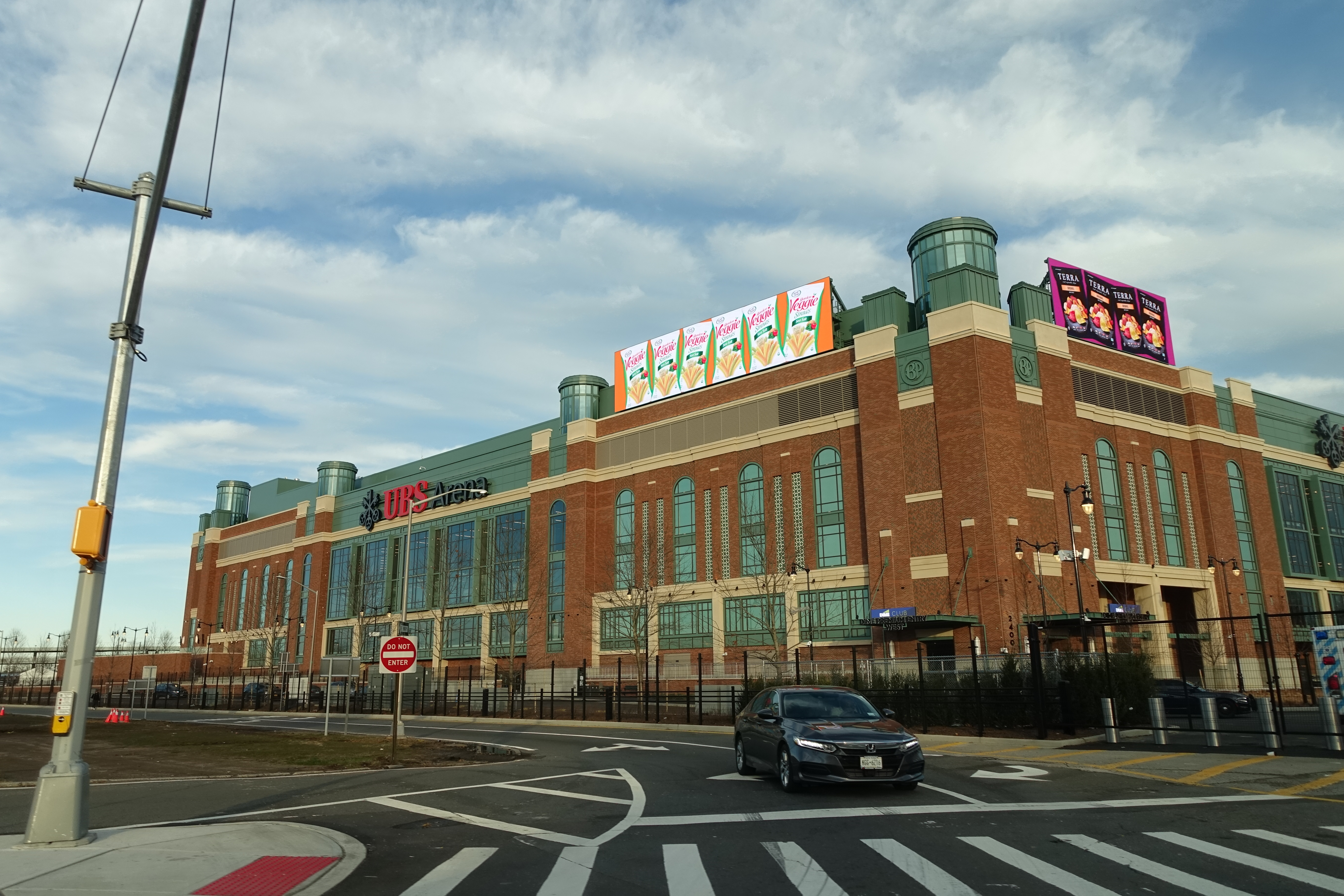
UBS Arena, opened in 2021. It is the home of the New York Islanders.

The following is a list of National Hockey League (NHL) arenas. This list includes past, present, and future arenas.

Madison Square Garden is the only current arena whose name is not held by a corporate sponsor. Climate Pledge Arena's name is corporately held by Amazon, which uses its naming rights contract to promote its climate change awareness initiative.

== Current arenas ==
Image	Arena	Location	Team	Capacity	Opened	Season of first NHL game	Ref(s)
	Amerant Bank Arena	Sunrise, Florida	Florida Panthers	19,250	1998	1998–99	
	American Airlines Center	Dallas, Texas	Dallas Stars	18,532	2001	2001–02	
	Ball Arena	Denver, Colorado	Colorado Avalanche	17,809	1999	1999–2000	
	Bell Centre	Montreal, Quebec	Montreal Canadiens	20,962	1996	1995–96	
	Benchmark International Arena	Tampa, Florida	Tampa Bay Lightning	19,092	1996	1996–97	
	Bridgestone Arena	Nashville, Tennessee	Nashville Predators	17,159	1996	1998–99	
	Canada Life Centre	Winnipeg, Manitoba	Winnipeg Jets	15,321	2004	2011–12	
	Canadian Tire Centre	Ottawa, Ontario	Ottawa Senators	19,347	1996	1995–96	
	Capital One Arena	Washington, D.C.	Washington Capitals	18,573	1997	1997–98	
	Climate Pledge Arena	Seattle, Washington	Seattle Kraken	17,151	2021^{§}	2021–22	
	Crypto.com Arena	Los Angeles, California	Los Angeles Kings	18,230	1999	1999–2000	
	Delta Center	Salt Lake City, Utah	Utah Mammoth	16,020	1991	2024–25	
	Enterprise Center	St. Louis, Missouri	St. Louis Blues	18,096	1994	1994–95	
	Grand Casino Arena	Saint Paul, Minnesota	Minnesota Wild	17,954	2000	2000–01	
	Honda Center	Anaheim, California	Anaheim Ducks	17,174	1993	1993–94	
	KeyBank Center	Buffalo, New York	Buffalo Sabres	19,070	1996	1996–97	
	Lenovo Center	Raleigh, North Carolina	Carolina Hurricanes	18,547	1999	1999–2000	
	Little Caesars Arena	Detroit, Michigan	Detroit Red Wings	19,515	2017	2017–18	
	Madison Square Garden	New York City, New York	New York Rangers	18,006	1968^{†}	1967–68	
	Nationwide Arena	Columbus, Ohio	Columbus Blue Jackets	18,144	2000	2000–01	
	PPG Paints Arena	Pittsburgh, Pennsylvania	Pittsburgh Penguins	18,387	2010	2010–11	
	Prudential Center	Newark, New Jersey	New Jersey Devils	16,514	2007	2007–08	
	Rogers Arena	Vancouver, British Columbia	Vancouver Canucks	18,910	1995	1995–96	
	Rogers Place	Edmonton, Alberta	Edmonton Oilers	18,347	2016	2016–17	
	SAP Center	San Jose, California	San Jose Sharks	17,435	1993	1993–94	
	Scotiabank Arena	Toronto, Ontario	Toronto Maple Leafs	18,800	1999	1998–99	
	Scotiabank Saddledome	Calgary, Alberta	Calgary Flames	19,289	1983	1983–84	
	TD Garden	Boston, Massachusetts	Boston Bruins	17,565	1995	1995–96	
	T-Mobile Arena	Paradise, Nevada	Vegas Golden Knights	17,367	2016	2017–18	
	UBS Arena	Elmont, New York	New York Islanders	17,255	2021	2021–22	
	United Center	Chicago, Illinois	Chicago Blackhawks	19,717	1994	1994–95	
	Xfinity Mobile Arena	Philadelphia, Pennsylvania	Philadelphia Flyers	19,538	1996	1996–97	

^§ Underwent reconstruction from 2018 to 2021, resulting in a completely new arena bowl and concourses underneath the original roof of the Seattle Center Coliseum from 1962.
^† Underwent extensive renovations from 2010 to 2013, resulting in a completely new arena bowl and concourses within the original structure.

=== Map of current arenas ===
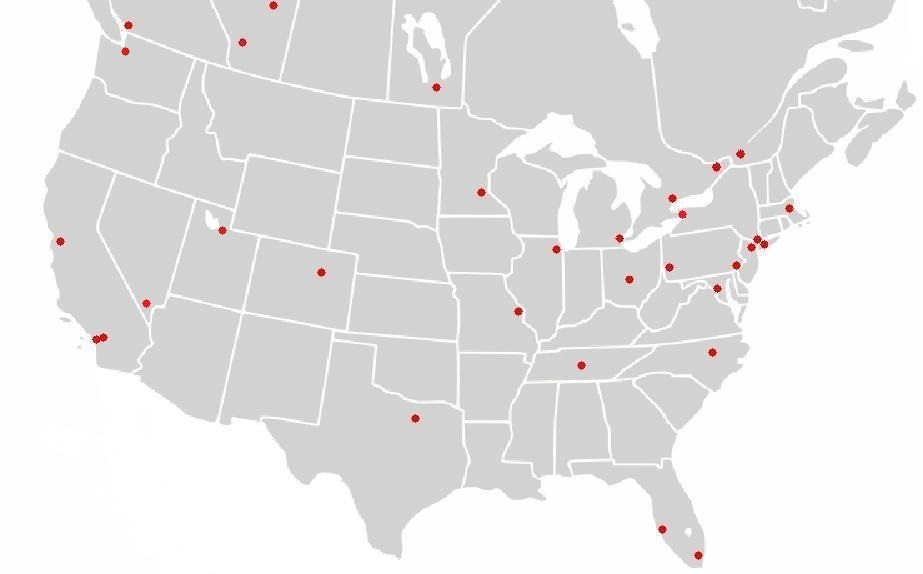

== Future and proposed arenas ==
Under construction
Arena	Team	Location	Capacity	Opening	Reference
Scotia Place	Calgary Flames	Calgary, Alberta	18,400	2027	

Proposed
Arena	Team	Location	Capacity	Opening	Reference
New South Philadelphia Arena	Philadelphia Flyers	Philadelphia, Pennsylvania	TBD	2030	
The Bend Arena	Dallas Stars	Plano, Texas	TBD	2031	
New Ottawa Arena	Ottawa Senators	Ottawa, Ontario	TBD	TBD	

== Former arenas ==
Eastern Conference
Atlantic Division
Team	Arena	Years used	Capacity	Opened	Location	Reference
Boston Bruins
Boston Bruins	Boston Garden	1928–1995	14,448	1928	Boston, Massachusetts	
Boston Bruins	Boston Arena	1924–1928	5,900	1910	Boston, Massachusetts	
Buffalo Sabres
Buffalo Sabres	Buffalo Memorial Auditorium	1970–1996	16,433	1940	Buffalo, New York	
Detroit Red Wings (Detroit Falcons) (Detroit Cougars)	Joe Louis Arena	1979–2017	20,027	1979	Detroit, Michigan	
Detroit Red Wings (Detroit Falcons) (Detroit Cougars)	Olympia Stadium	1927–1979	16,700	1927	Detroit, Michigan	
Detroit Red Wings (Detroit Falcons) (Detroit Cougars)	Border Cities Arena	1926–1927	6,000	1924	Windsor, Ontario	
Florida Panthers
Florida Panthers	Miami Arena	1993–1998	14,703	1988	Miami, Florida	
Montreal Canadiens
Montreal Canadiens	Montreal Forum	1926–1996	17,959	1924	Montreal, Quebec	
Montreal Canadiens	Mount Royal Arena	1919–1926	10,000	1919	Montreal, Quebec	
Montreal Canadiens	Jubilee Arena	1909–1911, 1918–1919	3,000	1908	Montreal, Quebec	
Montreal Canadiens	Montreal Arena	1911–1918	6,000	1898	Westmount, Quebec	
Ottawa Senators
Ottawa Senators	Ottawa Civic Centre	1992–1996	10,575	1967	Ottawa, Ontario	
Tampa Bay Lightning
Tampa Bay Lightning	Thunderdome	1993–1996	28,153	1990	St. Petersburg, Florida	
Tampa Bay Lightning	Expo Hall	1992–1993	10,425	1976	Tampa, Florida	
Toronto Maple Leafs (Toronto St. Patricks) (Toronto Arenas)
Toronto Maple Leafs (Toronto St. Patricks) (Toronto Arenas)	Maple Leaf Gardens	1931–1999	15,726	1931	Toronto, Ontario	
Toronto Maple Leafs (Toronto St. Patricks) (Toronto Arenas)	Arena Gardens	1917–1931	7,500	1912	Toronto, Ontario	
Metropolitan Division
Team	Arena	Years used	Capacity	Opened	Location	Reference
Carolina Hurricanes (Hartford Whalers) (New England Whalers)
Carolina Hurricanes (Hartford Whalers) (New England Whalers)	Greensboro Coliseum	1997–1999	21,273	1959	Greensboro, North Carolina	
Carolina Hurricanes (Hartford Whalers) (New England Whalers)	Springfield Civic Center	1978–1980	7,444	1972	Springfield, Massachusetts	
Carolina Hurricanes (Hartford Whalers) (New England Whalers)	Hartford Civic Center	1980–1997; 1975–1978	15,635	1975	Hartford, Connecticut	
Columbus Blue Jackets	None	n/a	n/a	n/a	n/a	
New Jersey Devils (Colorado Rockies) (Kansas City Scouts)
New Jersey Devils (Colorado Rockies) (Kansas City Scouts)	Brendan Byrne Arena; Continental Airlines Arena (1996–2007)	1982–2007	19,040	1981	East Rutherford, New Jersey	
New Jersey Devils (Colorado Rockies) (Kansas City Scouts)	McNichols Sports Arena	1976–1982	16,061	1975	Denver, Colorado	
New Jersey Devils (Colorado Rockies) (Kansas City Scouts)	Kemper Arena	1974–1976	16,300	1974	Kansas City, Missouri	
New York Islanders
New York Islanders	Barclays Center	2015–2020	15,795	2012	Brooklyn, New York	
New York Islanders	Nassau Coliseum	1972–2015, 2018–2021	13,917	1972	Uniondale, New York	
New York Rangers
New York Rangers	Madison Square Garden (III)	1926–1968	15,928	1925	New York City, New York	
Philadelphia Flyers
Philadelphia Flyers	The Spectrum; CoreStates Spectrum (1994–1996)	1967–1996	17,380	1967	Philadelphia, Pennsylvania	
Pittsburgh Penguins
Pittsburgh Penguins	Pittsburgh Civic Arena; Mellon Arena (1999–2010)	1967–2010	16,940	1961	Pittsburgh, Pennsylvania	
Washington Capitals
Washington Capitals	Capital Centre; USAir Arena (1993–1996); US Airways Arena (1996–1997)	1974–1997	18,130	1973	Landover, Maryland	

Western Conference
Central Division
Team	Arena	Years used	Capacity	Opened	Location	Reference
Chicago Blackhawks (Chicago Black Hawks)
Chicago Blackhawks (Chicago Black Hawks)	Chicago Stadium	1929–1994	18,472	1929	Chicago, Illinois	
Chicago Blackhawks (Chicago Black Hawks)	Chicago Coliseum	1926–1929	6,000	1899	Chicago, Illinois	
Colorado Avalanche (Quebec Nordiques)
Colorado Avalanche (Quebec Nordiques)	McNichols Sports Arena	1995–1999	16,061	1975	Denver, Colorado	
Colorado Avalanche (Quebec Nordiques)	Quebec Coliseum / Colisée de Québec	1972–1995	15,399	1950	Quebec City, Quebec	
Dallas Stars (Minnesota North Stars)
Dallas Stars (Minnesota North Stars)	Reunion Arena	1993–2001	17,001	1980	Dallas, Texas	
Dallas Stars (Minnesota North Stars)	Met Center	1967–1993	15,000	1967	Bloomington, Minnesota	
Nashville Predators	None	n/a	n/a	n/a	n/a	
Minnesota Wild	None	n/a	n/a	n/a	n/a	
St. Louis Blues
St. Louis Blues	St. Louis Arena; The Checkerdome (1977–1983)	1967–1994	17,188	1929	St. Louis, Missouri	
Utah Mammoth	None	n/a	n/a	n/a	n/a	
Winnipeg Jets (Atlanta Thrashers)
Winnipeg Jets (Atlanta Thrashers)	Philips Arena	1999–2011	18,545	1999	Atlanta, Georgia	
Winnipeg Jets (Atlanta Thrashers)	Winnipeg Arena	1979–1996	15,393	1955	Winnipeg, Manitoba	
Pacific Division
Team	Arena	Years used	Capacity	Opened	Location	Reference
Anaheim Ducks (Mighty Ducks of Anaheim)
Anaheim Ducks (Mighty Ducks of Anaheim)	None	n/a	n/a	n/a	n/a	
Calgary Flames (Atlanta Flames)
Calgary Flames (Atlanta Flames)	Stampede Corral	1980–1983	7,424	1950	Calgary, Alberta	
Calgary Flames (Atlanta Flames)	Omni Coliseum	1972–1980	15,278	1972	Atlanta, Georgia	
Edmonton Oilers (Alberta Oilers)
Edmonton Oilers (Alberta Oilers)	Northlands Coliseum; Edmonton Coliseum (1995–1998); Skyreach Centre (1998–2003); Rexall Place (2003–2016)	1974–2016	16,839	1974	Edmonton, Alberta	
Edmonton Oilers (Alberta Oilers)	Edmonton Gardens	1972–1974	7,200	1913	Edmonton, Alberta	
Los Angeles Kings
Los Angeles Kings	The Forum; Great Western Forum (1988–1999)	1967–1999	16,005	1967	Inglewood, California	
San Jose Sharks
San Jose Sharks	Cow Palace	1991–1993	11,089	1941	Daly City, California	
Seattle Kraken
Seattle Kraken	None	n/a	n/a	n/a	n/a	
Vancouver Canucks
Vancouver Canucks	Pacific Coliseum	1970–1995	16,150	1967	Vancouver, British Columbia	
Vegas Golden Knights
Vegas Golden Knights	None	n/a	n/a	n/a	n/a	

== Defunct teams ==
Team	Arena	Years used	Capacity	Opened	Location	Ref(s)
Arizona Coyotes (2014–2024) (Phoenix Coyotes) (1996–2014)	Mullett Arena	2022–2024	4,600	2022	Tempe, Arizona	
Arizona Coyotes (2014–2024) (Phoenix Coyotes) (1996–2014)	Gila River Arena; Jobing.com Arena (2006–2014); Glendale Arena (2003–2006)	2003–2022	17,125	2003	Glendale, Arizona	
Arizona Coyotes (2014–2024) (Phoenix Coyotes) (1996–2014)	America West Arena	1996–2003	16,210	1992	Phoenix, Arizona	
Brooklyn Americans (1941–1942) (New York Americans) (1925–1941)	Madison Square Garden (III)	1925–1942	15,928	1925	New York City, New York	
Cleveland Barons (1976–1978) (California Golden Seals) (1970–1976) (Oakland Seals) (1967–1970) (California Seals) (1967)	Richfield Coliseum	1976–1978	18,544	1974	Richfield, Ohio	
Cleveland Barons (1976–1978) (California Golden Seals) (1970–1976) (Oakland Seals) (1967–1970) (California Seals) (1967)	Oakland–Alameda County Coliseum Arena	1967–1976	13,601	1966	Oakland, California	
Hamilton Tigers (1920–1925) (Quebec Athletic Club) (1919–1920)	Barton Street Arena	1920–1925	4,500	1910	Hamilton, Ontario	
Hamilton Tigers (1920–1925) (Quebec Athletic Club) (1919–1920)	Quebec Arena	1919–1920	6,000	1913	Quebec City, Quebec	
Philadelphia Quakers (1930–1931) (Pittsburgh Pirates) (1925–1930)	Philadelphia Arena	1930–1931	4,000	1920	Philadelphia, Pennsylvania	
Philadelphia Quakers (1930–1931) (Pittsburgh Pirates) (1925–1930)	Duquesne Garden	1925–1930	6,500	1890	Pittsburgh, Pennsylvania	
Montreal Maroons (1924–1938)	Montreal Forum	1924–1938	17,959	1924	Montreal, Quebec	
Montreal Wanderers (1917–1918)	Montreal Arena	1917–1918	6,000	1898	Montreal, Quebec	
St. Louis Eagles (1934–1935) (Ottawa Senators) (1917–1934)	St. Louis Arena	1934–1935	20,000	1929	St. Louis, Missouri	
St. Louis Eagles (1934–1935) (Ottawa Senators) (1917–1934)	Ottawa Auditorium	1923–1934	10,000	1923	Ottawa, Ontario	
St. Louis Eagles (1934–1935) (Ottawa Senators) (1917–1934)	The Arena	1917–1923	7,000	1907	Ottawa, Ontario	

== Outdoor venues ==
The following are outdoor venues that have hosted any of the following events:

- Starting in 2003, the frequent but not annual Heritage Classic.
- Starting in 2008, the annual (except 2013 and 2021) Winter Classic.
- Starting in 2014, the annual (except 2021) Stadium Series.
- In 2017, the 100th anniversary of the NHL, the Centennial Classic and 100 Classic.
- In 2021, the NHL Outdoors at Lake Tahoe.

Host team	Venue	Event	Year used	Attendance	Location	Ref(s)
Edmonton Oilers	Commonwealth Stadium	Heritage Classic	2003	57,167	Edmonton, Alberta	Recap
Buffalo Sabres	Ralph Wilson Stadium	Winter Classic	2008	71,217	Orchard Park, New York	Recap
Chicago Blackhawks	Wrigley Field	Winter Classic	2009	40,818	Chicago, Illinois	Recap
Boston Bruins	Fenway Park	Winter Classic	2010	38,112	Boston, Massachusetts	Recap
Pittsburgh Penguins	Heinz Field	Winter Classic	2011	68,111	Pittsburgh, Pennsylvania	Recap
Calgary Flames	McMahon Stadium	Heritage Classic	2011	41,022	Calgary, Alberta	Recap
Philadelphia Flyers	Citizens Bank Park	Winter Classic	2012	46,967	Philadelphia, Pennsylvania	Recap
Detroit Red Wings	Michigan Stadium	Winter Classic	2014	105,491	Ann Arbor, Michigan	Recap
Los Angeles Kings	Dodger Stadium	Stadium Series	2014	54,099	Los Angeles, California	Recap
New Jersey Devils	Yankee Stadium	Stadium Series	2014	50,105	Bronx, New York	Recap
New York Islanders	Yankee Stadium	Stadium Series	2014	50,027	Bronx, New York	Recap
Chicago Blackhawks	Soldier Field	Stadium Series	2014	62,921	Chicago, Illinois	Recap
Vancouver Canucks	BC Place	Heritage Classic	2014	54,194	Vancouver, British Columbia	Recap
Washington Capitals	Nationals Park	Winter Classic	2015	42,832	Washington, D.C.	Recap
San Jose Sharks	Levi's Stadium	Stadium Series	2015	70,205	Santa Clara, California	Recap
Boston Bruins	Gillette Stadium	Winter Classic	2016	67,246	Foxborough, Massachusetts	Recap
Minnesota Wild	TCF Bank Stadium	Stadium Series	2016	50,426	Minneapolis, Minnesota	Recap
Colorado Avalanche	Coors Field	Stadium Series	2016	50,095	Denver, Colorado	Recap
Winnipeg Jets	Investors Group Field	Heritage Classic	2016	33,240	Winnipeg, Manitoba	Recap
Toronto Maple Leafs	BMO Field	Centennial Classic	2017	40,148	Toronto, Ontario	Recap
St. Louis Blues	Busch Stadium	Winter Classic	2017	46,556	St. Louis, Missouri	Recap
Pittsburgh Penguins	Heinz Field	Stadium Series	2017	67,318	Pittsburgh, Pennsylvania	Recap
Ottawa Senators	TD Place Stadium	100 Classic	2017	33,959	Ottawa, Ontario	Recap
Buffalo Sabres	Citi Field	Winter Classic	2018	41,821	Queens, New York	Recap
Washington Capitals	Navy–Marine Corps Memorial Stadium	Stadium Series	2018	29,516	Annapolis, Maryland	Recap
Chicago Blackhawks	Notre Dame Stadium	Winter Classic	2019	76,126	Notre Dame, Indiana	Recap
Philadelphia Flyers	Lincoln Financial Field	Stadium Series	2019	69,620	Philadelphia, Pennsylvania	Recap
Winnipeg Jets	Mosaic Stadium	Heritage Classic	2019	33,518	Regina, Saskatchewan	Recap
Dallas Stars	Cotton Bowl Stadium	Winter Classic	2020	85,630	Dallas, Texas	Recap
Colorado Avalanche	Falcon Stadium	Stadium Series	2020	43,574	Colorado Springs, Colorado	Recap
Colorado Avalanche	Edgewood Tahoe Resort	NHL Outdoors at Lake Tahoe	2021	0	Stateline, Nevada	Recap
Boston Bruins	Edgewood Tahoe Resort	NHL Outdoors at Lake Tahoe	2021	0	Stateline, Nevada	Recap
Minnesota Wild	Target Field	Winter Classic	2022	38,519	Minneapolis, Minnesota	Recap
Nashville Predators	Nissan Stadium	Stadium Series	2022	68,619	Nashville, Tennessee	Recap
Buffalo Sabres	Tim Hortons Field	Heritage Classic	2022	26,119	Hamilton, Ontario	Recap
Boston Bruins	Fenway Park	Winter Classic	2023	39,243	Boston, Massachusetts	Recap
Carolina Hurricanes	Carter–Finley Stadium	Stadium Series	2023	56,961	Raleigh, North Carolina	Recap
Edmonton Oilers	Commonwealth Stadium	Heritage Classic	2023	55,441	Edmonton, Alberta	Recap
Seattle Kraken	T-Mobile Park	Winter Classic	2024	47,313	Seattle, Washington	Recap
New Jersey Devils	MetLife Stadium	Stadium Series	2024	70,328	East Rutherford, New Jersey	Recap
New York Islanders	MetLife Stadium	Stadium Series	2024	79,690	East Rutherford, New Jersey	Recap
Chicago Blackhawks	Wrigley Field	Winter Classic	2025	40,933	Chicago, Illinois	Recap
Columbus Blue Jackets	Ohio Stadium	Stadium Series	2025	94,751	Columbus, Ohio	Recap
Florida Panthers	LoanDepot Park	Winter Classic	2026	36,153	Miami, Florida	Recap
Tampa Bay Lightning	Raymond James Stadium	Stadium Series	2026	64,617	Tampa, Florida	Recap
Winnipeg Jets	Princess Auto Stadium	Heritage Classic	2026	32,342	Winnipeg, Manitoba	Recap
Utah Mammoth	Rice–Eccles Stadium	Winter Classic	2027		Salt Lake City, Utah	
Dallas Stars	AT&T Stadium	Stadium Series	2027		Dallas, Texas	

== Neutral venues ==
The following are neutral venues that have hosted games that counted in the NHL regular season standings:

Arena	Event	Year used	Location	Ref(s)
Aréna de Québec	Game between the Ottawa Senators and Montreal Canadiens, February 27, 1918	1917–1918	Quebec City, Quebec	
Peace Bridge Arena	Various home games for the Chicago Blackhawks and Pittsburgh Pirates	1928–1929, 1929–1930	Fort Erie, Ontario	
Boardwalk Hall	Various home games for the Ottawa Senators and Pittsburgh Pirates	1929–1930	Atlantic City, New Jersey	
Olympia Stadium	Various home games for the Ottawa Senators and Chicago Blackhawks	1928–1929, 1929–1930, 1930–1931, 1933–1934	Detroit, Michigan	
Border Cities Arena	Game between the Montreal Maroons and Chicago Blackhawks, March 2, 1929	1928–1929	Windsor, Ontario	
Boston Garden	Various home games for the Ottawa Senators and Pittsburgh Pirates	1928–1929, 1929–1930	Boston, Massachusetts	
Madison Square Garden	Various home games for the Ottawa Senators and Pittsburgh Pirates	1928–1929, 1929–1930, 1930–1931	New York City, New York	
Chicago Coliseum	Various Chicago Blackhawks games when their usual home arena, Chicago Stadium, was unavailable	1929–1930, 1932–1933	Chicago, Illinois	
Arena Gardens	Various home games for the Ottawa Senators and Pittsburgh Pirates	1929–1930, 1930–1931	Toronto, Ontario	
Maple Leaf Gardens	Game between the Toronto Maple Leafs and Ottawa Senators, January 14, 1933, which was a home game for Ottawa	1929–1930, 1930–1931	Toronto, Ontario	
Indiana State Fairgrounds Coliseum; Pepsi Coliseum (1991–2012); Fairgrounds Coliseum (2014); Indiana Farmers Coliseum (2014–present)	Various home games for the Chicago Blackhawks	1952–1953, 1953–1954	Indianapolis, Indiana	
Ak-Sar-Ben Coliseum	Various home games for the Chicago Blackhawks	1953–1954, 1954–1955, 1955–1956	Omaha, Nebraska	
St. Louis Arena	Various home games for the Chicago Blackhawks	1954–1955, 1955–1956	St. Louis, Missouri	
St. Paul Auditorium	Game between the Chicago Blackhawks and Boston Bruins, February 23, 1955	1954–1955	Saint Paul, Minnesota	
Long Beach Arena	Various home games for the Los Angeles Kings	1967–1968	Long Beach, California	
Los Angeles Memorial Sports Arena	Various home games for the Los Angeles Kings	1967–1968	Los Angeles, California	
Madison Square Garden	Game between the Oakland Seals and Philadelphia Flyers, March 3, 1968	1967–1968	New York City, New York	
Maple Leaf Gardens	Game between the Boston Bruins and Philadelphia Flyers, March 7, 1968	1967–1968	Toronto, Ontario	
Colisée de Québec	Various home games for the Philadelphia Flyers	1967–1968	Quebec City, Quebec	
Cow Palace	Various home games for the Oakland Seals	1968–1969	Daly City, California	
Saskatchewan Place	Neutral site games in 1992–93 and 1993–94	1992–1993, 1993–1994	Saskatoon, Saskatchewan	
Copps Coliseum; FirstOntario Centre (2014–2024); TD Coliseum (2024–present)	Neutral site games in 1992–93 and 1993–94	1992–1993, 1993–1994	Hamilton, Ontario	
Bradley Center	Neutral site games in 1992–93	1992–1993	Milwaukee, Wisconsin	
ARCO Arena; Power Balance Pavilion (2011–2012); Sleep Train Arena (2012–2016)	Neutral site games in 1992–93 and 1993–94	1992–1993, 1993–1994	Sacramento, California	
Halifax Metro Centre; Scotiabank Centre (2014–present)	Neutral site games in 1993–94	1993–1994	Halifax, Nova Scotia	
Richfield Coliseum	Neutral site games in 1992–93 and 1993–94	1992–1993, 1993–1994	Richfield, Ohio	
America West Arena; US Airways Center (2006–2015); Talking Stick Resort Arena (2016–present)	Neutral site games in 1993–94	1993–1994	Phoenix, Arizona	
Target Center	Neutral site games in 1993–94	1993–1994	Minneapolis, Minnesota	
Orlando Arena	Neutral site games in 1993–94	1993–1994	Orlando, Florida	
Market Square Arena	Neutral site game in 1992–93	1992–1993	Indianapolis, Indiana	
Arizona Veterans Memorial Coliseum	Neutral site game in 1992–93	1992–1993	Phoenix, Arizona	
Miami Arena	Neutral site game in 1992–93	1992–1993	Miami, Florida	
Myriad Convention Center	Neutral site game in 1992–93	1992–1993	Oklahoma City, Oklahoma	
Reunion Arena	Neutral site game in 1992–93	1992–1993	Dallas, Texas	
Carver Arena	Neutral site game in 1992–93	1992–1993	Peoria, Illinois	
Omni Coliseum	Neutral site game in 1992–93	1992–1993	Atlanta, Georgia	
Riverfront Coliseum; The Crown (1997–1999); Firstar Center (1999–2002); U.S. Bank Arena (2002–present)	Neutral site game in 1992–93	1992–1993	Cincinnati, Ohio	
Providence Civic Center; Dunkin' Donuts Center (2001–present)	Neutral site game in 1992–93	1992–1993	Providence, Rhode Island	
Yoyogi Arena	1997–98 and 1998–99 season openers	1997–1998	Tokyo, Japan	
Saitama Super Arena	2000–01 season opener	2000	Saitama, Japan	
Blue Cross Arena	Various home games for the Buffalo Sabres	2003–2004, 2005–2006	Rochester, New York	

== See also ==
- List of indoor arenas in the United States
- List of European ice hockey arenas
- List of current Major League Baseball stadiums
- List of Major League Soccer stadiums
- List of National Basketball Association arenas
- List of current National Football League stadiums
