= 2026 NHL Stadium Series =

Outdoor hockey game in Tampa, Florida

	1	2	3	OT	SO	Total
Boston Bruins	3	2	0	0	0 (0/3)	5
Tampa Bay Lightning	1	3	1	0	1 (1/3)	6
- Date: February 1, 2026
- Venue: Raymond James Stadium
- City: Tampa
- Attendance: 64,617

The 2026 NHL Stadium Series was an outdoor regular season National Hockey League (NHL) game, part of the NHL Stadium Series. The game was played on February 1, 2026, with the Tampa Bay Lightning hosting the Boston Bruins at Raymond James Stadium in Tampa, Florida.

== Background ==
The league announced the game on January 8, 2025, alongside the 2026 NHL Winter Classic. It was the second outdoor NHL game to be played in Florida, following the 2026 Winter Classic in Miami.

The two open-air showcases headlined a month-long celebration of hockey in Florida, with community and grassroots events planned across the state throughout January 2026.

This was the first Stadium Series game for the Boston Bruins (though their fifth outdoor game, having previously appeared in four Winter Classics), and the second Stadium Series game for the Tampa Bay Lightning, with the first being in 2022, against the Nashville Predators. They won 3–2 at Nissan Stadium.

In the days leading up to the Stadium Series, a portable air conditioned tent was built prior to constructing a rink for the game, as Raymond James Stadium did not have a retractable roof and the Tampa Bay area is known for its mild subtropical climate during winter months, with a historic average temperature of 70 °F (21 °C) on February 1. The tent remained in place while both teams conducted practice the day before the game and was removed several hours before puck drop. Like with the Winter Classic in Miami, two refrigeration unit trucks were used throughout the game. This ended up being unnecessary due to unusually cold temperatures in Tampa, 41 °F (5 °C) at puck drop and mostly in the high 30s (2–4 °C) during the game.

== Team jerseys ==
=== Boston Bruins ===
The Bruins' jerseys featured a sunshine-gold base instead of the traditional black, reflecting the Florida setting of the outdoor game. The front replaced the usual Spoked-B with a large "Boston" wordmark and a prominent crawling bear logo, drawing inspiration from their old uniforms from the past. Subtle sun-ray textures were debossed into the sleeves and hem, while the inside collar listed the abbreviations of the six New England states to emphasize regional pride. A new varsity-style secondary "B" logo with bear claw marks appeared on the left shoulder.

=== Tampa Bay Lightning ===
The Lightning’s jerseys leaned into the city’s maritime and pirate heritage, debuting pirate-inspired elements tied to Tampa’s famous Gasparilla Pirate Festival with a new shoulder patch on the left shoulder featuring a skull-and-crossed-swords motif. They used a royal blue base combined with a new sky blue accent to reflect both the Florida setting and the Lightning’s identity. Across the front was a large "TBL" wordmark in sky blue trimmed in white, with lightning bolt designs woven through the lettering and numbers for a dynamic look. Subtle Gasparilla bead-like details were debossed into striping on the sleeves and waist, and inside the collar were beadwork references tying back to the local festival tradition.

== Game summary ==
February 1, 2026	Boston Bruins	5–6	SO	Tampa Bay Lightning	Raymond James Stadium	Recap

11 seconds into the contest, Tampa Bay's Brandon Hagel scored on the first shot of the game to record the fastest goal to start an outdoor game in NHL history, passing Colby Armstrong's goal 21 seconds into the 2008 Winter Classic. The Bruins respond with 3 unanswered goals in the first period, scored by Alex Steeves, Morgan Geekie, and Viktor Arvidsson respectively. In the second period, Boston added two more goals by Matthew Poitras and another by Geekie. Oliver Bjorkstrand scored on the power play before a goalie fight ensued between Andrei Vasilevskiy and Jeremy Swayman. After the brawl, Boston tallied 4 straight penalties, which led to 2 power play goals by Darren Raddysh and Nick Paul. In the third period, Nikita Kucherov tied the game at 5, and the game went to overtime, and ultimately, a shootout, the third for an NHL outdoor game, and first for the Stadium Series. Jake Guentzel scored the only goal of the shootout in the third round, as Tampa came back and won the game 6–5, marking the biggest comeback in outdoor game and franchise history. This game tied the record for the highest-scoring NHL outdoor game, set during the 2024 Stadium Series game between the New York Rangers and the New York Islanders.

Scoring summary
Period	Team	Goal	Assist(s)	Time	Score
1st	TBL	Brandon Hagel (26)	Nikita Kucherov (56), Darren Raddysh (33)	0:11	TBL 1–0
1st	BOS	Alex Steeves (9)	Mikey Eyssimont (9)	11:24	1–1
1st	BOS	Morgan Geekie (31)	Charlie McAvoy (33), Jonathan Aspirot (5)	15:36	BOS 2–1
1st	BOS	Viktor Arvidsson (14) – pp	Charlie McAvoy (34), Morgan Geekie (21)	18:03	BOS 3–1
2nd	BOS	Matthew Poitras (1)	Mark Kastelic (8)	2:22	BOS 4–1
2nd	BOS	Morgan Geekie (32)	David Pastrnak (48), Marat Khusnutdinov (13)	8:18	BOS 5–1
2nd	TBL	Oliver Bjorkstrand (8) – pp	Brandon Hagel (25), Jake Guentzel (32)	10:28	BOS 5–2
2nd	TBL	Darren Raddysh (16) – pp	Nikita Kucherov (57), Brandon Hagel (26)	15:50	BOS 5–3
2nd	TBL	Nick Paul (6) – pp	Jake Guentzel (33), Nikita Kucherov (58)	16:13	BOS 5–4
3rd	TBL	Nikita Kucherov (28)	Ryan McDonagh (5), Erik Cernak (6)	11:50	5–5
OT	None				
Shootout	Team	Shooter	Goaltender	Result	SO score
Shootout	TBL	Gage Goncalves	Jeremy Swayman	save	
Shootout	BOS	Casey Mittelstadt	Andrei Vasilevskiy	miss	
Shootout	TBL	Nikita Kucherov	Jeremy Swayman	miss	
Shootout	BOS	Fraser Minten	Andrei Vasilevskiy	save	
Shootout	TBL	Jake Guentzel	Jeremy Swayman	goal	1–0 TBL
Shootout	BOS	David Pastrnak	Andrei Vasilevskiy	miss	1–0 TBL

Number in parentheses represents the player's total in goals or assists to that point of the season

Penalty summary
Period	Team	Player	Penalty	Time	PIM
1st	TBL	Dominic James	High-sticking	4:57	2:00
1st	BOS	Viktor Arvidsson	Tripping	5:02	2:00
1st	TBL	Pontus Holmberg	Tripping	7:48	2:00
1st	TBL	Jake Guentzel	Tripping	16:55	2:00
2nd	BOS	Charlie McAvoy	Roughing	9:07	2:00
2nd	BOS	Mark Kastelic	Roughing	10:28	2:00
2nd	BOS	Jeremy Swayman (served by Mikey Eyssimont)	Leaving the crease	11:01	2:00
2nd	TBL	Andrei Vasilevskiy (served by Oliver Bjorkstrand)	Leaving the crease	11:01	2:00
2nd	TBL	Brandon Hagel	Slashing	11:01	2:00
2nd	BOS	Charlie McAvoy	Roughing	11:01	2:00
2nd	TBL	Andrei Vasilevskiy (served by Oliver Bjorkstrand)	Fighting – major	11:01	5:00
2nd	BOS	Jeremy Swayman (served by Oliver Bjorkstrand)	Fighting – major	11:01	5:00
2nd	BOS	Jeremy Swayman (served by Viktor Arvidsson)	Delay of game – puck over glass	14:03	2:00
2nd	BOS	Tanner Jeannot	Interference	14:16	2:00
2nd	BOS	Sean Kuraly	Closing hand on puck	15:45	2:00
3rd	None				
Overtime	BOS	David Pastrnak	Slashing	0:18	2:00
Overtime	BOS	Hampus Lindholm	Hooking	4:35	2:00

Shots by period
Team	1	2	3	OT	Total
BOS	20	9	5	0	34
TBL	8	22	7	9	46

Power play opportunities
Team	Goals/Opportunities
Boston	1 / 3
Tampa Bay	3 / 8

Three star selections
	Team	Player	Statistics
1st	TBL	Nikita Kucherov	1 goal, 3 assists
2nd	BOS	Morgan Geekie	2 goals, 1 assist
3rd	TBL	Brandon Hagel	1 goal, 2 assists

== Entertainment ==
In the first intermission, country music star Tim McGraw performed. The national anthem was performed by Hunter Hayes, accompanied by deaf performer Ivan Jarama in American Sign Language. Former Bruins and Lightning player Patrick Maroon (who also broadcasts on Lightning telecasts) presided over the ceremonial puck drop, as he was in Tampa for being the grand marshal of the 2026 Gasparilla Parade of Pirates the previous day.

== Broadcasting ==
The game aired in the United States on ESPN and was streamed on ESPN+, Disney+, and Hulu. Also, the game featured an alternate NHL in ASL presentation featuring deaf commentators providing real-time play-by-play and color commentary in ASL. In Canada, the game aired on Sportsnet in English and TVA Sports in French.
