= Justin Schultz =

Canadian ice hockey player (born 1990)

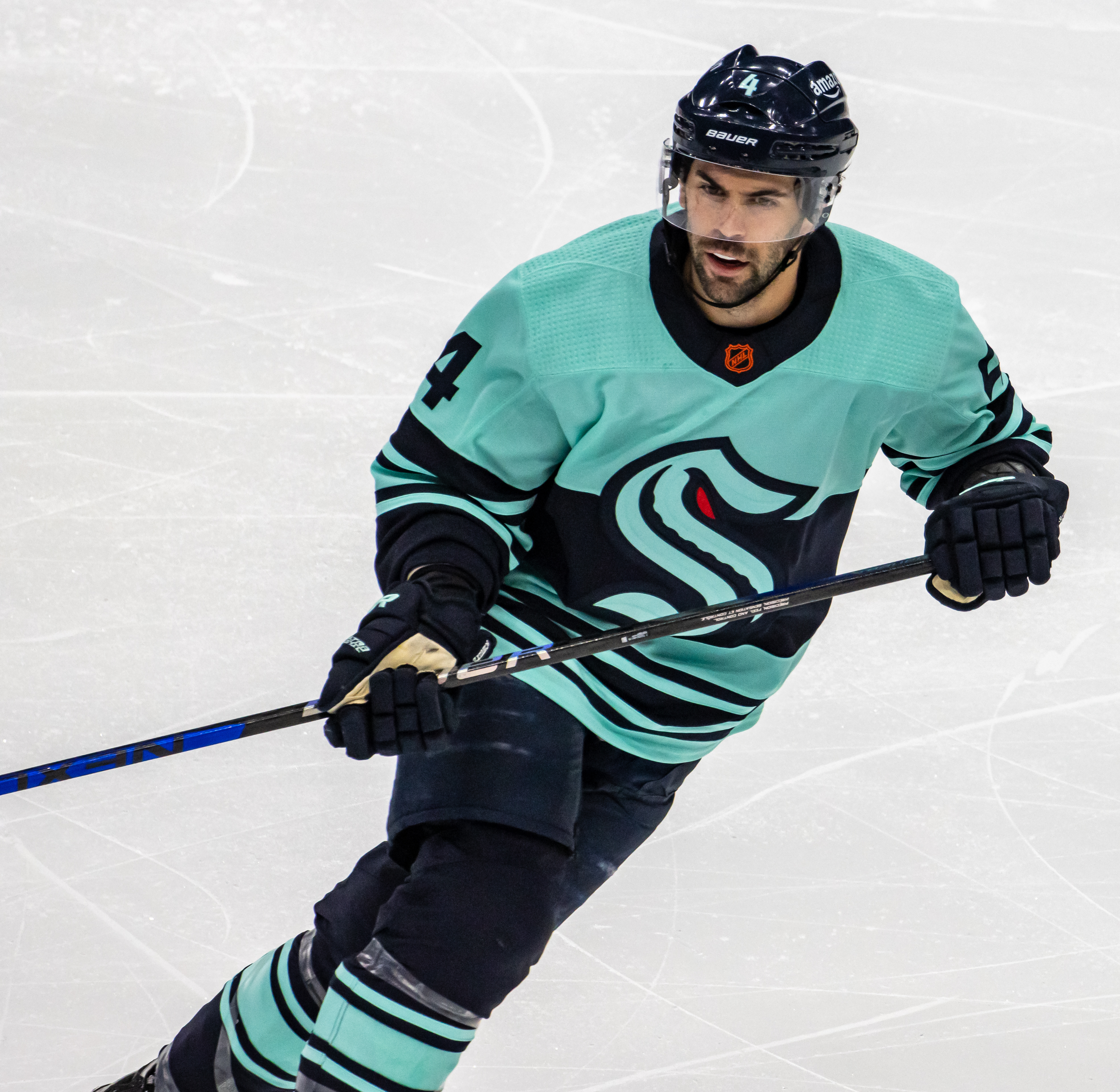
- Schultz with the Seattle Kraken in 2023
- Born: July 6, 1990 (age 36) Kelowna, British Columbia, Canada
- Height: 6 ft 2 in (188 cm)
- Weight: 190 lb (86 kg; 13 st 8 lb)
- Position: Defence
- Shot: Right
- Played for: Edmonton Oilers; Pittsburgh Penguins; Washington Capitals; Seattle Kraken; HC Lugano
- National team: Canada
- NHL draft: 43rd overall, 2008; Anaheim Ducks
- Playing career: 2012–2024

Justin Schultz (born July 6, 1990) is a Canadian former professional ice hockey player. He was a defenceman in the National Hockey League (NHL) for the Edmonton Oilers, Pittsburgh Penguins, Washington Capitals, and Seattle Kraken, as well as in the National League for HC Lugano. Following his retirement, Schultz joined the Kraken's coaching staff in a player development role.

Growing up in Kelowna, Schultz played three seasons of Junior A ice hockey with the Westside Warriors of the British Columbia Hockey League (BCHL). During his rookie season with the Warriors, he began to draw interest from hockey scouts and was named on the NHL Central Scouting Bureau's rankings. Schultz was eventually drafted 43rd overall by the Anaheim Ducks in the 2008 NHL entry draft.

Following the BCHL, Schultz played Division 1 collegiate hockey for the Wisconsin Badgers men's ice hockey team at the University of Wisconsin for three years. He had a successful collegiate career where he set numerous program records. He became the third player in WCHA history to be awarded the conference's Defensive Player of the Year award twice, as he also became the first Badger defenseman to lead a team in goal scoring.

As Schultz was unable to come to a contract agreement with the Ducks, he was heavily recruited by nearly all NHL teams following his junior year. He eventually chose to sign with the Edmonton Oilers on June 30, 2012, and remained with the organization for four seasons before being traded to the Pittsburgh Penguins in 2016. While with the Penguins, he helped the team clinch back-to-back Stanley Cup wins in 2016 and 2017. After five seasons with the Penguins, he signed with the Washington Capitals in 2020, whom he played with for two seasons before signing with the Seattle Kraken. After two seasons of play with the team, he signed on Switzerland for one season, joining HC Lugano.

== Playing career ==
=== Amateur ===
Growing up in British Columbia, Schultz played three seasons of Junior A ice hockey with the Westside Warriors of the British Columbia Hockey League (BCHL). He made his debut with the Warriors during the 2006–07 season after being called up from their midget double-A team. After scoring in his BCHL debut, Schultz returned to the Warriors full time for the 2007–08 season. Through his first full season with the Warriors, Schultz was selected to participate in the Canadian Junior Hockey League Prospects Game. He also began to draw interest from college team scouts and was named on the NHL Central Scouting Bureau's rankings. While enrolled at Mount Boucherie Senior Secondary School, Schultz committed to play Division 1 collegiate hockey for the Wisconsin Badgers men's ice hockey team at the University of Wisconsin. At the time of the commitment, he had accumulated eight goals and 26 assists through 50 games. He finished the 2007–08 regular season with nine goals and 31 assists for 40 points through 57 games and was named the conference's Top Defenseman.

Following his breakthrough rookie season, Schultz was drafted by the Anaheim Ducks of the National Hockey League (NHL) in the second round, 43rd overall, of the 2008 NHL entry draft. He subsequently participated in the Ducks' Rookie Camp before returning to the Warriors for the 2008–09 season. Upon rejoining the Warriors, Schultz was selected to represent Team West at the 2008 World Junior A Challenge with whom he won a silver medal. Upon returning to the BCHL, Schultz was selected for the B.C. Hockey League's Interior Conference All Star team. He finished his second season with the Warriors as the only BCHL defenseman to average a point per game with 25 goals and 25 assists for 50 points through 49 games. He was subsequently named the conference's Top Defenseman for the second consecutive year.

=== Collegiate ===
Schultz played collegiate hockey for the Wisconsin Badgers men's ice hockey team of the Western Collegiate Hockey Association (WCHA), for three seasons before turning professional. During his tenure with the Badgers, he played in 121 games and scored 40 goals and 73 assists. In his freshman season with the Badgers, Schultz immediately made an impact alongside defensive partner Cody Goloubef, helping the team become one of the conference's best power units. The Badgers maintained a winning record of 6–3–1 as Schultz scored his first collegiate goal on November 13, 2009, in a 6–2 win over Alaska. His play throughout the season helped lift the Badgers to the WCHA Final Five, the collective name for the quarterfinal, semifinal, and championship rounds. During this time, Schultz was named to the WCHA All-Rookie Team after he led all WCHA rookie defensemen with 16 points in league games. Schultz and the Badgers eventually faced off against Boston College in the National Championship Game, which they lost 5–0.

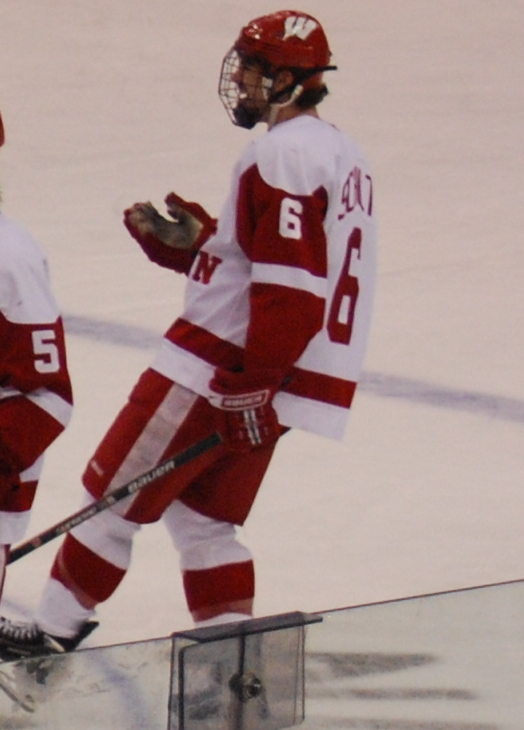
Schultz with the Wisconsin Badgers in 2010

Upon returning to Wisconsin for his sophomore season, Schultz was paired with Jake Gardiner as the team's top defensive pairing. As the Badgers began the season with a six-game winless streak, Schultz made an immediate impact on the ice by scoring a hat-trick in a 4–1 win over Michigan State in the College Hockey Showcase. He subsequently became the fifth defenseman in program history to score three goals in a game. Following the hat trick, Schultz received the WCHA defensive player of the week honour while Gardiner received the offensive player of the week honour. His two-way play helped him rank second on the team in scoring by early December and earned him praise from teammates. At the conclusion of the regular season, Schultz earned numerous recognitions for his offensive and defensive abilities. As he finished the season leading all defensemen in goals and points, Schultz became the first sophomore to be named Defensive Player of the Year in the Western Collegiate Hockey Association. He was also named to the WCHA First Team and AHCA First-Team All-American. During his end of the season review with the UW coaching staff, he reiterated his commitment to return for his junior season.

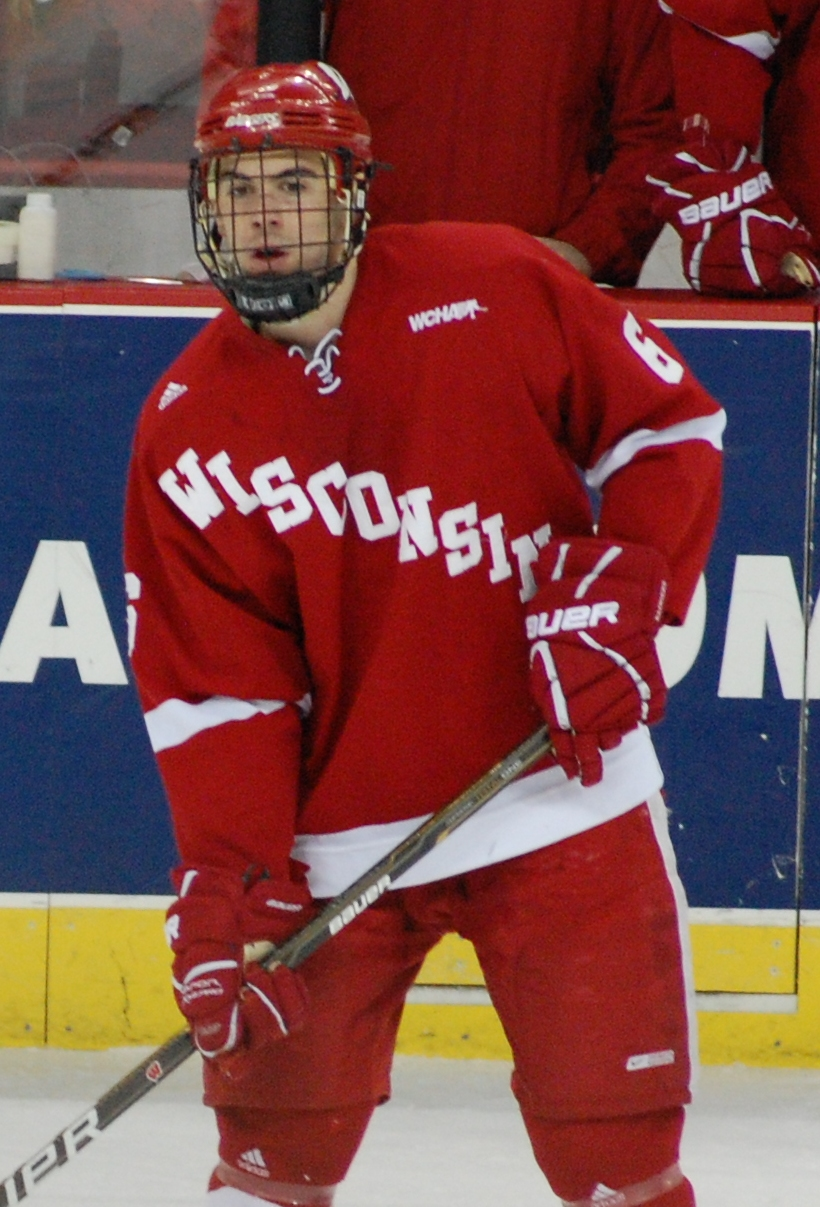
Schultz with the Wisconsin Badgers in 2011

Schultz kept his commitment and returned to the Badgers for the 2011–12 season despite confusion from hockey pundits and Anaheim Ducks staff. He later stated that he returned to UW because he did not feel prepared enough to turn professional. The Badgers squad for the 2011–12 season was the youngest under head coach Mike Eaves, as it was composed overwhelmingly of 11 sophomores and nine freshmen. Upon rejoining the team, Schultz was named an assistant captain along with junior center Ryan Little. In this new role, Schultz quickly continued his scoring prowess from the previous season as he led the team in scoring with five assists. Despite this, the Badger's powerplay struggled as they only scored 11% of the time. Schultz played the first five games of the season with Jake McCabe before the latter suffered an injury on October 21. Following the injury, Schultz found a steady defensive partner in Frankie Simonelli and they remained partners even when McCabe returned to the ice. The Badgers power play also improved as Schultz led all defensemen with nine goals and 28 points through 18 games, and ranked among the top three players in all of college hockey. By January, Schultz was in a three-way tie for the national scoring lead with 32 points as he tallied his 100th career point in a win over the RIT Tigers men's ice hockey. His offensive abilities came as he averaged 30 to 25 minutes per game and accounted for 70 percent of goals scored for the Badgers. However, as the Badgers continued their lacklustre play, he openly considered the idea of leaving before the conclusion of the season and turning professional. Schultz eventually chose to remain with the Badgers and he was soon chosen for the 2012 All-CHN First Team in March after he led all defensemen with 16 goals, 44 points, and a 1.19 points-per-game scoring average. Schultz also became the third player in WCHA history to win two WCHA Defensive Player of the Year awards. He was also named a 2012 First-Team All-WCHA defenseman and First-Team All-American. Lastly, he became the first player in program history to be named a two-time Hobey Baker Memorial Award top-10 finalist. At the team level, Schultz was recognized with the Spike Carlson Most Valuable Player Award as he became the first Badger defenseman to lead a team in goal scoring.

After withdrawing from UW following his junior season, Schultz and the Ducks were unable to come to terms on a contract within the 30-day negotiating window. As such, he became an unrestricted free agent and was heavily recruited by nearly all NHL teams. The Edmonton Oilers pushed hard to recruit Schultz, including having Wayne Gretzky and Paul Coffey personally recruit him.

=== Edmonton Oilers ===
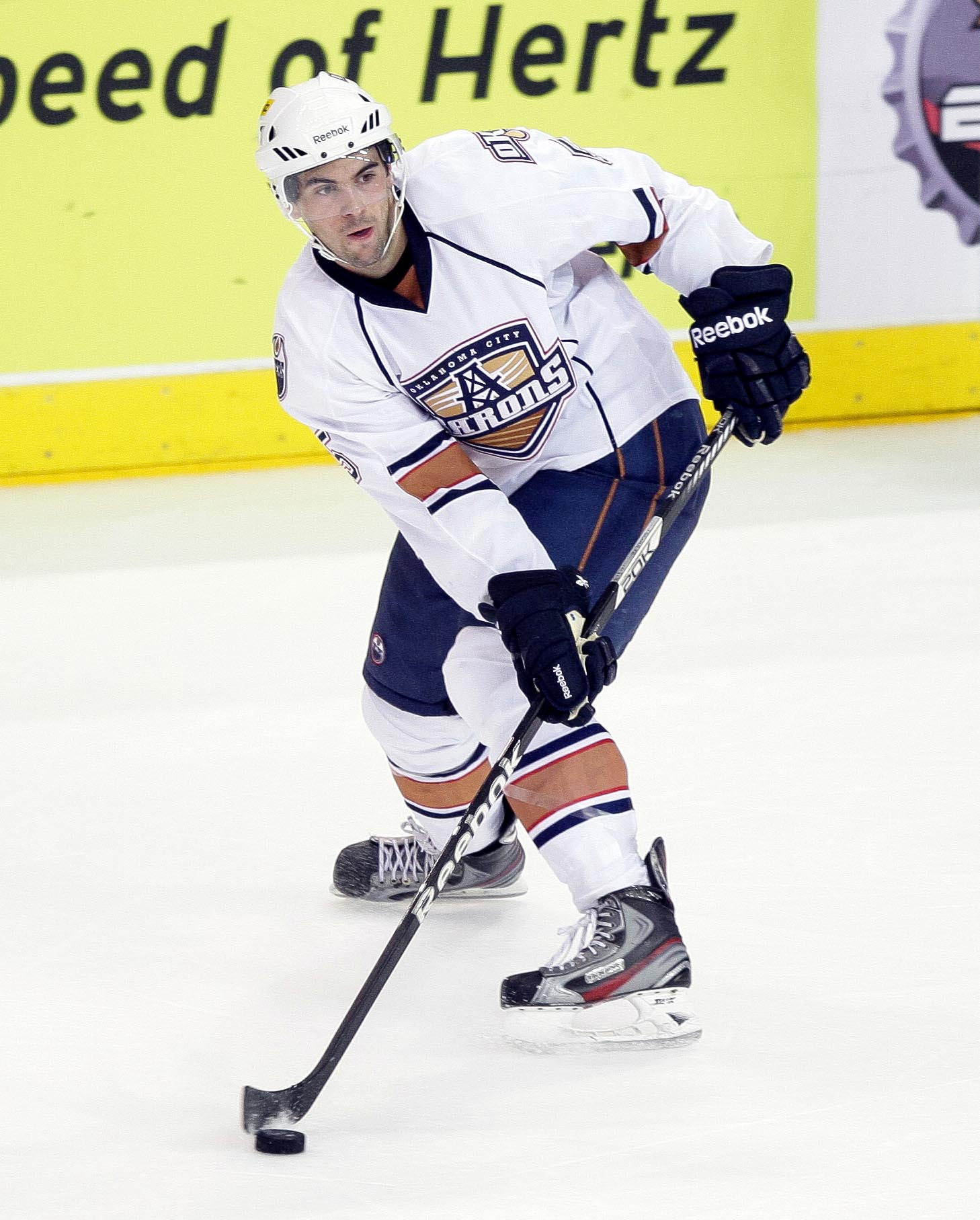
Schultz with the Oklahoma City Barons in 2012

On June 30, 2012, Schultz agreed to a two-year, entry-level contract with the Oilers worth $925,000 including a $92,500 signing bonus. Due to the 2012–13 NHL lockout that cancelled the first three months of the 2012–13 NHL season, Schultz played the first games of his professional career in the American Hockey League (AHL) for the Oilers' affiliate, the Oklahoma City Barons. He was one of the few Oilers top young players assigned to the AHL, alongside Ryan Nugent-Hopkins and Jordan Eberle. He quickly made an impact on the ice and tallied six goals and six assists for a league-leading 12 points through October. As such, he received the CCM/AHL Player of the Month award for the month of October. By late November, the Barons maintained an 11–5–1–1 record as Schultz led the team in scoring with 10 goals and 28 points through 18 games. As a result of his play, Schultz was named the CCM/AHL Rookie Of The Month for the month of November. During the month, he scored five goals and 14 assists for 19 points through 13 games.

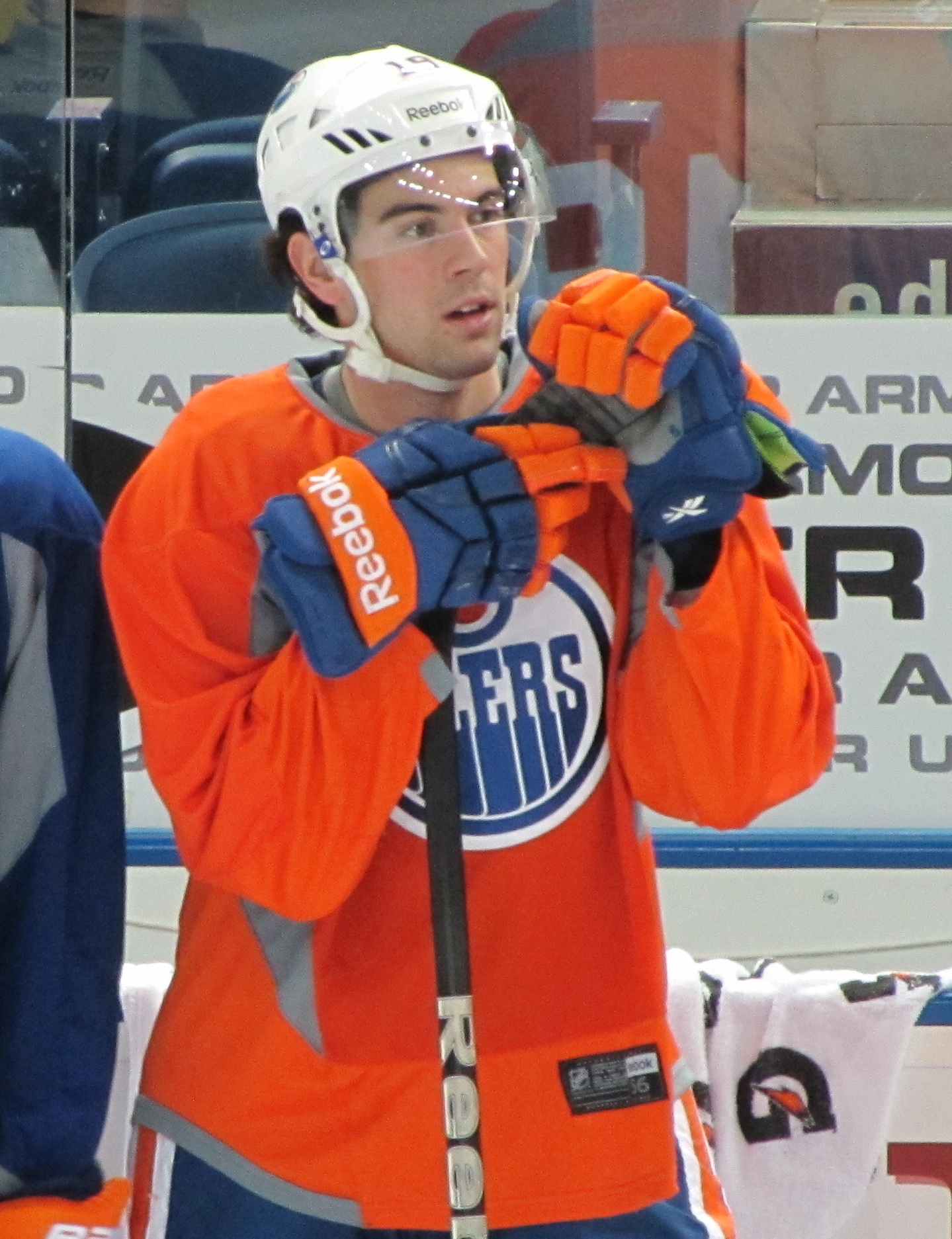
Schultz during Oilers training camp in 2013.

Once the NHL resumed play in January, Schultz joined the Oilers for the remainder of the NHL 2012–13 season. Despite this, he became the first rookie to be awarded the AHL's Eddie Shore Award as the league's top defenseman, despite participating in less than half of Oklahoma City's games. Schultz was also named a 2013 AHL First Team All Star. Schultz made his NHL debut on January 21 in a 3–2 win over the Vancouver Canucks. He scored his first goal the following day in a 6–3 loss to the San Jose Sharks during the Oilers' home opener. Schultz finished his rookie season with eight goals and 19 assists through 48 games and was subsequently named to the NHL All-Rookie Team.

During the 2013 offseason, the Oilers added more defencemen to their roster including Andrew Ference, Philip Larsen, Anton Belov, and Darnell Nurse. Schultz returned to the Oilers for the 2013–14 season where he set new career-highs in goals, assists, and points through 74 games in the final year of his contract. "He began the season slowly as he missed eight games following a groin injury during a game against the Toronto Maple Leafs on October 29. Prior to returning on November 20, the Oilers had maintained a losing 2–6–0 record. He was expected to have been able to return earlier but was deemed not ready. In his first game back from the injury, Schultz scored his first goal of the season in an eventual 7–0 win over the Columbus Blue Jackets.

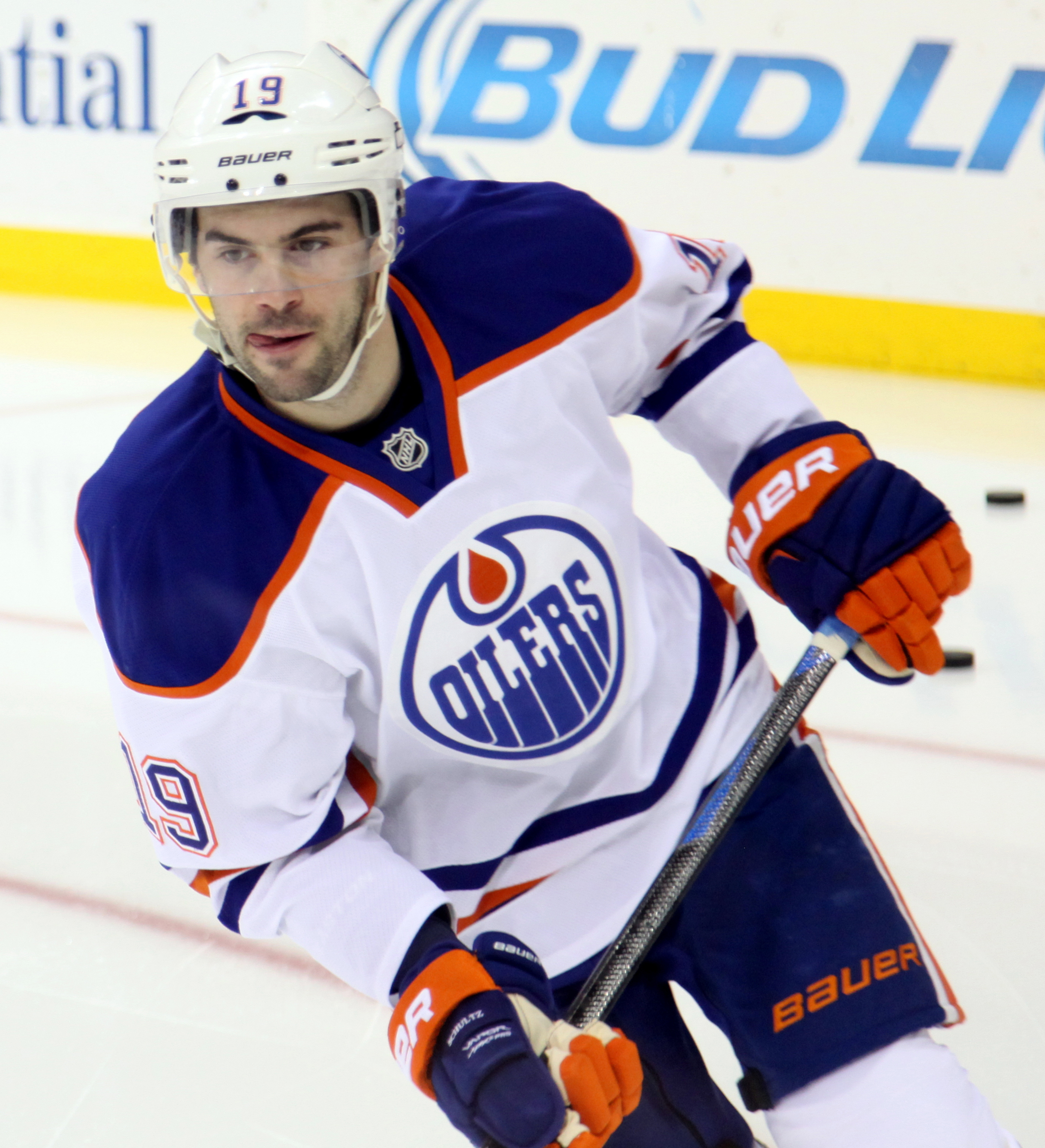
Schultz appeared in 248 games for the Oilers before being traded to Pittsburgh in 2016

On August 28, 2014, Schultz signed a new one-year contract with the Oilers valued at $3.675 million. Schultz began the 2014–15 season with 11 points and a minus-eight rating through 28 games as the Oilers struggled to win games. As such, head coach Dallas Eakins scratched Schultz on November 27 for their game against the Nashville Predators. Schultz struggled on the power play during the coaching tenure of Eakins but improved as the Oilers hired Todd Nelson in January 2015. The following year, he signed another one-year contract worth $3.9 million to avoid salary arbitration. However, Schultz suffered a back injury early in the 2015–16 season and was expected to miss two to four weeks to recover. He missed 14 games before returning to the Oilers lineup. In his first five games back, Schultz averaged between 15 and 18 minutes of ice time while playing with Oscar Klefbom.

=== Pittsburgh Penguins ===
On February 27, 2016, with the Oilers out of playoff contention for the 2015–16 season, and suffering the worst season of his professional career with 10 points in 45 games, Schultz was traded to the Pittsburgh Penguins in exchange for a third-round pick in the 2016 NHL entry draft. He was specifically recruited by head coach Mike Sullivan due to his offensive talents, speed, and strong breakouts of the defensive zone. Due to immigration issues and lack of practice, Schultz was unable to make his debut with the Penguins during the first three games following the trade. He eventually made his debut with the team on March 6 against the New Jersey Devils, playing on the third defensive pair with Ian Cole. He was eventually tried out on the Penguins first powerplay unit with Kris Letang, Beau Bennett, Patric Hörnqvist, and Sidney Crosby. As the Penguins qualified for the 2016 Stanley Cup playoffs they faced off against the New York Rangers in the first round. Although the Penguins advanced, Schultz only saw 5:52 minutes of ice time in game one before he was scratched for the remainder of the series. During the second round, Schultz saw increased playing time due to injuries and suspensions to the defensive core. He debuted against the Capitals in game four where he logged 17:56 minutes of ice time in the 3–1 win. Following his debut, he continued to be inserted into the lineup and replaced Olli Määttä on the blue line. After the Penguins eliminated the Capitals, they met with the Tampa Bay Lightning in the Eastern Conference Final. During this series, Schultz stepped into a larger role on the ice including time on the power play. He continued to provide offence from the third pair with Ian Cole but also saw time on the power play with Sidney Crosby, Evgeni Malkin, and Phil Kessel. After eliminating the Lightning in game seven, the Penguins faced off against the San Jose Sharks in the 2016 Stanley Cup Final. On the third defensive pair with Cole in game one, Schultz played nearly 19 minutes of ice time and earned a primary assist on the Penguins’ opening goal. On June 12, 2016, Schultz won his first Stanley Cup with the Penguins after defeating the Sharks in game six. On July 13, 2016, after testing free agency, Schultz returned to the Penguins, signing a one-year, $1.4 million contract.

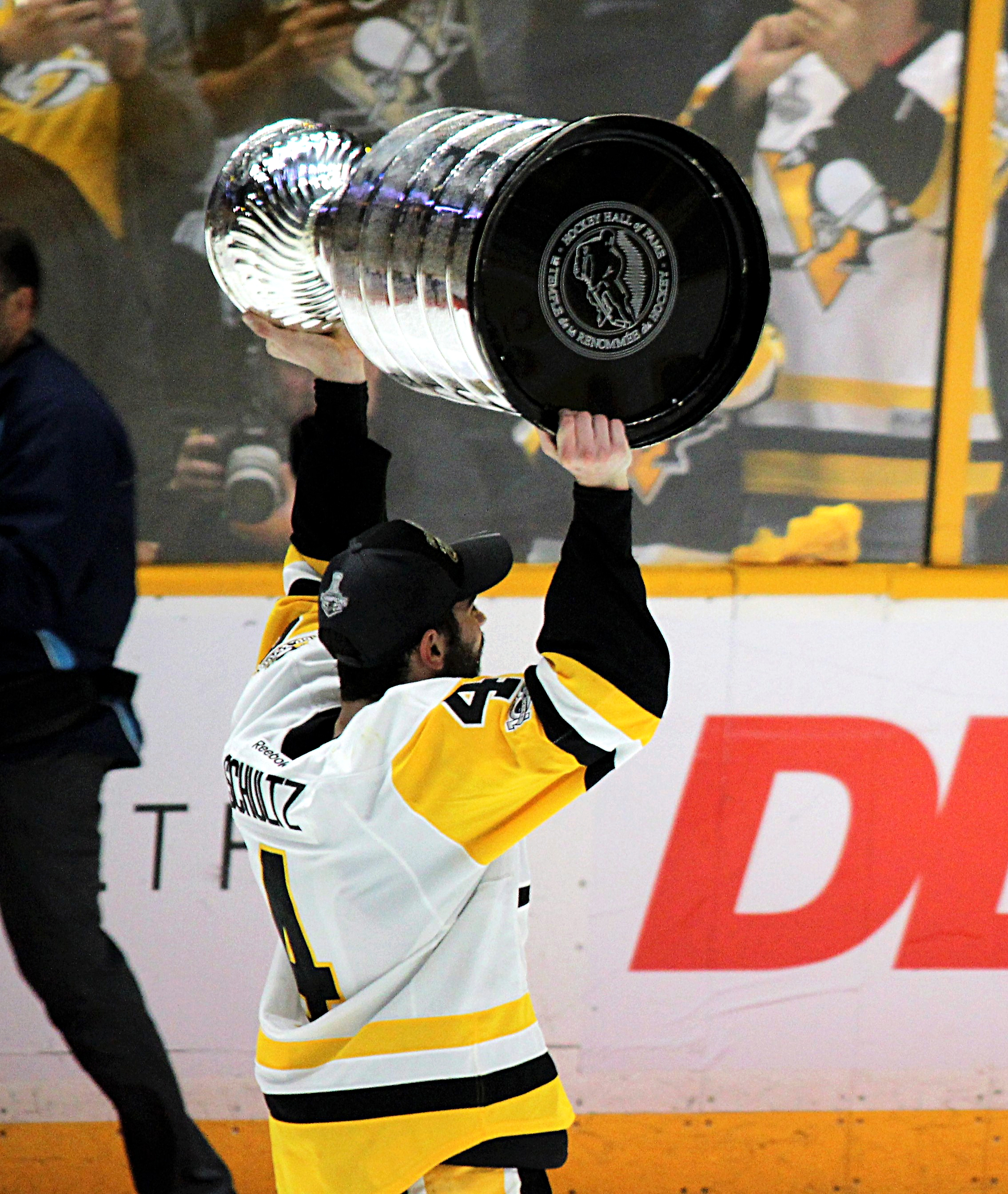
Schultz won the Stanley Cup with the Penguins in the 2016 and 2017

Schultz returned to the Penguins for the 2016–17 season where he experienced a breakout campaign, setting career-highs in goals, assists, and points. He emerged as the top blue-liner for the Penguins due to star defenceman Letang being limited to only 41 games with various injuries. At the beginning of the season, Schultz immediately stepped back into the first power-play unit role where he averaged over 27 shot attempts per 60 minutes of power play time through five games. Although he had increased responsibilities, Schultz remained defensive partners with Cole. Between November 30 and December 9, the pair accumulated a total of 15 points between the two of them through five games. Schultz also maintained a five-game scoring streak, including three multi-point nights for a total of eight points. Through December, Schultz also became the lone defenseman on the Penguins power play unit, a role which he continued even after Letang returned to the lineup. By the end of December, Schultz, Crosby, and Malkin ranked as the NHL's top-three scorers for the month of December.

As the season continued and Schultz stepped more into his new role, he averaged 19:15 of ice-time per game and had proven to be valuable to the team when 5-on-5 and shorthanded. By the mid-point of the season, Schultz ranked 7th among blueliners in scoring with 26 points and he ranked second best in the league with a plus-minus of +24. His scoring depth helped the Penguins rank fifth on the power play and second in goals per game. He had accumulated 39 points over 56 games before suffering a concussion during a game against the Winnipeg Jets on February 17. While Schultz, Letang, Trevor Daley, and Määttä were recovering from injuries, the Penguins added Ron Hainsey to help their depleted defence. Schultz eventually returned to the Penguins lineup for their Stadium Series against the Philadelphia Flyers after missing three games. As he was cautious following his injury, Schultz remained pointless in his first three games back before regaining his confidence and scoring five points in two games. His increased confidence and strong work ethic also earned him praise from teammates and coach Mike Sullivan. Schultz also credited his confidence for his increase in production, saying: "I have my confidence back. I needed a change of scenery and new environment. Luckily, I got a good opportunity to go elsewhere and try to get my game back on track. It worked out. I'm just trying to keep working hard and keep getting that confidence up." He finished the regular season with career-highs in goals (12), assists (39), points (51) and plus-minus (+27). His impressive regular season was recognized with numerous Norris Trophy votes as the NHL's Top Defenceman.

As the Penguins clinched a playoff berth, Schultz was expected to play a bigger role in the postseason due to Letang being ruled out for the playoffs. The Penguins faced off against the Columbus Blue Jackets in the first round of the 2017 Stanley Cup playoffs. After defeating the Blue Jackets in five games, the Penguins met with the Washington Capitals in the Eastern Conference Second Round. Schultz and Cole continued to be a strong defensive pair for the Penguins during the series. Schultz led the team with an average of 21:10 minutes per game as he helped the Penguins defeat the Capitals in seven games to advance to the Eastern Conference Final. In game two of the Conference Final, Schultz suffered an injury following an open-ice hit from Ottawa defenseman Dion Phaneuf. He returned to the Penguins lineup for game seven, during which he scored the Penguins’ only power play of the game, at 11:44 of the third period, to advance them to the 2017 Stanley Cup Final. As the Penguins advanced to the Final, Schultz had tallied ten points and three goals through 15 games in the playoffs. On June 11, Schultz and the Penguins defeated the Nashville Predators in six games to repeat as Stanley Cup Champions. On July 1, 2017, the first day of free agency, Schultz signed a three-year, $16.5 million contract to stay with the Penguins. He was also protected by the Penguins and unavailable for the Vegas Golden Knights in the 2017 NHL expansion draft.

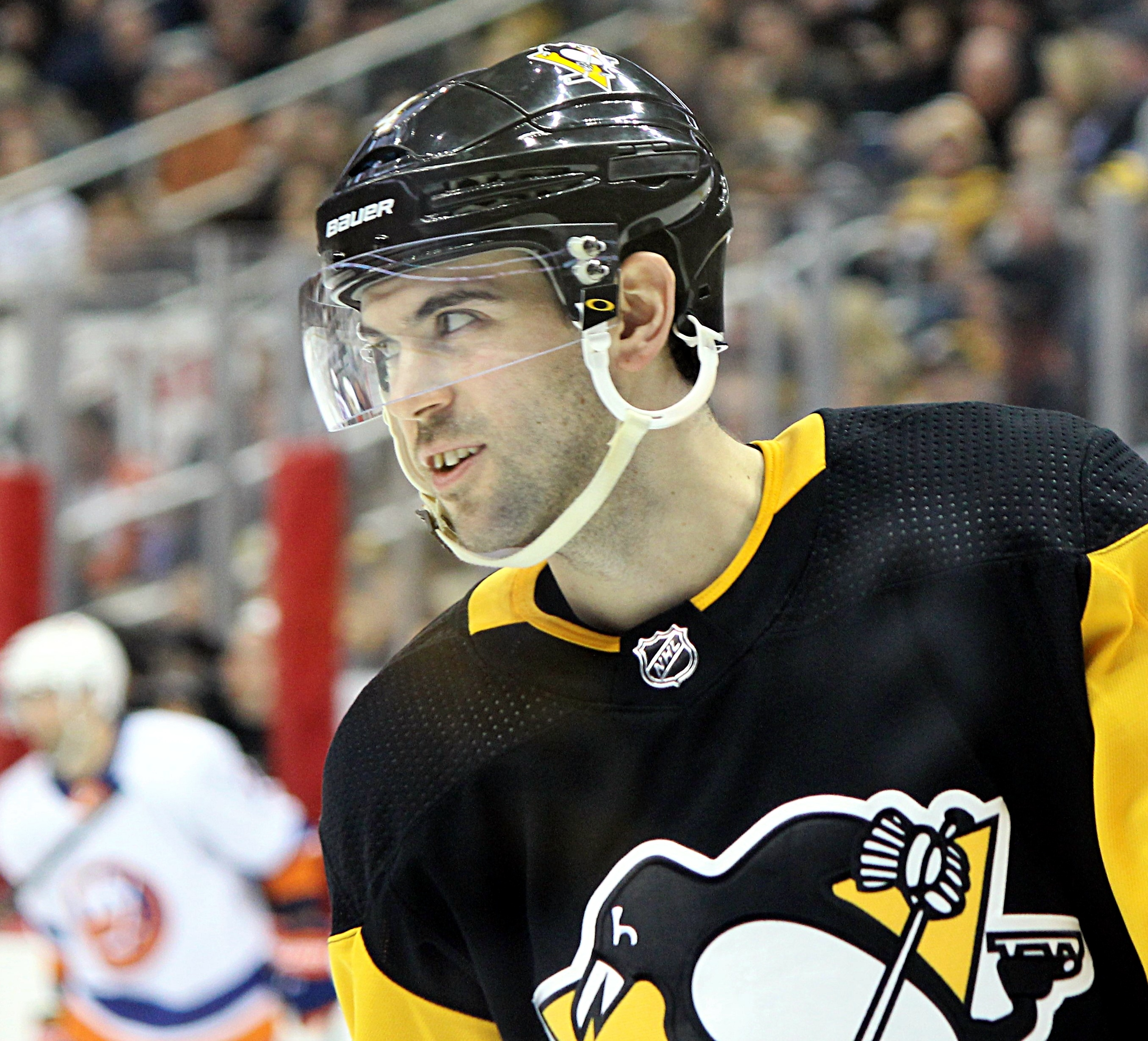
Schultz with the Penguins in 2018

In the first year of his contract, Schultz failed to replicate his previous seasons' scoring prowess due to injuries and illnesses. Schultz began the 2017–18 season by picking up one goal and two assists through his first 10 games while also averaging 18:36 of ice time, before suffering another concussion during a game against the Oilers. He was subsequently placed on injured reserve by the Penguins on October 26. He returned to the Penguins lineup after missing six games and immediately scored on his first shift to lift the Penguins 3–1 over the Arizona Coyotes. Upon his return, head coach Mike Sullivan placed Schultz back into the Penguins top power-play unit with Letang. He continued to make an impact in the lineup and quickly accumulated seven more points before suffering a lower-body injury in a December game against the New York Rangers. He was placed on injured reserve by the Penguins on December 7 and missed 11 games to recover. He returned to the lineup on January 4, 2018, in a win over the Philadelphia Flyers. While he was recovering, the Penguins traded for Jamie Oleksiak, who quickly became Schultz's new defensive partner. A few weeks following his return, Schultz left a game against the Los Angeles Kings in the third period after being crosschecked by Dustin Brown. As a result of his actions, Brown received a five-minute major, game misconduct, and a fine of $10,000, the maximum allowable under the CBA. Although Schultz left for the remainder of the game, he was able to practice with the team the following day. The following month, Schultz also missed two games due to an undisclosed illness. Schultz played his 400th career NHL game on March 23, 2018, in a game against the Devils and later helped the Penguins clinch a playoff berth. Schultz finished the regular season tallying seven assists in his final seven games. Despite the influx of scoring in the final few games, Schultz finished the 2017–18 regular season with four goals and 23 assists. After eliminating the Flyers in Round One, the Penguins fell to the Capitals in the Eastern Conference Second Round.

Following his lacklustre season, Schultz entered the Penguins training camp with the expectation of improving during the 2018–19 season. However, just days into the new season, Schultz broke his leg in a game against the Montreal Canadiens and was placed on injured reserve. He made his return to the Penguins lineup on February 19, 2019, where he picked up one assist in the 5–4 loss to the Calgary Flames. One week after his return, he scored his first goal of the season and played over 30 minutes in the 2019 NHL Stadium Series overtime loss to the Flyers. During the Stadium Series, defencemen Letang and Brian Dumoulin suffered long-term injuries leading to coach Sullivan to rely more heavily on Schultz, Jack Johnson, Chad Ruhwedel, and Marcus Pettersson. Schultz later assisted on Malkin's 1,000th NHL point, leading him to a total of one goal and 12 assists over 17 games. Schultz and the Penguins qualified for the 2019 Stanley Cup playoffs but they were swept by the New York Islanders in Round One.

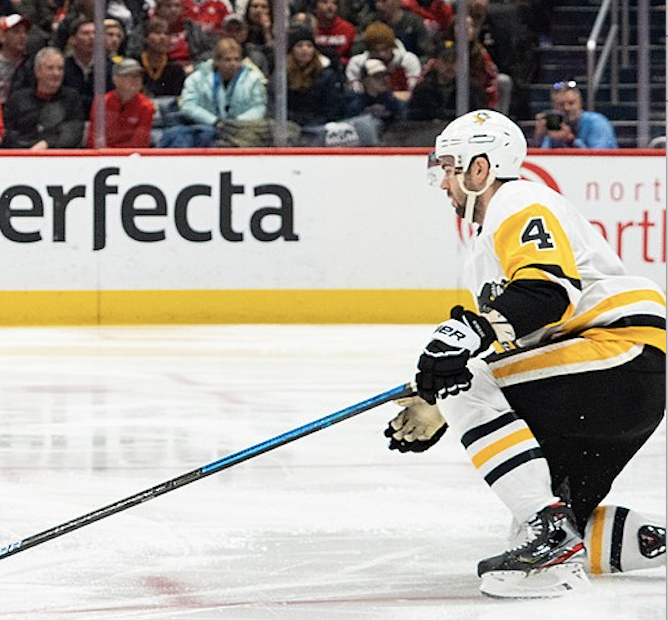
Schultz defending against Washington Capitals forward T. J. Oshie in 2020

Schultz returned to the Penguins for the 2019–20 season, which would prove to be his final season in a Penguins uniform. He stayed healthy through the Penguins' six preseason games, and he collected a pair of assists in each one for a team-leading six points. Once the regular season began, Schultz impressed coaching staff as he led all Penguins defencemen in power-play points through mid-October. He quickly accumulated two goals and six assists through 21 games before missing seven games due to a lower-body injury. He went pointless through the first six games following his return before he suffered another lower-body injury on December 20 during a game against the Calgary Flames. Schultz subsequently missed 16 games to recover and returned to the Penguins lineup on January 31, 2020, for their 4–3 overtime win over the Flyers. When the NHL paused play due to the COVID-19 pandemic in March, Schultz had accumulated 12 points through 46 games. During the 2020 Stanley Cup qualifiers, Schultz and Jack Johnson struggled as the third defensive pair and they were on the ice for the majority of the Montreal Canadiens' ten goals throughout the series. After the Penguins were swept in the qualifiers, Penguins general manager Jim Rutherford revealed the organization would "move on" from Schultz, choosing not to re-sign him.

=== Washington Capitals ===
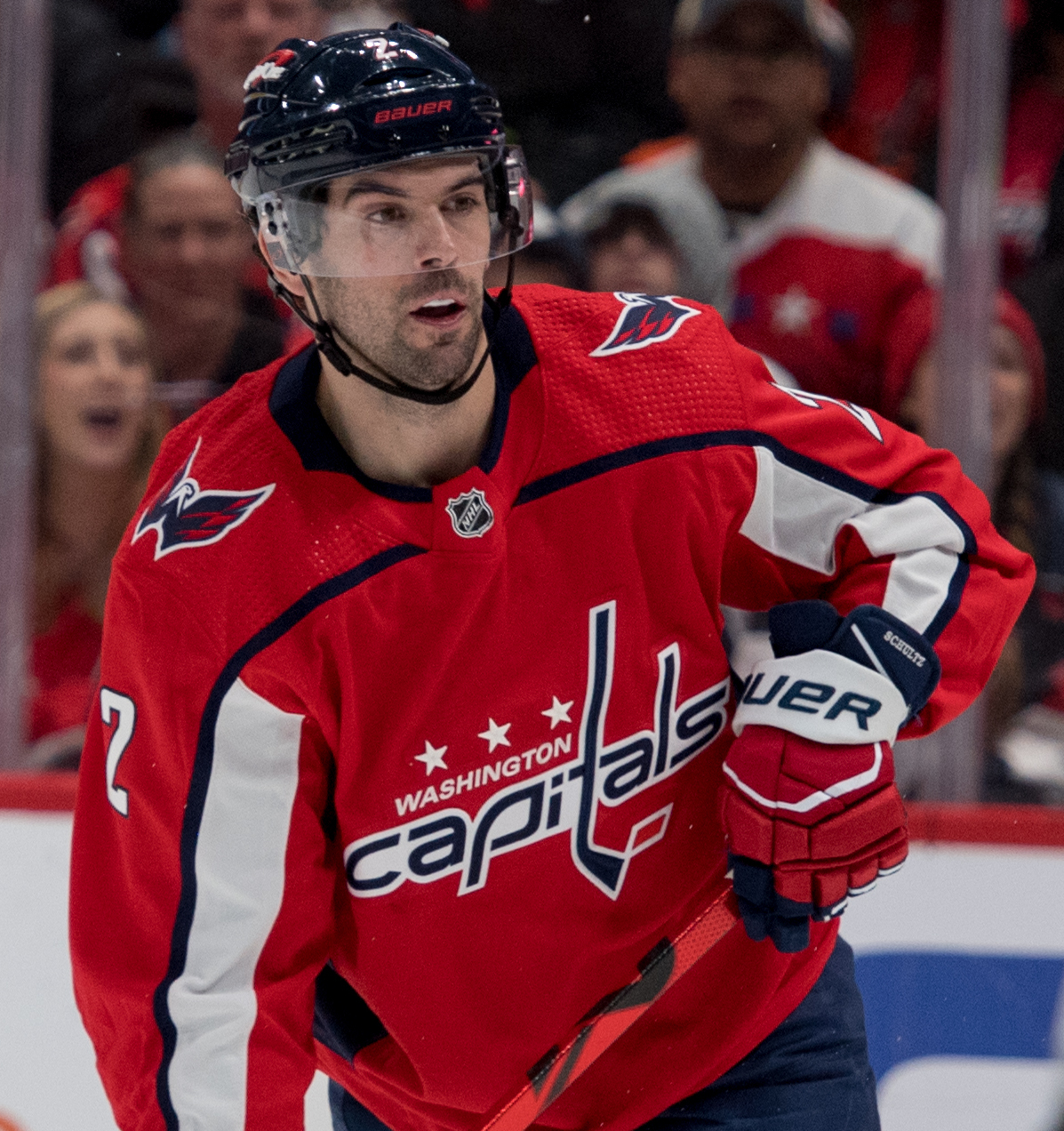
Schultz during a game against the Los Angeles Kings in December 2021

On October 9, 2020, Schultz signed a two-year, $8 million contract, with an average annual value of $4 million, with the Washington Capitals as a free agent. He began the season playing on the right side of Jonas Siegenthaler. As the Capitals maintained a season-opening point streak of 10 games Schultz recorded two goals and four assists. However, during the streak, Schultz took a puck to the face during a game against the New York Islanders on January 28 and was considered day-to-day. Schultz subsequently missed four games to recover but was able to have extra practices due to three games being postponed due to an outbreak of COVID-19. As the season progressed, Schultz began a mainstay on the second pair with Dmitry Orlov and had quickly accumulated two goals and 15 assists through 30 games by late March. Despite missing three games in April due to a lower-body injury, Schultz recorded two assists to help the Capitals clinch a playoff position on April 29. The Capitals eventually fell to the Boston Bruins in game five of the best-of-7 Stanley Cup First Round. Following their elimination, the Capitals opted to leave Schultz unprotected for the 2021 NHL expansion draft and available to the Kraken.

Schultz returned to the Capitals for the 2021–22 season as the Capitals maintained a season-opening point streak for eight games. After Schultz suffered an injury in November 2021, Dennis Cholowski replaced him for three games until Schultz was ready to return to the lineup. He later missed more games due to him entering the NHL's COVID-19 protocol list. Schultz finished the regular season with four goals and 19 assists for 23 points through 74 games while playing on the third pairing alongside Trevor van Riemsdyk. During the 2022 Stanley Cup playoffs, Schultz recorded a goal and two assists for three points.

=== Seattle Kraken ===
On July 13, 2022, Schultz signed as a free agent on a two-year, $6 million contract with the Seattle Kraken. Upon joining the team, he was often paired with Jamie Oleksiak, his former Penguins teammate, as the team's second defensive pair. Schultz quickly accumulated 10 points over the final six games of November. He had recorded five goals and 19 assists through 42 games before suffering an injury during a game against the Oilers in late January. Schultz missed six games to recover from the injury and returned to the Kraken lineup on February 9. While Schultz recovered, Will Borgen replaced him as Oleksiak's partner but reunited with Carson Soucy once Schultz returned. Once the Kraken qualified for the 2023 Stanley Cup playoffs, Schultz was partnered with Soucy as the Kraken's third pair during their postseason run. During the Kraken's second round series against the Dallas Stars, Schultz helped set a franchise records for fastest three goals to start a playoff game. He scored the first of three goals in a span of 52 seconds in game one to set the record for the Kraken and mark the sixth-fastest three goals by one team in Stanley Cup playoff history.

Schultz started the 2023–24 season on the Kraken's second defensive pairing with former Penguins teammate Brian Dumoulin. On October 30, Schultz recorded his 300th career NHL point in an overtime win against the Tampa Bay Lightning. On December 9, during another game against the Lightning, Schultz suffered an upper-body injury after he was struck in the face by a puck. He finished the season with seven goals and 19 assists.

=== HC Lugano and retirement ===
Ahead of the 2024-25 season, Schultz was considered for professional tryout contracts from the Oilers and Vancouver Canucks. However, after failing to secure a contract in the NHL, Schultz signed with HC Lugano for the remainder of the 2024–25 National League season on October 23, 2024. On December 13, after playing only eight games in Switzerland, Schultz announced his retirement from hockey due to personal reasons.

== Post-retirement ==
On June 18, 2026, Schultz joined the Seattle Kraken's coaching staff in a player development role.

== Personal life ==
Schultz was born on July 6, 1990, in Kelowna, British Columbia to parents Kim and Glenn.

Schultz is married to fellow Kelowna native, Jillian.

== Career statistics ==
Career statistics from Elite Prospects.

=== Regular season and playoffs ===
			Regular season					Playoffs
Season	Team	League	GP	G	A	Pts	PIM	GP	G	A	Pts	PIM
2006–07	Westside Warriors	BCHL	2	1	0	1	0	—	—	—	—	—
2007–08	Westside Warriors	BCHL	57	9	31	40	28	11	3	5	8	4
2008–09	Westside Warriors	BCHL	49	15	35	50	29	6	1	2	3	2
2009–10	University of Wisconsin	WCHA	43	6	16	22	12	—	—	—	—	—
2010–11	University of Wisconsin	WCHA	41	18	29	47	28	—	—	—	—	—
2011–12	University of Wisconsin	WCHA	37	16	28	44	12	—	—	—	—	—
2012–13	Oklahoma City Barons	AHL	34	18	30	48	6	—	—	—	—	—
2012–13	Edmonton Oilers	NHL	48	8	19	27	8	—	—	—	—	—
2013–14	Edmonton Oilers	NHL	74	11	22	33	16	—	—	—	—	—
2014–15	Edmonton Oilers	NHL	81	6	25	31	12	—	—	—	—	—
2015–16	Edmonton Oilers	NHL	45	3	7	10	14	—	—	—	—	—
2015–16	Pittsburgh Penguins	NHL	18	1	7	8	2	15	0	4	4	0
2016–17	Pittsburgh Penguins	NHL	78	12	39	51	34	21	4	9	13	4
2017–18	Pittsburgh Penguins	NHL	63	4	23	27	14	12	1	7	8	2
2018–19	Pittsburgh Penguins	NHL	29	2	13	15	4	4	1	2	3	0
2019–20	Pittsburgh Penguins	NHL	46	3	9	12	6	4	0	1	1	0
2020–21	Washington Capitals	NHL	46	3	24	27	10	5	0	0	0	2
2021–22	Washington Capitals	NHL	74	4	19	23	16	6	1	2	3	6
2022–23	Seattle Kraken	NHL	73	7	27	34	40	14	3	7	10	2
2023–24	Seattle Kraken	NHL	70	7	19	26	22	—	—	—	—	—
2024–25	HC Lugano	NL	8	0	6	6	4	—	—	—	—	—
NHL totals			745	71	253	324	198	81	10	32	42	16

Medal record

Ice hockey

Representing Canada West

World Junior A Challenge
Silver medal – second place	2008 Camrose	

=== International ===
Year	Team	Event	Result	GP	G	A	Pts	PIM
2013	Canada	WC	5th	8	0	4	4	2
Senior totals				8	0	4	4	2

== Awards and honours ==
Awards	Year	Ref
College
All-WCHA Rookie Team	2009–10	
All-WCHA First Team	2010–11, 2011–12	
WCHA Defensive Player of the Year	2010–11, 2011–12	
AHCA West First-Team All-American	2010–11, 2011–12	
AHL
AHL Defenseman of the Year	2012–13	
NHL
NHL All-Rookie Team	2012–13	
Stanley Cup champion	2016, 2017	

Awards and achievements
Preceded by Brendan Smith	WCHA Defensive Player of the Year; 2010–11, 2011–12	Succeeded by Nick Jensen
