= 2019 NHL Stadium Series =

Outdoor National Hockey League game

	1	2	3	OT	Total
Pittsburgh Penguins	1	1	1	0	3
Philadelphia Flyers	1	0	2	1	4
- Date: February 23, 2019
- Venue: Lincoln Financial Field
- City: Philadelphia
- Attendance: 69,620

The 2019 NHL Stadium Series (officially the 2019 Coors Light NHL Stadium Series) was a regular season National Hockey League (NHL) game played outdoors, as part of the Stadium Series of games held at football or baseball stadiums. The Philadelphia Flyers defeated the Pittsburgh Penguins 4–3 in overtime at Lincoln Financial Field in Philadelphia, on February 23, 2019.

This was the only game in the Stadium Series held during the 2018–19 season (as opposed to multiple games in 2014 and 2016).

== Background ==
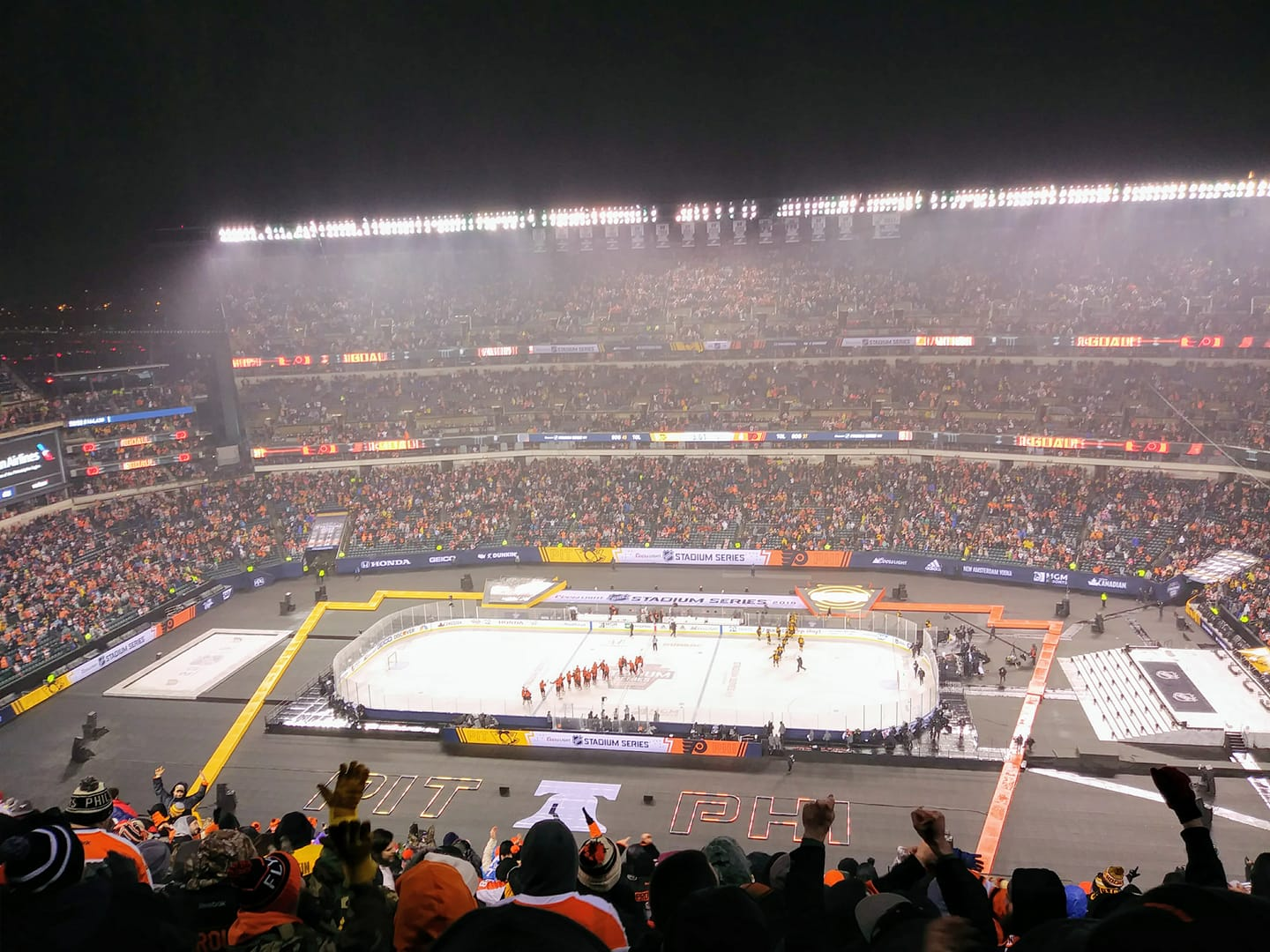
Flyers celebrating after their overtime victory.

In 2016, the Pittsburgh Penguins and the Philadelphia Flyers worked out an agreement to play a home-and-home series of outdoors games. The first game that was planned eventually became the 2017 Stadium Series game at Heinz Field in Pittsburgh. The NHL does not usually schedule teams to appear in outdoors games in consecutive years, so Philadelphia did not host this rematch until 2019. The two archrivals had also discussed playing a neutral site game at Beaver Stadium at State College, Pennsylvania, but it never materialized, due mainly to concerns about Beaver Stadium's plumbing being unable to withstand an event in winter.

== Game summary ==
The Flyers scored two goals with an extra attacker/goalie pulled late in the third period to tie the game at 3–3, then won it off of Claude Giroux's score at 1:59 into overtime. Jakub Voracek scored the tying goal with 20 seconds left in regulation, as well as recording two assists. Voracek's score came after James van Riemsdyk's power play goal with 3:04 left cut the Penguins' lead to 3–2.

Scoring summary
Period	Team	Goal	Assist(s)	Time	Score
1st	PIT	Sidney Crosby (26)	Kris Letang (38)	07:59	1–0 PIT
1st	PHI	Sean Couturier (25)	Jakub Voracek (36), Oskar Lindblom (13)	12:06	1–1 TIE
2nd	PIT	Justin Schultz (1)	Patric Hornqvist (12), Sidney Crosby (49)	10:01	2–1 PIT
3rd	PIT	Evgeni Malkin (19)	Zach Aston-Reese (8), Phil Kessel (42)	6:29	3–1 PIT
3rd	PHI	James van Riemsdyk (16) – pp	Jakub Voracek (37), Claude Giroux (45)	16:56	3–2 PIT
3rd	PHI	Jakub Voracek (16)	Sean Couturier (33)	19:40	3–3 TIE
OT	PHI	Claude Giroux (18)	Nolan Patrick (12), Travis Sanheim (19)	1:59	4–3 PHI

Number in parentheses represents the player's total in goals or assists to that point of the season

Penalty summary
Period	Team	Player	Penalty	Time	PIM
1st	PHI	Robert Hagg	Roughing	05:47	2:00
1st	PIT	Garrett Wilson	Roughing	05:47	2:00
1st	PHI	Wayne Simmonds	Unsportsmanlike Conduct	16:23	2:00
1st	PIT	Kris Letang	Unsportsmanlike Conduct (served by Patric Hornqvist)	16:23	2:00
2nd	PIT	Jack Johnson	Tripping	01:03	2:00
3rd	PIT	Evgeni Malkin	Cross-Checking	14:51	2:00
3rd	PHI	Robert Hagg	Cross-Checking	14:51	2:00
3rd	PIT	Matt Cullen	Slashing	15:40	2:00

Shots by period
Team	1	2	3	OT	Total
PIT	18	12	10	3	43
PHI	8	9	18	2	37

Power play opportunities
Team	Goals/Opportunities
Pittsburgh	None
Philadelphia	1/2

Three star selections
	Team	Player	Statistics
1st	PHI	Jakub Voracek	1 goal, 2 assists
2nd	PIT	Justin Schultz	1 goal
3rd	PHI	Sean Couturier	1 goal, 1 assist

== Team rosters ==
Pittsburgh Penguins
#		Player	Position
1	(United States)	Casey DeSmith	G
2	(United States)	Chad Ruhwedel	D
4	(Canada)	Justin Schultz	D
7	(United States)	Matt Cullen	C
8	(United States)	Brian Dumoulin	D
10	(Canada)	Garrett Wilson	LW
14	(Canada)	Tanner Pearson	LW
17	(United States)	Bryan Rust	RW
19	(Canada)	Jared McCann	C
27	(United States)	Nick Bjugstad	C
28	(Sweden)	Marcus Pettersson	D
30	(Canada)	Matt Murray	G
46	(United States)	Zach Aston-Reese	RW
58	(Canada)	Kris Letang (A)	D
59	(United States)	Jake Guentzel	C
71	(Russia)	Evgeni Malkin (A)	C
72	(Sweden)	Patric Hornqvist	RW
73	(United States)	Jack Johnson	D
81	(United States)	Phil Kessel	C
87	(Canada)	Sidney Crosby (C)	C
Head coach: (United States) Mike Sullivan

Philadelphia Flyers
#		Player	Position
6	(Canada)	Travis Sanheim	D
8	(Sweden)	Robert Hagg	D
9	(Russia)	Ivan Provorov	D
11	(Canada)	Travis Konecny	C
12	(Austria)	Michael Raffl	LW
14	(Canada)	Sean Couturier	C
17	(Canada)	Wayne Simmonds (A)	RW
19	(Canada)	Nolan Patrick	C
21	(Canada)	Scott Laughton	LW
23	(Sweden)	Oskar Lindblom	LW
25	(United States)	James van Riemsdyk	LW
27	(United States)	Justin Bailey	RW
28	(Canada)	Claude Giroux (C)	RW
33	(Canada)	Cam Talbot	G
37	(Canada)	Brian Elliott	G
44	(Canada)	Phil Varone	C
47	(Canada)	Andrew MacDonald (A)	D
53	(United States)	Shayne Gostisbehere	D
61	(Canada)	Philippe Myers	D
93	(Czech Republic)	Jakub Voracek	RW
Head coach: (United States) Scott Gordon

Casey DeSmith and Cam Talbot dressed as the back-up goaltenders. Neither entered the game.

=== Scratches ===
- Pittsburgh Penguins: Dominik Simon, Juuso Riikola, Teddy Blueger
- Philadelphia Flyers: Radko Gudas, Corban Knight, Carter Hart

== Pregame/Anthem/Entertainment ==
Keith Urban performed during the first intermission, and the Glorious Sons performed during the second intermission.

Before puck-drop Philadelphia sports legends were introduced. For the Phillies Jimmy Rollins, for the Eagles Jason Kelce, for the 76ers Tobias Harris and Boban Marjanovic, and for the Flyers Bobby Clarke.

After the legends were honored the Flyers' mascot Gritty made a surprise entrance. Then the teams entered.

The national anthem was performed by the Flyers' anthem singer, Lauren Hart.

A ceremonial puck-drop was done by the Eagles' coach, Doug Pederson.
