= 2023 NHL Stadium Series =

Outdoor National Hockey League game

	1	2	3	Total
Washington Capitals	0	0	1	1
Carolina Hurricanes	1	3	0	4
- Date: February 18, 2023
- Venue: Carter–Finley Stadium
- City: Raleigh
- Attendance: 56,961

The 2023 NHL Stadium Series was an outdoor regular season National Hockey League (NHL) game, part of the Stadium Series of games. The game took place on February 18, 2023, at Carter–Finley Stadium in Raleigh, North Carolina, with the Carolina Hurricanes hosting the Washington Capitals. The Hurricanes were originally scheduled to host the 2021 Stadium Series but the game was canceled due to the COVID-19 pandemic.

== Background ==
After he took majority control of the team in 2018, Hurricanes owner Thomas Dundon made it a goal to have his club play in its first outdoor game. In 2019, Dundon invited NHL Commissioner Gary Bettman to take a tour of Carter–Finley Stadium to see if it was feasible. On February 15, 2020, the league initially announced that the Hurricanes would host the 2021 Stadium Series. Before the league could finalize the game, the Hurricanes sought additional funding of $200,000 from the local government and other organizations to help offset the cost of hosting the game.

The COVID-19 pandemic forced the league to delay the conclusion of the 2019–20 playoffs until late September, and consequently push the start of the 2020–21 season to January 2021. On October 22, 2020, the NHL announced that it had postponed both the 2021 NHL Winter Classic and the 2021 All-Star Game due to "ongoing uncertainty" since both January events rely on fan participation. The decision to further postpone the 2021 Stadium Series game was made on December 23.

The Hurricanes later asked the league to move their outdoor game to the 2022–23 season, with team president and general manager Don Waddell stating that he wanted "to assure a safe environment". On February 4, 2022, the league confirmed that the Hurricanes would host the 2023 game, and later announced on March 3, 2022, that the Washington Capitals would be the opponent.

The game was Carolina's first outdoor game and Washington's fourth.

== Game summary ==
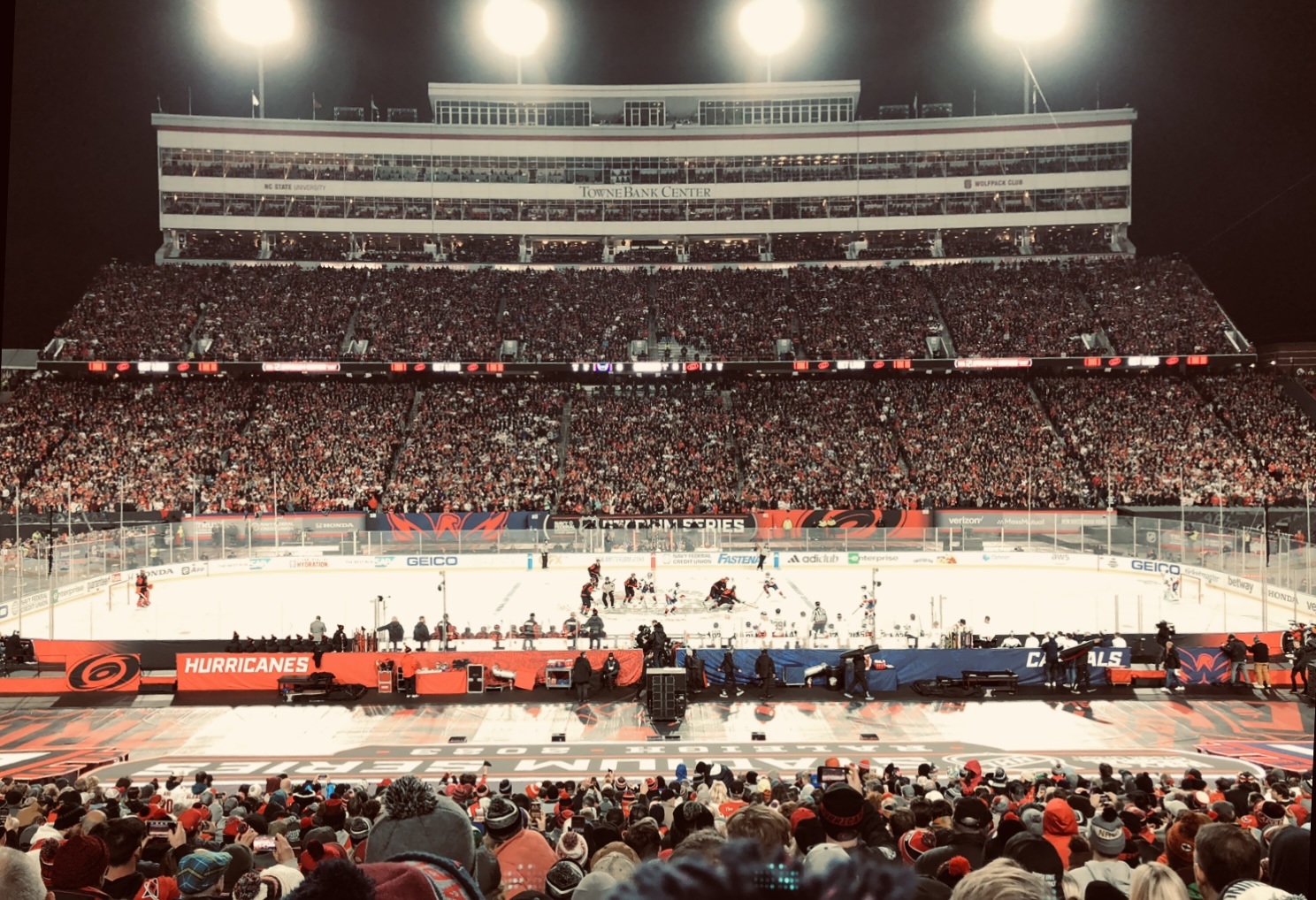
The 2023 NHL Stadium Series gets underway just after the opening faceoff.

Carolina controlled most of the game, scoring the first four goals en route to a 4–1 win. Martin Necas scored a goal and two assists, Jesperi Kotkaniemi and Teuvo Teravainen each scored a goal and an assist, Paul Stastny had a goal, and Frederik Andersen made 24 out of 25 saves and had an assist. Tom Wilson scored Washington's lone goal in the third period.

Scoring summary
Period	Team	Goal	Assist(s)	Time	Score
1st	CAR	Jesperi Kotkaniemi (10)	Teuvo Teravainen (21), Martin Necas (28)	2:11	CAR 1–0
2nd	CAR	Paul Stastny (7)	Jalen Chatfield (7), Jordan Martinook (17)	5:47	CAR 2–0
2nd	CAR	Martin Necas (22) – pp	Brent Burns (30), Jesperi Kotkaniemi (14)	8:48	CAR 3–0
2nd	CAR	Teuvo Teravainen (7)	Martin Necas (29), Frederik Andersen (1)	11:17	CAR 4–0
3rd	WSH	Tom Wilson (3)	Sonny Milano (15)	10:32	CAR 4–1

Number in parentheses represents the player's total in goals or assists to that point of the season

Penalty summary
Period	Team	Player	Penalty	Time	PIM
1st	CAR	Jesperi Kotkaniemi	Hooking	3:44	2:00
1st	CAR	Brady Skjei	Tripping	10:59	2:00
1st	WSH	Dmitry Orlov	Tripping	13:38	2:00
2nd	WSH	Nicklas Backstrom	Tripping	1:33	2:00
2nd	WSH	Evgeny Kuznetsov	High-sticking	7:16	2:00
2nd	WSH	Anthony Mantha	Cross-checking (served by Sonny Milano)	13:36	2:00
2nd	CAR	Jordan Martinook	Fighting – major	13:36	5:00
2nd	WSH	Anthony Mantha	Fighting – major	13:36	5:00
3rd	No penalties				

Shots by period
Team	1	2	3	Total
WSH	7	8	10	25
CAR	10	12	13	35

Power play opportunities
Team	Goals/Opportunities
Washington	0 / 2
Carolina	1 / 4

Three star selections
	Team	Player	Statistics
1st	CAR	Martin Necas	1 goal, 2 assists
2nd	CAR	Teuvo Teravainen	1 goal, 1 assist
3rd	CAR	Frederik Andersen	24 saves, 1 assist

== Team rosters ==
Washington Capitals
#		Player	Position
3	(United States)	Nick Jensen	D
9	(Russia)	Dmitry Orlov	D
15	(United States)	Sonny Milano	LW
17	(Canada)	Dylan Strome	C
19	(Sweden)	Nicklas Backstrom (A)	C
20	(Denmark)	Lars Eller	C
21	(United States)	Garnet Hathaway	RW
35	(Canada)	Darcy Kuemper	G
39	(Canada)	Anthony Mantha	RW
42	(Slovakia)	Martin Fehervary	D
43	(Canada)	Tom Wilson (A)	RW
52	(Canada)	Matt Irwin	D
56	(Sweden)	Erik Gustafsson	D
57	(United States)	Trevor van Riemsdyk	D
73	(United States)	Conor Sheary	LW
77	(United States)	T. J. Oshie (A)	RW
79	(United States)	Charlie Lindgren	G
90	(Sweden)	Marcus Johansson	LW
92	(Russia)	Evgeny Kuznetsov	C
96	(Canada)	Nicolas Aube-Kubel	RW
Head coach: (United States) Peter Laviolette

Carolina Hurricanes
#		Player	Position
5	(United States)	Jalen Chatfield	D
8	(Canada)	Brent Burns	D
11	(Canada)	Jordan Staal (C)	C
20	(Finland)	Sebastian Aho (A)	C
21	(United States)	Derek Stepan	C
22	(United States)	Brett Pesce	D
23	(United States)	Stefan Noesen	RW
24	(Canada)	Seth Jarvis	C
26	(United States)	Paul Stastny	C
31	(Denmark)	Frederik Andersen	G
32	(Finland)	Antti Raanta	G
37	(Russia)	Andrei Svechnikov	RW
44	(Canada)	Calvin de Haan	D
48	(Canada)	Jordan Martinook	LW
71	(Sweden)	Jesper Fast	RW
74	(United States)	Jaccob Slavin (A)	D
76	(United States)	Brady Skjei	D
82	(Finland)	Jesperi Kotkaniemi	C
86	(Finland)	Teuvo Teravainen	LW
88	(Czech Republic)	Martin Necas	C
Head coach: (Canada) Rod Brind'Amour

Charlie Lindgren and Antti Raanta dressed as the back-up goaltenders. Neither entered the game.

=== Scratches ===
- Washington Capitals: Alexander Alexeyev, Aliaksei Protas, Joe Snively
- Carolina Hurricanes: Dylan Coghlan

== Broadcasting ==
Originally scheduled to air on ESPN, the game was broadcast nationally in the United States by ABC and streamed on ESPN+ and was simulcast in Canada via Sportsnet.
