= 2017 NHL Stadium Series =

Outdoor National Hockey League game

	1	2	3	Total
Philadelphia Flyers	0	1	1	2
Pittsburgh Penguins	1	1	2	4
- Date: February 25, 2017
- Venue: Heinz Field
- City: Pittsburgh
- Attendance: 67,318

The 2017 NHL Stadium Series was a regular season National Hockey League (NHL) game played outdoors, part of the Stadium Series of games held at football or baseball stadiums. The Philadelphia Flyers played against the Pittsburgh Penguins at Heinz Field in Pittsburgh, Pennsylvania, on February 25, 2017.

This was the only game in the Stadium Series scheduled during the 2016–17 NHL season, although there were three other outdoor games previously played in that season. It was one of the most attended outdoor NHL games in history, with an attendance of 67,318.

== Background ==
The game was played to help mark the 50th anniversary of the Expansion of 1967, in which the Flyers and the Penguins, along with four other teams, were formed to double the league's size. This Flyers–Penguins rivalry matchup was originally considered for the 2017 NHL Winter Classic in January, but scheduling conflicts with the National Football League in both cities, along with the belief that Beaver Stadium (a neutral site venue mentioned as a potential site for a Flyers–Penguins outdoor contest) was not properly equipped to host an event during the winter, led to plans for a matchup being moved to a later date as a Stadium Series game in February.

Heinz Field previously hosted the 2011 NHL Winter Classic. This was also the Penguins' fourth outdoor game (after the 2008 and 2011 Winter Classics, and the 2014 Stadium Series), and the Flyers' third (after the 2010 and 2012 Winter Classics).

== Game summary ==
February 25, 2017	Philadelphia Flyers	2-4	Pittsburgh Penguins	Heinz Field	Recap

Pittsburgh's Jake Guentzel recorded two assists and Matt Murray made 36 saves en route to a 4-2 victory over Philadelphia. The Penguins got goals from Sidney Crosby, Nick Bonino, Matt Cullen and Chad Ruhwedel. Jakub Voracek and Shayne Gostisbehere scored for the Flyers.

Scoring summary
Period	Team	Goal	Assist(s)	Time	Score
1st	PIT	Sidney Crosby (34)	Jake Guentzel (7) and Scott Wilson (13)	11:18	1–0 PIT
2nd	PIT	Nick Bonino (9) - pp	Jake Guentzel (8) and Brian Dumoulin (10)	6:44	2–0 PIT
2nd	PHI	Jakub Voracek (16)	Andrew MacDonald (12)	11:14	2–1 PIT
3rd	PIT	Matt Cullen (10)	Eric Fehr (5) and Tom Kuhnhackl (5)	1:50	3–1 PIT
3rd	PHI	Shayne Gostisbehere (5) - pp	Claude Giroux (31) and Brayden Schenn (21)	6:48	3–2 PIT
3rd	PIT	Chad Ruhwedel (2)	Evgeni Malkin (36)	14:06	4–2 PIT

Number in parentheses represents the player's total in goals or assists to that point of the season

Penalty summary
Period	Team	Player	Penalty	Time	PIM
1st	PIT	Evgeni Malkin	Unsportsmanlike conduct	6:39	2:00
1st	PHI	Ivan Provorov	Hooking	16:25	2:00
2nd	PHI	Shayne Gostisbehere	Interference	5:08	2:00
2nd	PIT	Eric Fehr	Roughing	7:20	2:00
2nd	PIT	Chris Kunitz	Roughing	10:50	2:00
2nd	PHI	Dale Weise	Roughing	10:50	2:00
2nd	PHI	Brandon Manning	Holding	19:09	2:00
3rd	PIT	Jake Guentzel	Holding	6:34	2:00
3rd	PIT	Cameron Gaunce	Tripping	11:19	2:00
3rd	PHI	Shayne Gostisbehere	Interference	15:41	2:00
3rd	PHI	Wayne Simmonds	Slashing	18:00	2:00

Shots by period
Team	1	2	3	T
Philadelphia	16	12	10	38
Pittsburgh	7	11	11	29

Power play opportunities
Team	Goals/Opportunities
Philadelphia	1/4
Pittsburgh	1/5

Three star selections
	Team	Player	Statistics
1st	PIT	Jake Guentzel	2 assists
2nd	PIT	Sidney Crosby	1 goal
3rd	PHI	Jakub Voracek	1 goal

== Team rosters ==
Philadelphia Flyers
#		Player	Position
3	(Czech Republic)	Radko Gudas	D
9	(Russia)	Ivan Provorov	D
10	(Canada)	Brayden Schenn	D
12	(Austria)	Michael Raffl	LW
14	(Canada)	Sean Couturier	C
17	(Canada)	Wayne Simmonds (A)	RW
22	(Finland)	Dale Weise	RW
24	(Canada)	Matt Read	RW
25	(Canada)	Nick Cousins	LW
28	(Canada)	Claude Giroux (C)	C
30	(Czech Republic)	Michal Neuvirth	G
23	(Canada)	Brandon Manning	D
32	(Switzerland)	Mark Streit	D
35	(Canada)	Steve Mason	G
40	(Canada)	Jordan Weal	RW
47	(Canada)	Andrew MacDonald	D
53	(United States)	Shayne Gostisbehere	D
76	(United States)	Chris VandeVelde	LW
78	(France)	Pierre-Edouard Bellemare (A)	C
93	(Czech Republic)	Jakub Voracek	RW
Head coach: (Canada) Dave Hakstol

Pittsburgh Penguins
#		Player	Position
2	(United States)	Chad Ruhwedel	D
4	(Canada)	Justin Schultz	D
7	(United States)	Matt Cullen	C
8	(United States)	Brian Dumoulin	D
13	(United States)	Nick Bonino	C
14	(Canada)	Chris Kunitz (A)	LW
16	(Canada)	Eric Fehr	C
23	(Canada)	Scott Wilson	LW
24	(Canada)	Cameron Gaunce	D
28	(United States)	Ian Cole	D
29	(Canada)	Marc-Andre Fleury	G
34	(Germany)	Tom Kuhnhackl	RW
30	(Canada)	Matt Murray	G
59	(United States)	Jake Guentzel	C/LW
62	(Sweden)	Carl Hagelin	LW
65	(United States)	Ron Hainsey	RW
71	(Russia)	Evgeni Malkin (A)	C
72	(Sweden)	Patric Hornqvist	RW
81	(United States)	Phil Kessel	RW
87	(Canada)	Sidney Crosby (C)	C
Head coach: (United States) Mike Sullivan

Marc-Andre Fleury and Steve Mason dressed as the back-up goaltenders. Neither entered the game.

=== Scratches ===
- Philadelphia Flyers: Michael Del Zotto, Roman Lyubimov, Nick Schultz
- Pittsburgh Penguins: Kris Letang, Steve Oleksy, Carter Rowney

=== Officials ===
- Referees — Eric Furlatt, Ian Walsh
- Linesmen — Brad Kovachik, Derek Amell
