= 2022 NHL Stadium Series =

Outdoor National Hockey League game

	1	2	3	Total
Tampa Bay Lightning	0	2	1	3
Nashville Predators	1	0	1	2
- Date: February 26, 2022
- Venue: Nissan Stadium
- City: Nashville
- Attendance: 68,619

The 2022 NHL Stadium Series was an outdoor regular season National Hockey League (NHL) game, part of the Stadium Series of games. The game took place on February 26, 2022, at Nissan Stadium in Nashville, Tennessee, with the Nashville Predators hosting the Tampa Bay Lightning. This was the first NHL outdoor game for the Lightning and the second for the Predators.

== Background ==
The NHL originally announced on February 15, 2020, that the 2021 Stadium Series would be hosted by the Carolina Hurricanes at Carter–Finley Stadium. After he took majority control of the team in 2018, Hurricanes owner Thomas Dundon made it a goal to have his club play in its first outdoor game. In 2019, Dundon invited NHL Commissioner Gary Bettman to take a tour of Carter–Finley Stadium to see if it was feasible. Before the league could finalize the game, the Hurricanes had to seek additional funding from the local government and other organizations to help offset the cost of hosting the game.

The NHL delayed the start of the 2020–21 season to January 2021, due to the COVID-19 pandemic having forced the 2019–20 playoffs to conclude in late September. On October 22, 2020, the NHL postponed both the 2021 NHL Winter Classic and the 2021 All-Star Game due to "ongoing uncertainty" since both January events rely on fan participation. The decision to further postpone the Stadium Series game was made on December 23.

The Hurricanes later asked the league to move their outdoor game to the 2022–23 season, with team president and general manager Don Waddell stating that he wanted "to assure a safe environment." On June 28, 2021, the league announced that the 2022 game would instead take place at Nissan Stadium in Nashville, Tennessee, with the Nashville Predators hosting to the Tampa Bay Lightning.

== Game summary ==
The Tampa Bay Lightning defeated the Nashville Predators 3-2, with Lightning captain Steven Stamkos receiving the first star of the game, with one goal and two assists. At 1:19 of the first period, Ryan Johansen illegally checked Erik Cernak to the head that would result in Cernak not returning for the last two periods of the game and Johansen receiving a minor penalty, reduced from what was originally a major penalty. Tanner Jeannot scored the first goal of the game for the Predators during a power play at 8:20, scoring the only goal of the period. Early in the second period, Brayden Point put the Lightning on the board with a power play goal at 0:58. The Lightning would score again this period on another power play, with Nikita Kucherov scoring at 6:18 to make it 2–1. At 11:31 of the third period, Cal Foote fed the puck to Steven Stamkos who slap shots it into the net, making the score 3–1. Later in the period at 12:29, the Filip Forsberg scores a power play goal to make it 3–2. The Predators could not tie the game with an empty net, and the Lightning prevail with a final score of 3–2. Tampa Bay goalie Andrei Vasilevskiy made 26 saves in the win, while Nashville goalie Juuse Saros made 30 saves. The Stamkos goal was the only even strength goal of the entire game.

Scoring summary
Period	Team	Goal	Assist(s)	Time	Score
1st	NSH	Tanner Jeannot (18) – pp	Philip Tomasino (10), Colton Sissons (16)	8:20	NSH 0-1
2nd	TBL	Brayden Point (20) – pp	Nikita Kucherov (15), Steven Stamkos (33)	0:58	1-1
2nd	TBL	Nikita Kucherov (9) – pp	Victor Hedman (40), Steven Stamkos (34)	6:18	TBL 2-1
3rd	TBL	Steven Stamkos (25)	Cal Foote (5), Alex Killorn (29)	11:31	TBL 3-1
3rd	NSH	Filip Forsberg (27) – pp	Mikael Granlund (33), Ryan Johansen (24)	12:29	TBL 3-2

Number in parentheses represents the player's total in goals or assists to that point of the season

Penalty summary
Period	Team	Player	Penalty	Time	PIM
1st	NSH	Ryan Johansen	Illegal check to head	1:19	2:00
1st	TBL	Mathieu Joseph	High sticking	6:34	2:00
1st	TBL	Patrick Maroon	Fighting – major	9:55	5:00
1st	NSH	Michael McCarron	Fighting – major	9:55	5:00
1st	NSH	Matt Benning	Interference	19:49	2:00
2nd	TBL	Pierre-Edouard Bellemare	Fighting – major	5:06	5:00
2nd	NSH	Ryan Johansen	Fighting – major	5:06	5:00
2nd	NSH	Tanner Jeannot	High sticking	5:15	2:00
2nd	TBL	Ryan McDonagh	Roughing	7:15	2:00
2nd	NSH	Philippe Myers	Tripping	18:35	2:00
3rd	TBL	Pierre-Edouard Bellemare	Interference	6:57	2:00
3rd	TBL	Victor Hedman	Hooking	12:22	2:00

Shots by period
Team	1	2	3	Total
TB	12	13	8	33
NSH	11	5	12	28

Power play opportunities
Team	Goals/Opportunities
Tampa Bay	2 / 4
Nashville	2 / 4

Three star selections
	Team	Player	Statistics
1st	TBL	Steven Stamkos	1 goal, 2 assists
2nd	TBL	Nikita Kucherov	1 goal, 1 assist
3rd	NSH	Juuse Saros	30 saves

== Team rosters ==
Tampa Bay Lightning
#		Player	Position
1	(Canada)	Brian Elliott	G
7	(Canada)	Mathieu Joseph	RW
10	(Canada)	Corey Perry	RW
14	(United States)	Patrick Maroon	LW
16	(Canada)	Taylor Raddysh	RW
17	(Canada)	Alex Killorn	LW
18	(Czech Republic)	Ondrej Palat	LW
21	(Canada)	Brayden Point	C
27	(United States)	Ryan McDonagh (A)	D
41	(France)	Pierre Edouard Bellemare	LW
44	(Czech Republic)	Jan Rutta	D
52	(Canada)	Cal Foote	D
71	(Canada)	Anthony Cirelli	C
77	(Sweden)	Victor Hedman (A)	D
79	(United States)	Ross Colton	C
81	(Slovakia)	Erik Cernak	D
86	(Russia)	Nikita Kucherov	RW
88	(Russia)	Andrei Vasilevskiy	G
91	(Canada)	Steven Stamkos (C)	C
98	(Russia)	Mikhail Sergachev	D
Head coach: (Canada) Jon Cooper

Nashville Predators
#		Player	Position
5	(Canada)	Matt Benning	D
9	(Sweden)	Filip Forsberg	LW
10	(Canada)	Colton Sissons	C
11	(United States)	Luke Kunin	C
13	(Russia)	Yakov Trenin	C
14	(Sweden)	Mattias Ekholm (A)	D
17	(Canada)	Ben Harpur	D
24	(Canada)	Matt Luff	RW
26	(Canada)	Philip Tomasino	C
28	(Finland)	Eeli Tolvanen	RW
33	(Czech Republic)	David Rittich	G
47	(United States)	Michael McCarron	RW
55	(Canada)	Philippe Myers	D
57	(Canada)	Dante Fabbro	D
59	(Switzerland)	Roman Josi (C)	D
64	(Finland)	Mikael Granlund (A)	C
74	(Finland)	Juuse Saros	G
84	(Canada)	Tanner Jeannot	LW
92	(Canada)	Ryan Johansen	C
95	(Canada)	Matt Duchene	C
Head coach: (United States) John Hynes

Brian Elliott and David Rittich dressed as the back-up goaltenders. Neither entered the game.

=== Scratches ===
- Tampa Bay Lightning: Boris Katchouk, Andre Sustr
- Nashville Predators: Mark Borowiecki, Alexandre Carrier, Matt Tennyson

== Entertainment ==
Country singer Dustin Lynch performed the song "Party Mode" during team introductions. He was accompanied by the Vanderbilt Spirit dance team. Singer Jessie James Decker sang the national anthem. The ceremonial puck drop was conducted by Titans alumni players Brett Kern and Taylor Lewan along with Predators alumni player Pekka Rinne. Country singers Miranda Lambert and Dierks Bentley performed during the first intermission. Dierks Bentley performed the songs "Burning Man" and "I Hold On". Miranda Lambert performed the songs "Drunk (And I Don't Wanna Go Home)" and "Kerosene". Bentley and Lambert also sang the song "Gimme All Your Lovin'" together in a duet.

== Broadcasting ==
The game was broadcast nationally in the United States by TNT. With it being scheduled for a Saturday night, the game will air north of the border under the Hockey Night in Canada banner on Sportsnet.
