= NHL Stadium Series =

Series of regular season outdoor games played in the National Hockey League

National Hockey League
- First played: January 25, 2014
- Times held: 17
- Teams participated: 19
- Most appearances: 3: Los Angeles Kings; New York Rangers; Philadelphia Flyers; Pittsburgh Penguins
- Most wins: 3: New York Rangers
- Most recent: February 1, 2026
- Most recent winner: Tampa Bay Lightning

The Stadium Series is one of the series of regular season outdoor games played in the National Hockey League (NHL). This event is distinct from the NHL's other two series of outdoor games, the NHL Winter Classic, played in a different NHL city every year, and the NHL Heritage Classic (played occasionally at different Canadian stadiums). Games in the Stadium Series are usually played in February or early March, and are typically played in either NFL or college football stadiums in the United States when both leagues are in their offseason. In the past, MLB ballparks in the United States were also used, though it has been mainly utilized for the Winter Classic. The first Stadium Series was held in 2014 and consisted of seven teams participating in four games held in three venues; this was also the only Stadium Series to have taken place in January. Since 2015, only one Stadium Series game has been played each season, except in 2016 and in 2024, when two games were held.

== List of NHL Stadium Series ==
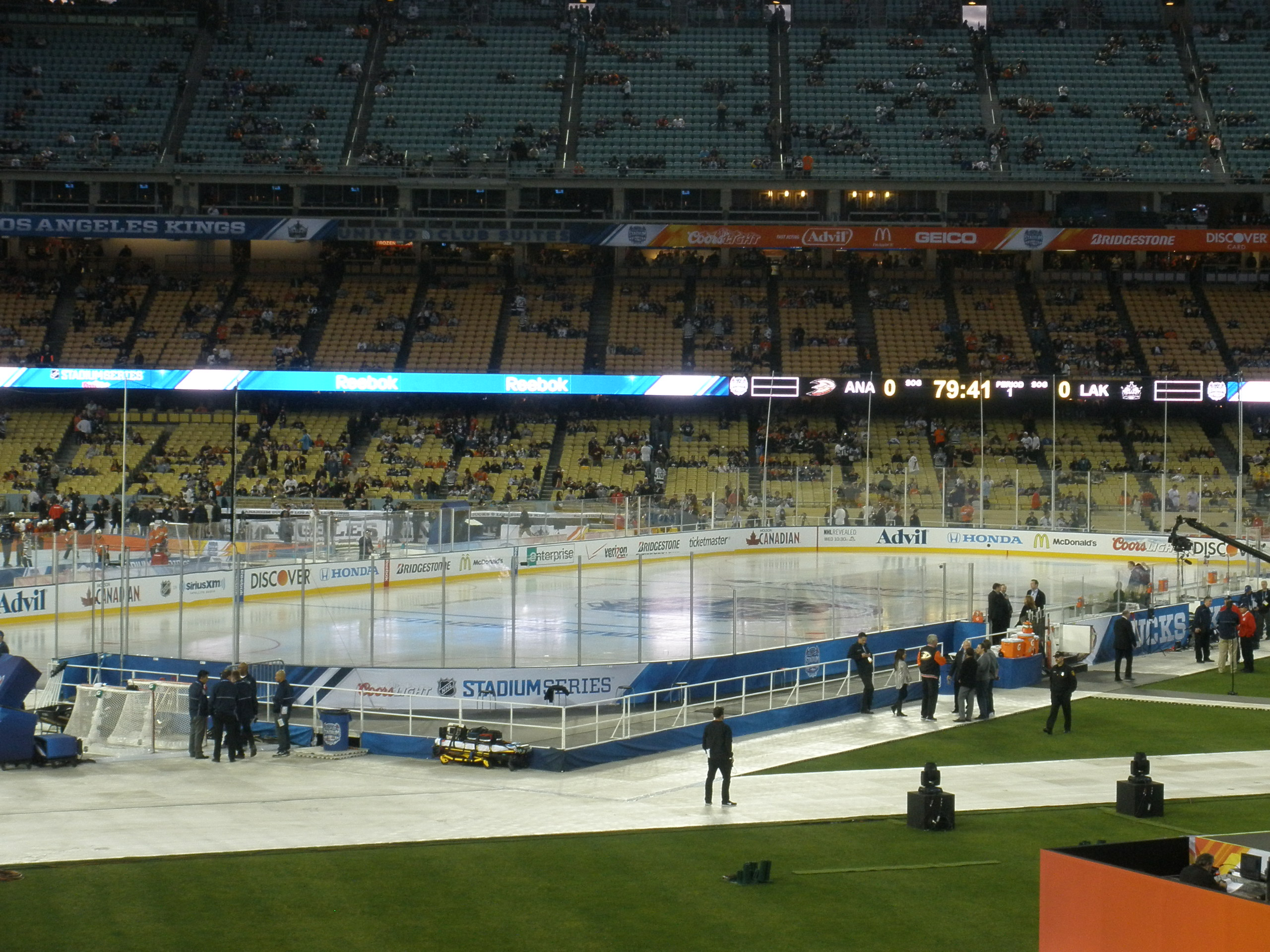
Dodger Stadium being prepped for the NHL's inaugural game of the Stadium Series in January 2014

- **Bolded** teams denote winners
- Italicized games are yet to be played

No.	Year	Date	Primary team at venue	Venue	Location	Visiting team	Home team	Score	Attendance
1st	2014	January 25	Los Angeles Dodgers	Dodger Stadium	Los Angeles, California	**Anaheim Ducks**	Los Angeles Kings	3–0	54,099
1st	2014	January 26	New York Yankees	Yankee Stadium	New York City, New York	**New York Rangers**	New Jersey Devils	7–3	50,105
1st	2014	January 29	New York Yankees	Yankee Stadium	New York City, New York	**New York Rangers**	New York Islanders	2–1	50,027
1st	2014	March 1	Chicago Bears	Soldier Field	Chicago, Illinois	Pittsburgh Penguins	**Chicago Blackhawks**	1–5	62,921
2nd	2015	February 21	San Francisco 49ers	Levi's Stadium	Santa Clara, California	**Los Angeles Kings**	San Jose Sharks	2–1	70,205
3rd	2016	February 21	Minnesota Golden Gophers	TCF Bank Stadium	Minneapolis, Minnesota	Chicago Blackhawks	**Minnesota Wild**	1–6	50,426
3rd	2016	February 27	Colorado Rockies	Coors Field	Denver, Colorado	**Detroit Red Wings**	Colorado Avalanche	5–3	50,095
4th	2017	February 25	Pittsburgh Steelers	Heinz Field	Pittsburgh, Pennsylvania	Philadelphia Flyers	**Pittsburgh Penguins**	2–4	67,318
5th	2018	March 3	Navy Midshipmen	Navy–Marine Corps Memorial Stadium	Annapolis, Maryland	Toronto Maple Leafs	**Washington Capitals**	2–5	29,516
6th	2019	February 23	Philadelphia Eagles	Lincoln Financial Field	Philadelphia, Pennsylvania	Pittsburgh Penguins	**Philadelphia Flyers**	3–4 (OT)	69,620
7th	2020	February 15	Air Force Falcons	Falcon Stadium	Air Force Academy, Colorado	**Los Angeles Kings**	Colorado Avalanche	3–1	43,574
8th	2022	February 26	Tennessee Titans	Nissan Stadium	Nashville, Tennessee	**Tampa Bay Lightning**	Nashville Predators	3–2	68,619
9th	2023	February 18	NC State Wolfpack	Carter–Finley Stadium	Raleigh, North Carolina	Washington Capitals	**Carolina Hurricanes**	1–4	56,961
10th	2024	February 17	New York Giants; New York Jets	MetLife Stadium	East Rutherford, New Jersey	Philadelphia Flyers	**New Jersey Devils**	3–6	70,328
10th	2024	February 18	New York Giants; New York Jets	MetLife Stadium	East Rutherford, New Jersey	**New York Rangers**	New York Islanders	6–5 (OT)	79,690
11th	2025	March 1	Ohio State Buckeyes	Ohio Stadium	Columbus, Ohio	Detroit Red Wings	**Columbus Blue Jackets**	3–5	94,751
12th	2026	February 1	Tampa Bay Buccaneers	Raymond James Stadium	Tampa, Florida	Boston Bruins	**Tampa Bay Lightning**	5–6 (SO)	64,617
13th	2027	February 20	Dallas Cowboys	AT&T Stadium	Arlington, Texas	Vegas Golden Knights	Dallas Stars	TBD	TBA

== Appearances ==
Team	Appearances	Last	Wins	Losses
New York Rangers	3	2024	3	0
Los Angeles Kings	3	2020	2	1
Pittsburgh Penguins	3	2019	1	2
Philadelphia Flyers	3	2024	1	2
Tampa Bay Lightning	2	2026	2	0
Chicago Blackhawks	2	2016	1	1
Washington Capitals	2	2023	1	1
New Jersey Devils	2	2024	1	1
Detroit Red Wings	2	2025	1	1
Colorado Avalanche	2	2020	0	2
New York Islanders	2	2024	0	2
Anaheim Ducks	1	2014	1	0
Minnesota Wild	1	2016	1	0
Carolina Hurricanes	1	2023	1	0
Columbus Blue Jackets	1	2025	1	0
San Jose Sharks	1	2015	0	1
Toronto Maple Leafs	1	2018	0	1
Nashville Predators	1	2022	0	1
Boston Bruins	1	2026	0	1

=== Winning and losing teams ===
Teams	Win	Loss	Total	Year(s) won	Year(s) lost
New York Rangers	3	0	3	2014, 2014, 2024	
Los Angeles Kings	2	1	3	2015, 2020	2014
Tampa Bay Lightning	2	0	2	2022, 2026	
Pittsburgh Penguins	1	2	3	2017	2014, 2019
Philadelphia Flyers	1	2	3	2019	2017, 2024
Chicago Blackhawks	1	1	2	2014	2016
Detroit Red Wings	1	1	2	2016	2025
Washington Capitals	1	1	2	2018	2023
New Jersey Devils	1	1	2	2024	2014
Anaheim Ducks	1	0	1	2014	
Minnesota Wild	1	0	1	2016	
Carolina Hurricanes	1	0	1	2023	
Columbus Blue Jackets	1	0	1	2025	
New York Islanders	0	2	2		2014, 2024
Colorado Avalanche	0	2	2		2016, 2020
San Jose Sharks	0	1	1		2015
Toronto Maple Leafs	0	1	1		2018
Nashville Predators	0	1	1		2022
Boston Bruins	0	1	1		2026

== Uniforms ==
The uniforms worn in the Stadium Series are unique in that they feature enlarged logos, letters and numbers in order to increase visibility for spectators who sit in the upper deck seats (as the Stadium Series is typically played in NFL or college football stadiums). Whereas the Winter Classic and Heritage Classic focused on vintage hockey uniform designs intended on celebrating ice hockey history, the Stadium Series focused on more futuristic and experimental looks showcasing the modernization of the sport.

While a majority of the participating teams were able to create radically new looks for the event, the New Jersey Devils in the 2014 Stadium Series refused to do so, instead wearing their throwback red and green uniforms during the game. This was due to general manager Lou Lamoriello's refusal to adopt the third jersey trend at the time. However, for their 2024 Stadium Series appearance, the Devils wore a different uniform design akin to the game itself, having embraced the third jersey concept following Lamoriello's departure in 2015.

To date, only two teams have promoted its Stadium Series uniform to full third jersey status: the New York Islanders' blue-and-chrome "NY" uniform from the 2014 Stadium Series (used only in the 2014–15 season), and the Philadelphia Flyers' black uniform from the 2017 Stadium Series (beginning in the 2018–19 season until the 2025-26 season). Meanwhile, the Carolina Hurricanes' 2023 Stadium Series uniform served as the inspiration for the team's road uniform they started wearing in the 2025–26 season.

== Broadcasters ==
=== United States ===
In the United States, the Stadium Series was broadcast on NBC Sports from 2014 to 2020, as they held the U.S. national NHL rights during that period. NBC aired the majority of the Stadium Series games on Saturday nights; the exceptions being the 2014 Ducks–Kings game in Dodger Stadium (aired on NBCSN), the 2014 Islanders–Rangers game in Yankee Stadium (held on Wednesday night on NBCSN), and the 2015 Kings–Sharks game in Levi's Stadium (aired on NBCSN).

From 2022 to 2028, the U.S. national rights are split between the ESPN family of networks and TNT, with the former producing the weekend Hockey Saturday package on ABC. Scheduling conflicts have largely dictated which of the two broadcasters have aired Stadium Series games. The 2022 game aired on TNT, marking a return to cable television for the first time since 2015, while ABC was committed to airing the NBA on that day. In 2023 and 2024, the Stadium Series was scheduled at the same time as TNT's broadcasts of NBA All-Star Weekend, thus ABC has covered these games, with the 2023 game originally scheduled to air on ESPN before being flexed to ABC. The 2025 game was moved to ESPN due to prior NBA and AEW commitments by both ABC and TNT respectively. The 2026 game, which falls on the Sunday before Super Bowl LX (and is traditionally scheduled a Pro Bowl week, though the 2026 Pro Bowl Games was moved to Tuesday, February 3), is slated to air on ESPN, with ABC instead committing to a college basketball doubleheader while the Stadium Series will serve as a lead-out program to ESPN's NBA coverage. After a two-year absence, the Stadium Series will return to ABC in 2027.

=== Canada ===
In Canada, the first two 2014 Stadium Series games were aired on CBC, while TSN simulcast NBCSN's broadcast of the Islanders–Rangers game. The Penguins–Blackhawks game did not air in Canada due to CBC's prior commitment to broadcast a Canadiens–Maple Leafs game. Since the 2014–15 season, Rogers Sports & Media has been the sole rightsholder of NHL national games in Canada, taking over Hockey Night in Canada in a sublicensing agreement with CBC. However, with the exception of the 2015 game, Sportsnet has generally simulcast the American broadcast feed of the Stadium Series. They would still provide their own broadcast crew if a Canadian team is involved, as was the case in 2018 with the Maple Leafs–Capitals game.
