= NHL outdoor games =

Professional ice hockey games played outdoors

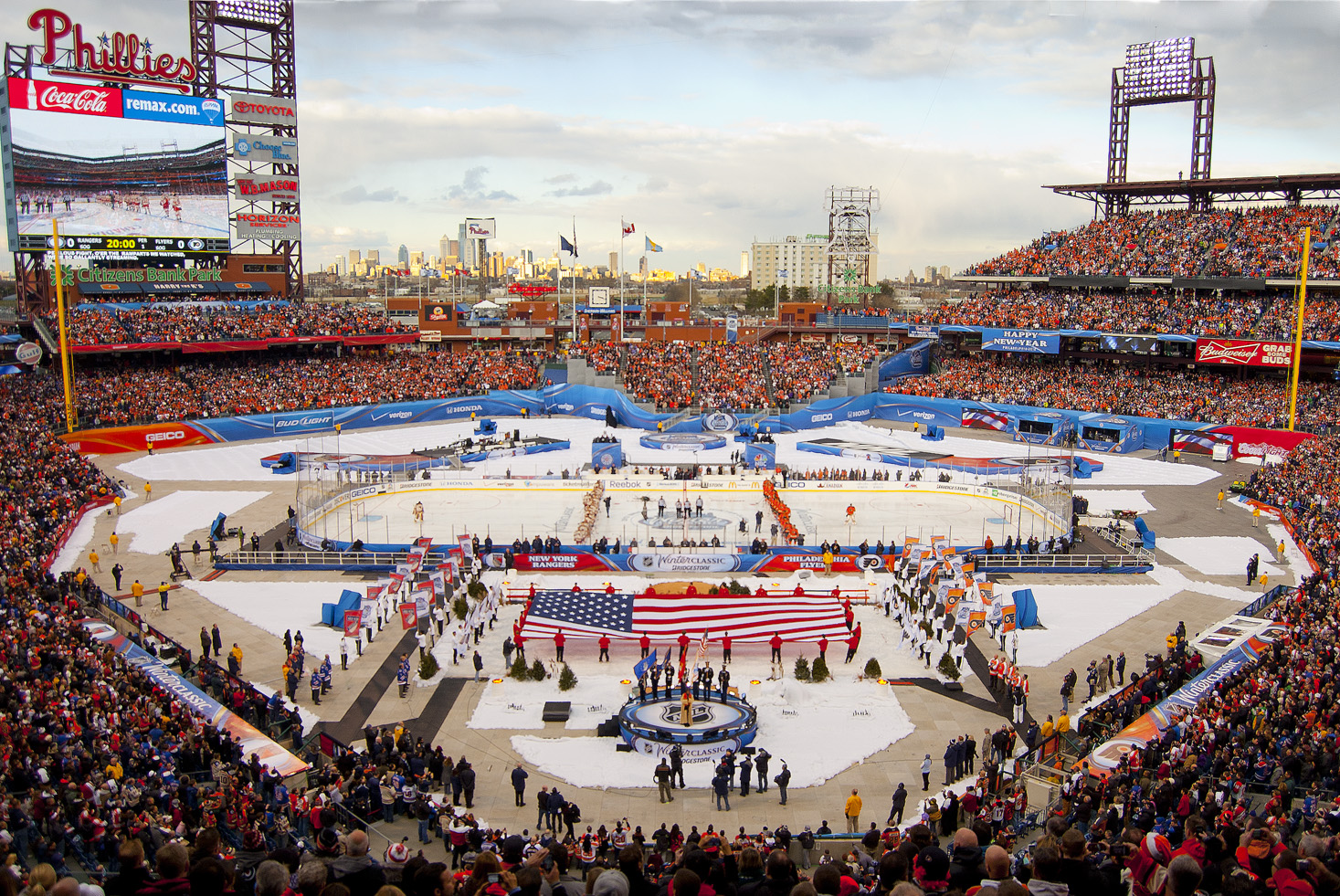
The 2012 Winter Classic at Citizens Bank Park in Philadelphia

The National Hockey League (NHL) first held an outdoor ice hockey game during the 2003–04 season, and has scheduled at least one such game per season since 2007–08.

The NHL primarily uses three brands for outdoor games – Heritage Classic, Winter Classic, and Stadium Series. The 2003 Heritage Classic between the Edmonton Oilers and Montreal Canadiens was the first outdoor regular season game in NHL history. The Heritage Classic has since been held infrequently in football stadiums in Canada, featuring match-ups solely between Canadian teams, until the Buffalo Sabres made their appearance in the 2022 Heritage Classic. The annual Winter Classic, held on or around New Year's Day in football or baseball stadiums near NHL home markets in the United States, began with the 2008 game between the Pittsburgh Penguins and the Buffalo Sabres. The NHL then started the Stadium Series in 2014 for additional outdoor games in the United States. The number of Stadium Series games has varied per season (four in 2014, one in 2015, two in 2016, and at least one per season since 2017). Both the Winter Classic and the Stadium Series featured match-ups solely between American teams until the Toronto Maple Leafs appeared in both the 2014 Winter Classic and 2018 Stadium Series.

To celebrate the NHL's 100-year anniversary in 2017, the league scheduled two special outdoor games – the NHL Centennial Classic between the Detroit Red Wings and Toronto Maple Leafs on January 1 (during the season 2016–17 season) to kick off the year, and then the NHL 100 Classic on December 16 (during the 2017–18 season) between the Montreal Canadiens and Ottawa Senators to commemorate the league's first game, having taken place exactly 100 years before, between the same contenders (the first game was initially played by the Canadiens and original Ottawa Senators). The three teams involved in said honorific matches constitute three of the league's Original Six members (Detroit Red Wings, Toronto Maple Leafs and Montreal Canadiens). Then, due to the COVID-19 pandemic in 2021, the league held the NHL Outdoors at Lake Tahoe, two outdoor games played without spectators.

Prior to 2003, NHL teams had been involved in at least three outdoor exhibitions. Two of these came in the 1950s and were effectively informal scrimmages; in 1954, the Detroit Red Wings visited Marquette Branch Prison and played a match against the prison inmates in a fenced-off, open air ice rink, while in 1956, the Boston Bruins played a game against several local teams in Bay Roberts, Newfoundland. In neither case was a formal game structure maintained or score kept, as the NHL teams hopelessly outmatched the hosts. In 1991, the Los Angeles Kings and New York Rangers played a pre-season game outside Caesars Palace in Paradise, Nevada, in the first official NHL-sanctioned outdoor contest.

The NHL's outdoor series have proven popular with fans and have led to numerous attendance records. The 2003 Heritage Classic drew 57,167 fans, a league record that stood until 71,217 fans in Orchard Park, New York, set another NHL record in the inaugural Winter Classic in 2008. The 2014 Winter Classic, between the Toronto Maple Leafs and Detroit Red Wings drew 105,491 fans, the current NHL record.

== History ==
The first outdoor game on record to feature an NHL team was attempted on February 2, 1954. The Detroit Red Wings played an exhibition game on an outdoor ice surface, in 21 °F (−6 °C) degree weather, against the Marquette Pirates, an athletic club composed of inmates at Michigan's Marquette Branch Prison. The game, and the Pirates club, was allegedly organized as a way for Red Wings manager Jack Adams to make good with two convicted The Mafia members incarcerated at the prison. By the end of the first period alone, the Red Wings had amassed an 18–0 score against the prisoners; score keeping was abandoned after that point and the rest of the game effectively became an informal scrimmage.

Two years after the 1954 prison match, the Boston Bruins went on a postseason barnstorm of Atlantic Canada in April 1956, which included a stop in Bay Roberts, Newfoundland. On April 9, 1956, the Bruins played an exhibition game against teams from the Conception Bay North Hockey League on an outdoor artificial ice surface, under similar rules to those of the 1954 prison match. Four teams each played one period against the Bruins who dominated the game. Only one goal was scored on Terry Sawchuk by the local teams.

During their time at the Civic Arena, the Pittsburgh Penguins could have theoretically hosted an outdoor NHL game due to the arena having a retractable roof as the arena was originally built for the Pittsburgh Civic Light Opera, who only stayed at the arena until 1973. However, the roof was always closed during ice hockey games with both the Penguins and their American Hockey League (AHL) predecessors, the Pittsburgh Hornets, whom the Penguins replaced upon the 1967 NHL expansion. The roof was permanently closed after 1994 when the Penguins replaced the center scoreboard.

The first outdoor game between two NHL teams (and the first played to completion) was an official pre-season match-up on September 27, 1991. The game took place in the parking lot of Caesars Palace in Paradise, Nevada, and featured the Los Angeles Kings and New York Rangers. The process of keeping the ice cool in the desert heat required three times as much coolant as a standard NHL rink. There were few problems despite temperatures that reached 95 °F (35 °C) during the day and a game time temperature of 80 °F (27 °C). During the contest grasshoppers began to jump onto the ice, where they would freeze or drown in water used to maintain the ice, and by the end of the second period the ice was littered with the bugs. Nearly 14,000 fans watched the Kings defeat the Rangers 5–2. From 1997 to 2016, the Los Angeles Kings returned to the Las Vegas Valley to play an annual indoors pre-season game as part of the Frozen Fury series. In 2016, Las Vegas area obtained its own NHL franchise and the series was moved to Salt Lake City, before it was canceled altogether due to the arrival of the Utah Mammoth in 2024.

The first regular season outdoor game in the history of the NHL took place on November 22, 2003, at Edmonton's Commonwealth Stadium, when the Edmonton Oilers played the Montreal Canadiens in the 2003 Heritage Classic. The Oilers had suggested the idea of hosting an outdoor game as early as the mid-1980s, but the genesis of the 2003 event was the "Cold War" outdoor game played two years prior between Michigan State University and the University of Michigan.

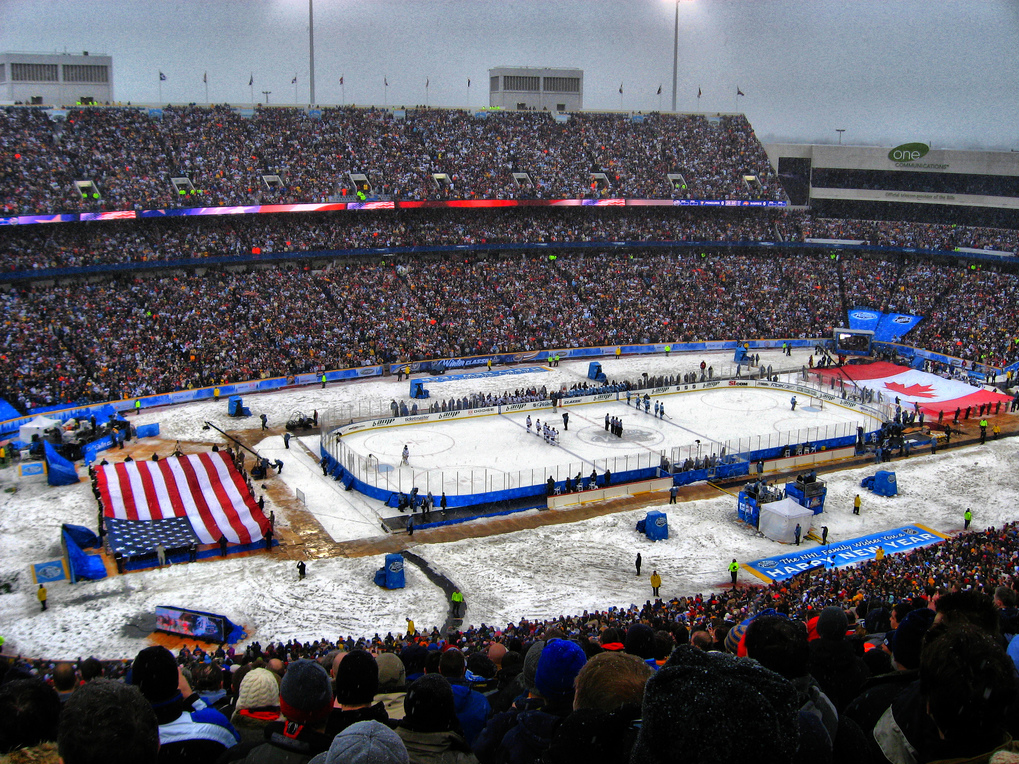
The inaugural Winter Classic was played in 2008 at Ralph Wilson Stadium in Orchard Park, New York

In 2005, NBC Sports executive vice president Jon Miller then pitched the concept of an annual outdoor game as a television event to the NHL, "but they didn't find the concept workable." In December 2006, Miller found an ally in then-league executive vice president/business and media John Collins, who embraced the idea. This led to the inaugural Winter Classic game on January 1, 2008, with the Pittsburgh Penguins visiting the Buffalo Sabres at Ralph Wilson Stadium.

On May 1, 2013, the NHL announced that the Chicago Blackhawks would host the Pittsburgh Penguins at Soldier Field in Chicago on March 1, 2014, as part of a new series of outdoor games called the Stadium Series. By the end of May 2013, the NHL had scheduled a record six outdoor NHL games for the 2013–14 season – one Winter Classic, one Heritage Classic, and four Stadium Series games.

In scheduling outdoor games in the New York metropolitan area that feature the New York Rangers (first occurring during two of the four 2014 Stadium Series games, and subsequently the 2018 Winter Classic), the team has always been designated as the "away" team. This is to maintain the property tax-exempt status of the Rangers' home arena, Madison Square Garden (MSG). The tax exemption stipulates that it only applies if the Rangers do not "cease playing" home games at the arena, generally interpreted as playing any "home" game outside of it. By designating the Rangers as the "away" team and the Buffalo Sabres as the "home" team in the 2018 Winter Classic at Citi Field in the New York City borough of Queens, it would save MSG from paying more than $40 million in property taxes.

Up until 2013, NHL's outdoor games were held exclusively in Canada and in the Midwest and Northeast United States. That changed in the 2014 Stadium Series when the Los Angeles Kings became the first West Coast team to host a regular season outdoor game when they faced their in-city rival, the Anaheim Ducks, at Dodger Stadium in Los Angeles on January 25, 2014. The San Jose Sharks followed suit, hosting their archrival Kings in the 2015 Stadium Series at Levi's Stadium in Santa Clara, California. The first outdoor game to take place in a Southern state took place in the 2020 Winter Classic when the Dallas Stars hosted the Nashville Predators at the Cotton Bowl in Dallas.

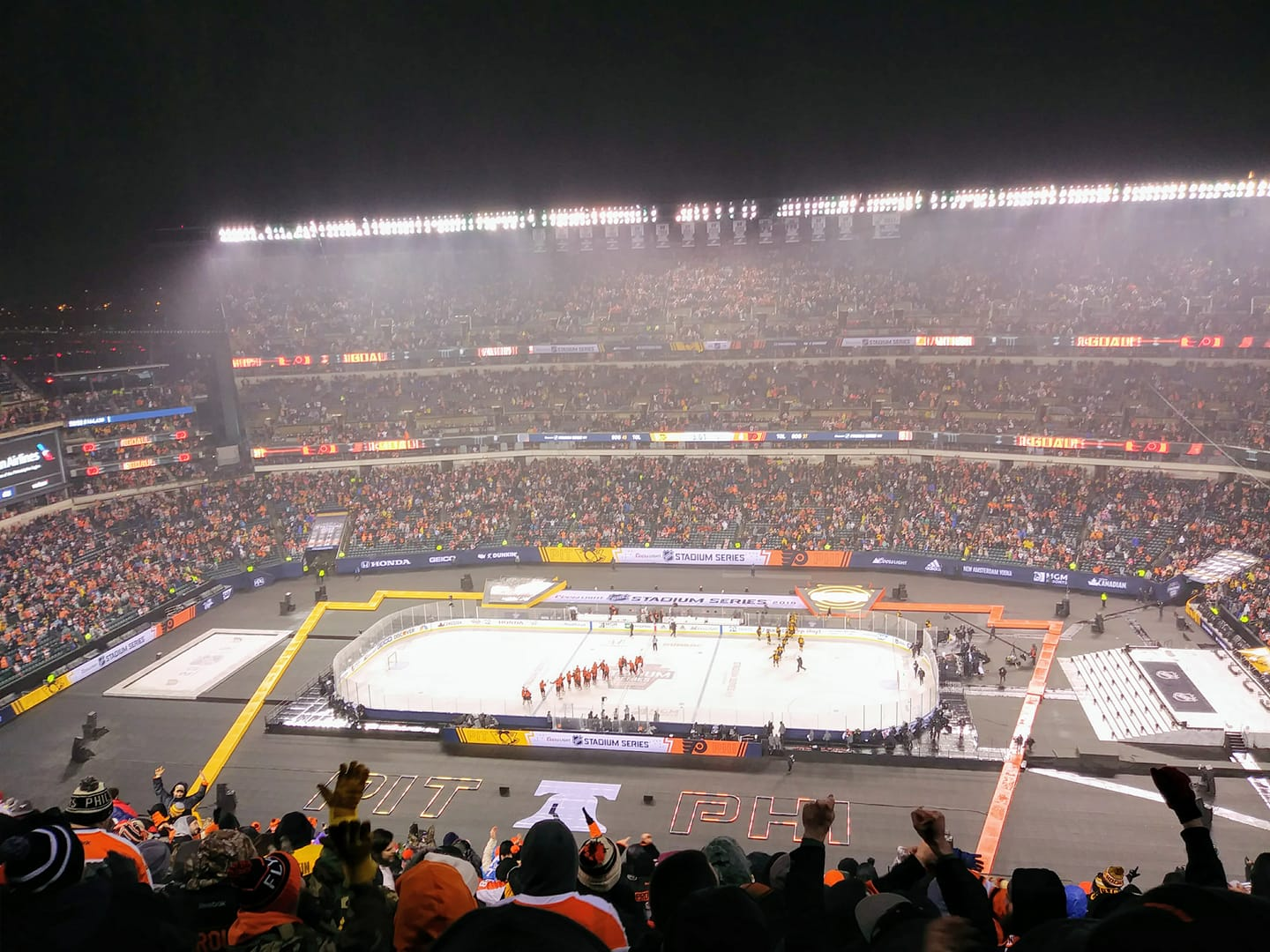
The 2019 Stadium Series was held at Lincoln Financial Field in Philadelphia

In 2016, the Penguins and the Philadelphia Flyers worked out an agreement to play a home-and-home series of outdoors games. The two archrivals played the 2017 Stadium Series game at Heinz Field in Pittsburgh, and then played the 2019 Stadium Series game at Lincoln Financial Field in Philadelphia. The two teams had also discussed playing a neutral site game at Beaver Stadium at State College, Pennsylvania, but this did not materialize, due mainly to concerns about Beaver Stadium's plumbing being unable to withstand an event in winter. On March 6, 2016, the NHL officially announced that the Winnipeg Jets will host the Oilers in the 2016 Heritage Classic during the 2016–17 season, held on October 23, 2016.

To celebrate the NHL's 100-year in 2017, the league held two special outdoor games. The first, branded as the Centennial Classic, between the Detroit Red Wings and Toronto Maple Leafs, was held on January 1 (during the 2016–17 season) to kick off the year. The second, branded as the NHL 100 Classic, was held on December 16 (during the 2017–18 season) between the Montreal Canadiens and Ottawa Senators.

When the 2018 Stadium Series at Navy–Marine Corps Memorial Stadium at the U.S. Naval Academy was announced, NHL commissioner Gary Bettman said that it was the start of a unique partnership with the U.S. military in which the league planned to host outdoor games at military service academies around the United States. The 2020 Stadium Series was held at Falcon Stadium at the U.S. Air Force Academy on February 15, 2020.

In 2021, the NHL announced the creation of a two-game series, the NHL Outdoors at Lake Tahoe, to function as the replacement for the canceled outdoor games of the 2020–21 season. In view of the COVID-19 pandemic, fans would not be allowed at the games and instead the games would serve as a made-for-television event intended to simulate pond hockey.

=== Rule differences ===
The NHL outdoor games have additional weather-related rules, including:

- At the discretion of the NHL commissioner, a game may be subject to temporary stoppages due to unplayable weather conditions. The period and game format may then be modified to accommodate those conditions.
- If there are high winds or other weather conditions that may give the team at one end an unfair advantage, a "hard whistle" will be signaled at the 10:00 minute mark of the third period, and then at the 2:30 minute mark of overtime (if necessary), stopping play immediately and the teams will switch sides.
- During shootouts, both teams may choose to defend the same goal.
- If a game is stopped permanently once two periods have been played, it can then be declared a completed official game. If the score is still tied however, the teams will still hold a shootout, whether at the same outdoor rink or at a different venue at a later date.

The 2008 Winter Classic was the first game to use "hard whistle" stoppages during the third period and overtime, and to have the teams defend the same goal during the shootout.

The 2011 Winter Classic was delayed from its original 1:00 p.m. start time to 8:00 p.m. due to warm temperatures and rain in the forecast. The start time of the 2012 Winter Classic was also delayed two hours due to the sun hitting the ice. Sunlight also adversely affected the ice conditions of the first game of the NHL Outdoors at Lake Tahoe, causing the start of the second period to be delayed for several hours. The start time of the second Lake Tahoe game was also delayed because of the conditions.

=== Hosting statistics ===
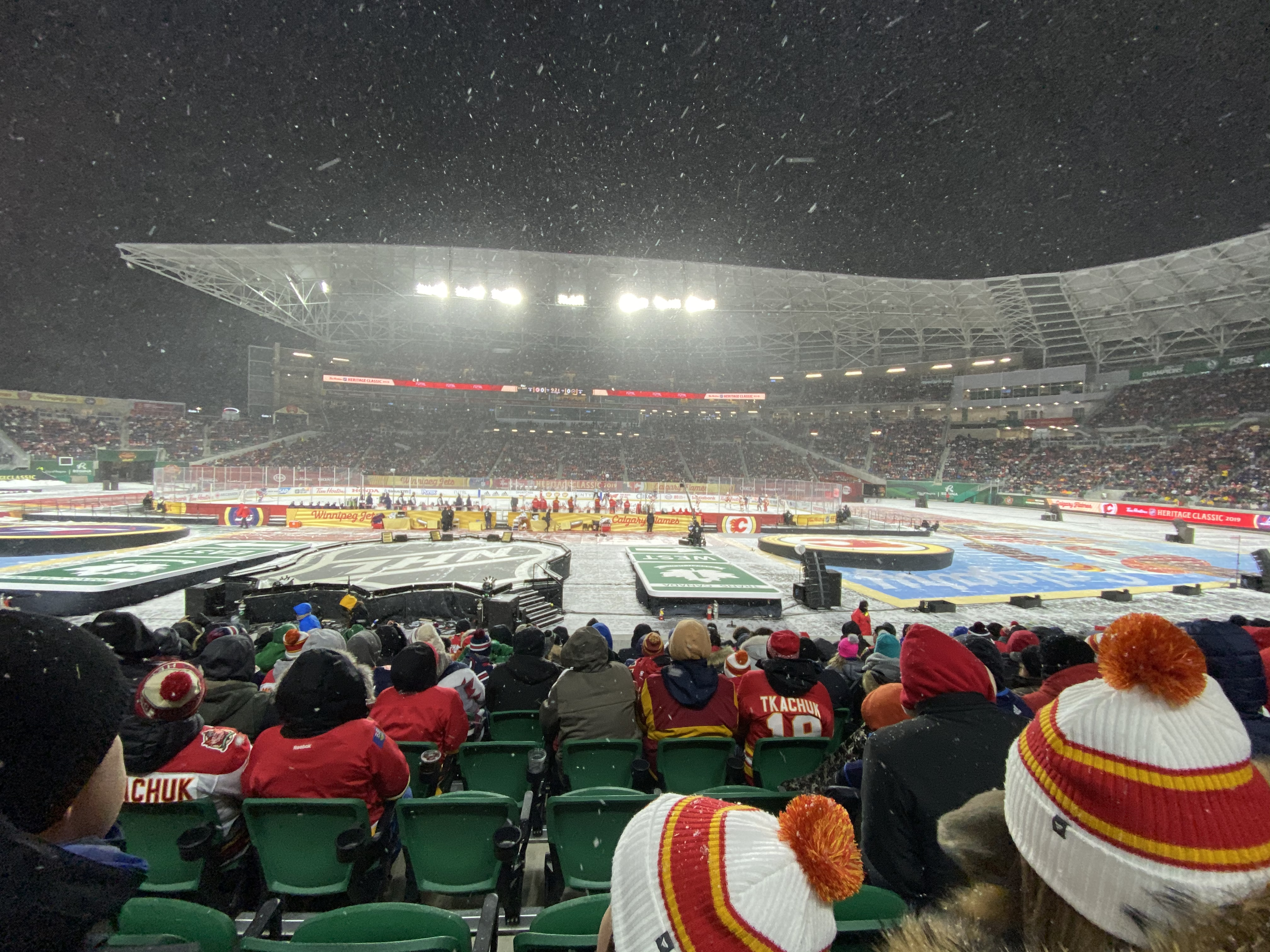
The 2019 Heritage Classic at Mosaic Stadium in Regina, Saskatchewan, was the first Heritage Classic held outside the locales the participants are based in

As of February 2026:

- Until 2027, 31 of the NHL's 32 teams have participated in an outdoor regular season game with Utah being the only team that has never been selected.
- 18 teams have played more than one game.
- Chicago has appeared in seven outdoor games. This is the most of any team. Their record is one win and six losses.
- 22 metropolitan areas (out of 29 represented among the league's 32 teams) have hosted outdoor regulation games. In addition to the six metropolitan areas represented by teams that have not played in any outdoor games, Montreal has played in outdoor games but has yet to host any themselves.
- New York City, Massachusetts and Chicago/Northern Indiana have each hosted three games. Maryland–DC, Colorado, Pittsburgh, Minneapolis-St.Paul and Winnipeg/Eastern Prairies have each hosted twice.
- Yankee Stadium, Fenway Park, Heinz Field, and Commonwealth Stadium will have each hosted two games.
- In the 2019 Heritage Classic, Saskatchewan (a province that has been a longshot candidate for NHL expansion for decades) became the first fully neutral-site territory to host an outdoor regular season game, with Winnipeg Jets as the designated home team (their second).
- During the 2021 NHL Outdoors at Lake Tahoe when two games were played, Vegas played in the first contest against Colorado. The second game was between Philadelphia and Boston.

=== Canceled and postponed games ===
The Dallas Stars had originally been scheduled to play a stadium game at Houston's Reliant Stadium during their 2011–12 pre-season, but this game was ultimately canceled.

The 2013 Winter Classic was originally scheduled to be contested at Michigan Stadium between the Detroit Red Wings and Toronto Maple Leafs. However, due to the 2012–13 NHL lockout resulting in an abbreviated 2012–13 season, this Winter Classic matchup at Michigan Stadium was postponed and would be held during the following season instead.

The Winnipeg Jets announced in 2013 that they had reached an agreement with the NHL to host a fourth Heritage Classic at Investors Group Field, the home of the Canadian Football League's Winnipeg Blue Bombers, which they hoped to hold during the team's fifth anniversary in 2015–16. However, a disagreement occurred between the NHL and the Winnipeg Blue Bombers over the game's exact date – the league wanted it held in December 2015, while the football team became concerned that this date was too close to the 103rd Grey Cup being held at the stadium on November 29. In January 2015, the Jets announced that they could not reach an agreement to finalize a date for the Heritage Classic during the 2015–16 season and that they were now looking for a new date during the 2016–17 season. On March 6, 2016, the NHL officially announced that the Jets would host the Oilers in the 2016 Heritage Classic during the 2016–17 season, held in October.

For the 2020–21 season, the 2021 Winter Classic was originally planned to take place at Target Field between the St. Louis Blues and the Minnesota Wild, and the Carolina Hurricanes were scheduled to host a Stadium Series game at Carter–Finley Stadium on February 20, 2021. Due to the COVID-19 pandemic delaying the conclusion of the previous season to September 2020 and postponing the start of a shortened 2020–21 season to January 2021, as well as uncertainty about fan attendance because of local health restrictions, the two events were postponed to 2022 at the earliest; an opponent for the Hurricanes was not yet determined at the time the postponement was made. On June 28, 2021, the league confirmed that the Blues and the Wild would play in the 2022 Winter Classic at Target Field, but the Hurricanes asked the league to postpone their outdoor game for another year to at least the 2022–23 season "to assure a safe environment." The Hurricanes would become the first warm-climate Eastern Conference team to host an outdoor game.

== List of NHL outdoor games ==
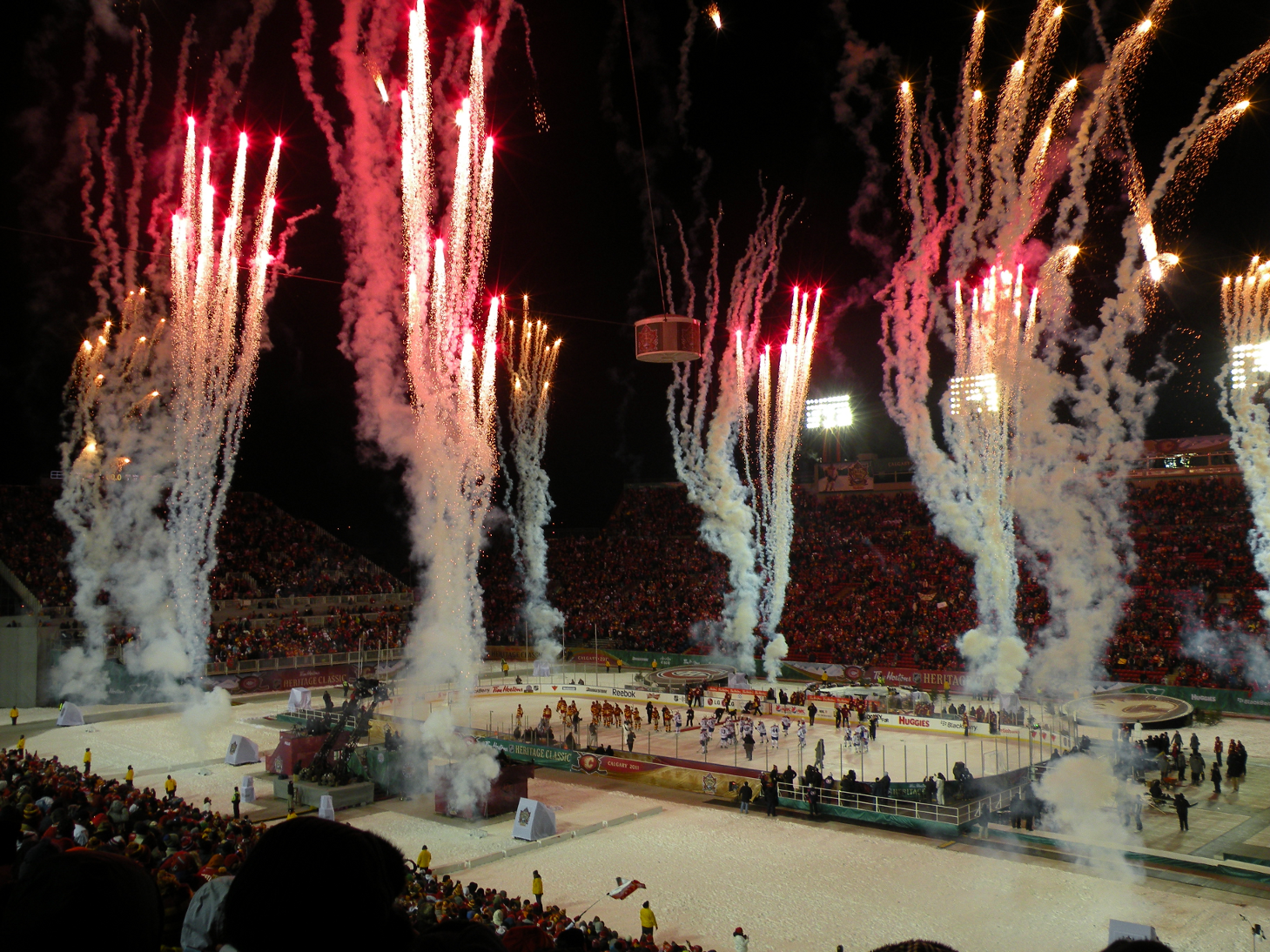
Fireworks after the end of the 2011 Heritage Classic, held at McMahon Stadium in Calgary. The game was the second Heritage Classic held by the NHL.

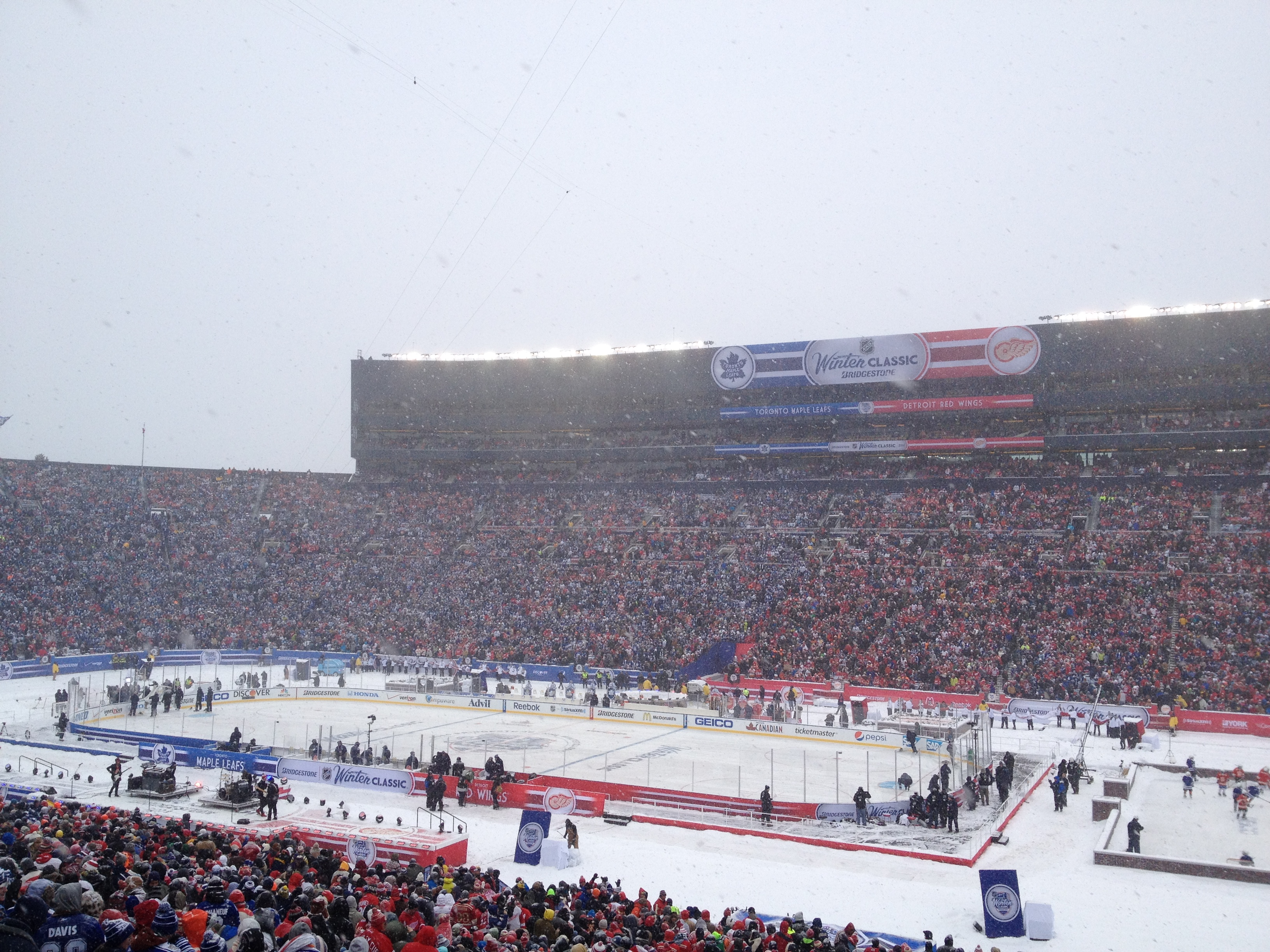
The 2014 Winter Classic was held at Michigan Stadium in Ann Arbor, Michigan. The game saw over 105,000 people in attendance.

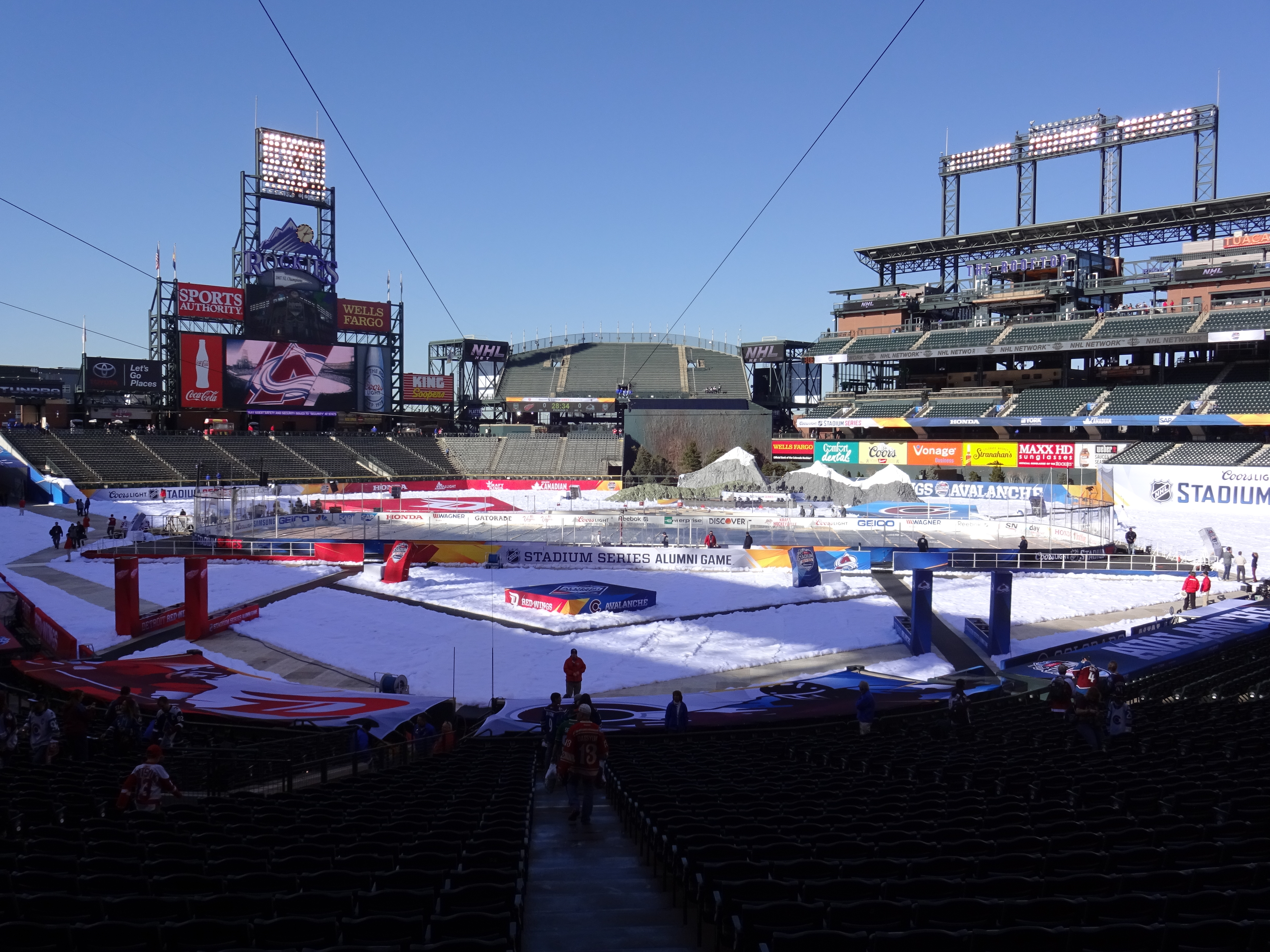
The second game of the 2016 Stadium Series was held at Coors Field in Denver

In the sortable table below, bolded teams denote winners.

Date	Event	Site	Primary team at venue	Away team	Home team	Score	Attendance
February 2, 1954	Exhibition game	Marquette Branch Prison, Marquette, Michigan	Marquette Prison Pirates	**Detroit Red Wings**	Marquette Prison Pirates	—	600
April 9, 1956	Exhibition game	Conception Bay Sports Arena, Bay Roberts, Newfoundland	Local Conception Bay North Hockey League teams	**Boston Bruins**	Bay Roberts, Brigus, Shearstown, Coley's Point (1 period each)	—	—
September 27, 1991	Exhibition game	Caesars Palace, Paradise, Nevada	—	New York Rangers	**Los Angeles Kings**	5–2	13,007
November 22, 2003	Heritage Classic	Commonwealth Stadium, Edmonton, Alberta	Edmonton Eskimos (CFL)	**Montreal Canadiens**	Edmonton Oilers	4–3	57,167
January 1, 2008	Winter Classic	Ralph Wilson Stadium, Orchard Park, New York	Buffalo Bills (NFL)	**Pittsburgh Penguins**	Buffalo Sabres	2–1 (SO)	71,217
January 1, 2009	Winter Classic	Wrigley Field, Chicago, Illinois	Chicago Cubs (MLB)	**Detroit Red Wings**	Chicago Blackhawks	6–4	40,818
January 1, 2010	Winter Classic	Fenway Park, Boston, Massachusetts	Boston Red Sox (MLB)	Philadelphia Flyers	**Boston Bruins**	2–1 (OT)	38,112
January 1, 2011	Winter Classic	Heinz Field, Pittsburgh, Pennsylvania	Pittsburgh Steelers (NFL)	**Washington Capitals**	Pittsburgh Penguins	3–1	68,111
February 20, 2011	Heritage Classic	McMahon Stadium, Calgary, Alberta	Calgary Stampeders (CFL)	Montreal Canadiens	**Calgary Flames**	4–0	41,022
January 2, 2012	Winter Classic	Citizens Bank Park, Philadelphia, Pennsylvania	Philadelphia Phillies (MLB)	**New York Rangers**	Philadelphia Flyers	3–2	46,967
January 1, 2014	Winter Classic	Michigan Stadium, Ann Arbor, Michigan	Michigan Wolverines (NCAA)	**Toronto Maple Leafs**	Detroit Red Wings	3–2 (SO)	105,491
January 25, 2014	Stadium Series	Dodger Stadium, Los Angeles, California	Los Angeles Dodgers (MLB)	**Anaheim Ducks**	Los Angeles Kings	3–0	54,099
January 26, 2014	Stadium Series	Yankee Stadium, Bronx, New York	New York Yankees (MLB)	**New York Rangers**	New Jersey Devils	7–3	50,105
January 29, 2014	Stadium Series	Yankee Stadium, Bronx, New York	New York Yankees (MLB)	**New York Rangers**	New York Islanders	2–1	50,027
March 1, 2014	Stadium Series	Soldier Field, Chicago, Illinois	Chicago Bears (NFL)	Pittsburgh Penguins	**Chicago Blackhawks**	5–1	62,921
March 2, 2014†	Heritage Classic	BC Place, Vancouver, British Columbia	BC Lions (CFL)	**Ottawa Senators**	Vancouver Canucks	4–2	54,194
January 1, 2015	Winter Classic	Nationals Park, Washington, D.C.	Washington Nationals (MLB)	Chicago Blackhawks	**Washington Capitals**	3–2	42,832
February 21, 2015	Stadium Series	Levi's Stadium, Santa Clara, California	San Francisco 49ers (NFL)	**Los Angeles Kings**	San Jose Sharks	2–1	70,205
January 1, 2016	Winter Classic	Gillette Stadium, Foxborough, Massachusetts	New England Patriots (NFL)	**Montreal Canadiens**	Boston Bruins	5–1	67,246
February 21, 2016	Stadium Series	TCF Bank Stadium, Minneapolis, Minnesota	Minnesota Golden Gophers (NCAA)	Chicago Blackhawks	**Minnesota Wild**	6–1	50,426
February 27, 2016	Stadium Series	Coors Field, Denver, Colorado	Colorado Rockies (MLB)	**Detroit Red Wings**	Colorado Avalanche	5–3	50,095
October 23, 2016	Heritage Classic	Investors Group Field, Winnipeg, Manitoba	Winnipeg Blue Bombers (CFL)	**Edmonton Oilers**	Winnipeg Jets	3–0	33,240
January 1, 2017	Centennial Classic	BMO Field, Toronto, Ontario	Toronto Argonauts (CFL) and Toronto FC (MLS)	Detroit Red Wings	**Toronto Maple Leafs**	5–4 (OT)	40,148
January 2, 2017	Winter Classic	Busch Stadium, St. Louis, Missouri	St. Louis Cardinals (MLB)	Chicago Blackhawks	**St. Louis Blues**	4–1	46,556
February 25, 2017	Stadium Series	Heinz Field, Pittsburgh, Pennsylvania	Pittsburgh Steelers (NFL)	Philadelphia Flyers	**Pittsburgh Penguins**	4–2	67,318
December 16, 2017	NHL 100 Classic	TD Place Stadium, Ottawa, Ontario	Ottawa Redblacks (CFL)	Montreal Canadiens	**Ottawa Senators**	3–0	33,959
January 1, 2018	Winter Classic	Citi Field, Queens, New York	New York Mets (MLB)	**New York Rangers**	Buffalo Sabres	3–2 (OT)	41,821
March 3, 2018	Stadium Series	Navy–Marine Corps Memorial Stadium, Annapolis, Maryland	Navy Midshipmen (NCAA)	Toronto Maple Leafs	**Washington Capitals**	5–2	29,516
January 1, 2019	Winter Classic	Notre Dame Stadium, Notre Dame, Indiana	Notre Dame Fighting Irish (NCAA)	**Boston Bruins**	Chicago Blackhawks	4–2	76,126
February 23, 2019	Stadium Series	Lincoln Financial Field, Philadelphia, Pennsylvania	Philadelphia Eagles (NFL)	Pittsburgh Penguins	**Philadelphia Flyers**	4–3 (OT)	69,620
October 26, 2019	Heritage Classic	Mosaic Stadium, Regina, Saskatchewan	Saskatchewan Roughriders (CFL)	Calgary Flames	**Winnipeg Jets**	2–1 (OT)	33,518
January 1, 2020	Winter Classic	Cotton Bowl Stadium, Dallas, Texas	Red River Showdown (NCAA)	Nashville Predators	**Dallas Stars**	2–4	85,630
February 15, 2020	Stadium Series	Falcon Stadium, USAF Academy, Colorado	Air Force Falcons (NCAA)	**Los Angeles Kings**	Colorado Avalanche	3–1	43,574
February 20, 2021	NHL Outdoors at Lake Tahoe	Edgewood Tahoe Resort, Stateline, Nevada	American Century Championship (golf)	Vegas Golden Knights	**Colorado Avalanche**	3–2	—
February 21, 2021	NHL Outdoors at Lake Tahoe	Edgewood Tahoe Resort, Stateline, Nevada	American Century Championship (golf)	Philadelphia Flyers	**Boston Bruins**	7–3	—
January 1, 2022§	Winter Classic	Target Field, Minneapolis, Minnesota	Minnesota Twins (MLB)	**St. Louis Blues**	Minnesota Wild	6–4	38,519
February 26, 2022	Stadium Series	Nissan Stadium, Nashville, Tennessee	Tennessee Titans (NFL)	**Tampa Bay Lightning**	Nashville Predators	3–2	68,619
March 13, 2022	Heritage Classic	Tim Hortons Field, Hamilton, Ontario	Hamilton Tiger-Cats (CFL)	Toronto Maple Leafs	**Buffalo Sabres**	2–5	26,119
January 2, 2023	Winter Classic	Fenway Park, Boston, Massachusetts	Boston Red Sox (MLB)	Pittsburgh Penguins	**Boston Bruins**	1–2	39,243
February 18, 2023§	Stadium Series	Carter–Finley Stadium, Raleigh, North Carolina	NC State Wolfpack (NCAA)	Washington Capitals	**Carolina Hurricanes**	1–4	56,961
October 29, 2023	Heritage Classic	Commonwealth Stadium, Edmonton, Alberta	Edmonton Elks (CFL)	Calgary Flames	**Edmonton Oilers**	2–5	55,411
January 1, 2024	Winter Classic	T-Mobile Park, Seattle, Washington	Seattle Mariners (MLB)	Vegas Golden Knights	**Seattle Kraken**	0–3	47,313
February 17, 2024	Stadium Series	MetLife Stadium, East Rutherford, New Jersey	New York Giants and New York Jets (NFL)	Philadelphia Flyers	**New Jersey Devils**	3–6	70,328
February 18, 2024	Stadium Series	MetLife Stadium, East Rutherford, New Jersey	New York Giants and New York Jets (NFL)	**New York Rangers**	New York Islanders	6–5 (OT)	79,690
December 31, 2024	Winter Classic	Wrigley Field, Chicago, Illinois	Chicago Cubs (MLB)	**St. Louis Blues**	Chicago Blackhawks	6–2	40,933
March 1, 2025	Stadium Series	Ohio Stadium, Columbus, Ohio	Ohio State Buckeyes (NCAA)	Detroit Red Wings	**Columbus Blue Jackets**	5–3	94,751
January 2, 2026	Winter Classic	LoanDepot Park, Miami, Florida	Miami Marlins (MLB)	**New York Rangers**	Florida Panthers	5–1	36,153
February 1, 2026	Stadium Series	Raymond James Stadium, Tampa, Florida	Tampa Bay Buccaneers (NFL)	Boston Bruins	**Tampa Bay Lightning**	5–6 (SO)	64,617
October 25, 2026	Heritage Classic	Princess Auto Stadium, Winnipeg, Manitoba	Winnipeg Blue Bombers (CFL)	**Montreal Canadiens**	Winnipeg Jets	2–1	32,342
December 31, 2026	Winter Classic	Rice–Eccles Stadium, Salt Lake City, Utah	Utah Utes (NCAA)	Colorado Avalanche	Utah Mammoth	TBD	TBD
February 20, 2027	Stadium Series	AT&T Stadium, Arlington, Texas	Dallas Cowboys (NFL)	Vegas Golden Knights	Dallas Stars	TBD	TBD

Notes:

- † Due to rain being forecast, the BC Place retractable roof was kept closed during the game.
- § The game was originally scheduled for 2021, but it was postponed due to the COVID-19 pandemic.

== Appearances by team ==
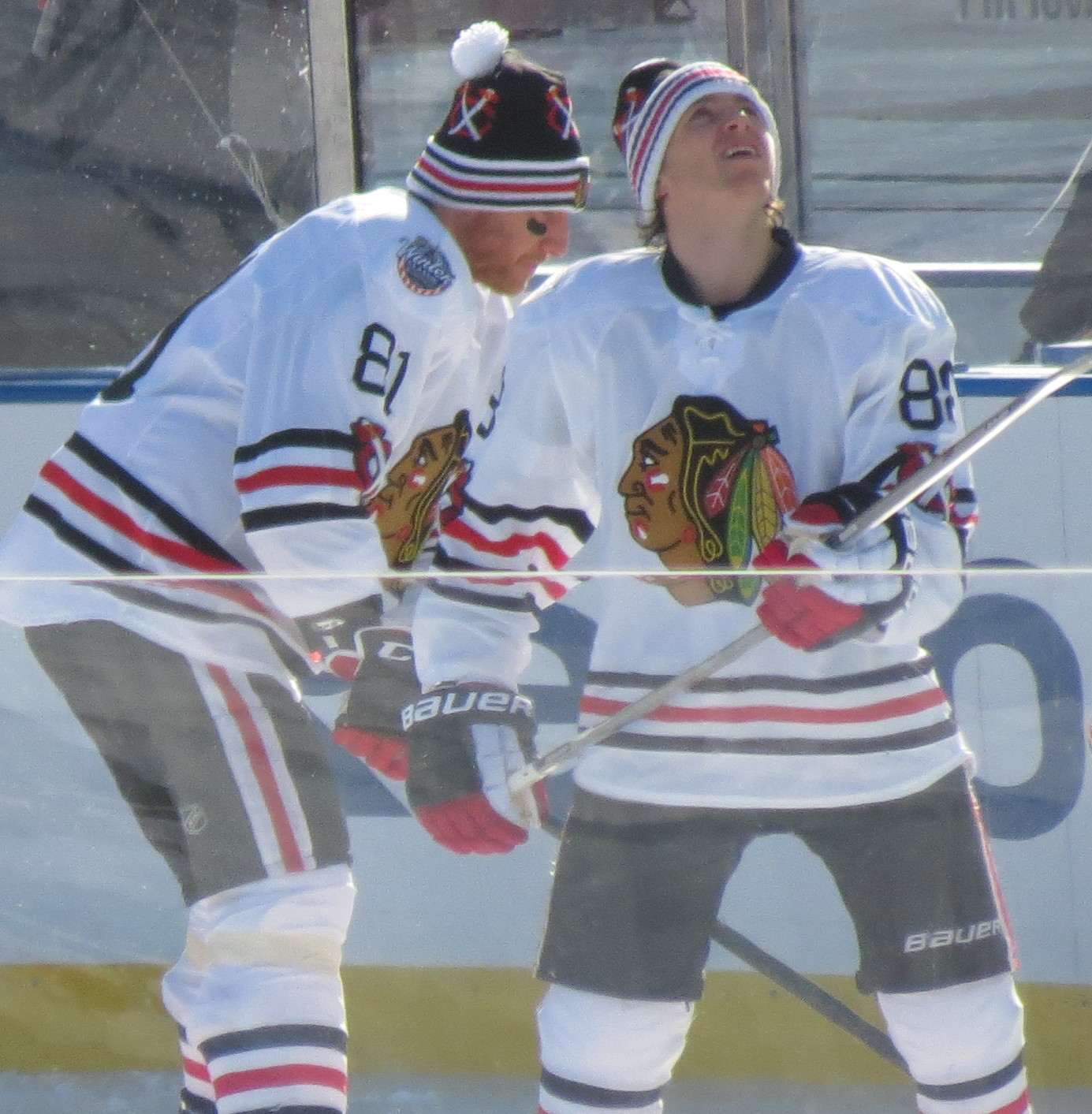
Marian Hossa and Patrick Kane of the Chicago Blackhawks warming up prior to the 2015 Winter Classic. The Blackhawks have participated in seven outdoor games.

In the sortable table below, teams are ordered first by number of appearances, then by number as designated home team, and finally by first year of appearance (team with oldest appearance is listed first). In the "Year(s)" column, bold years indicate winning the outdoor game appearances, while italics years indicate a future outdoor game. The sortable table excludes exhibition games with non-NHL opponents (such as those in 1954 and 1956) and pre-season games (such as the one in 1991).

Apps	Team	Home	Visitor	Year(s)	Wins	Losses	Win %	Winter	Stadium	Heritage
7	Chicago Blackhawks	4	3	2009, 2014, 2015, 2016, 2017, 2019, 2025	1	6	.143	5	2	0
6	Boston Bruins	4	2	2010, 2016, 2019, 2021, 2023, 2026	4	2	.667	4	1	0
6	Pittsburgh Penguins	2	4	2008, 2011, 2014, 2017, 2019, 2023	2	4	.333	3	3	0
6	Philadelphia Flyers	2	4	2010, 2012, 2017, 2019, 2021, 2024	1	5	.167	2	3	0
6	New York Rangers	0‡	6	2012, 2014 (2 games), 2018, 2024, 2026	6	0	1.000	3	3	0
5	Detroit Red Wings	1	4	2009, 2014, 2016, 2017, 2025	2	3	.400	2	2	0
5	Montreal Canadiens	0	5	2003, 2011, 2016, 2017, 2026	3	2	.600	1	0	3
4	Washington Capitals	2	2	2011, 2015, 2018, 2023	3	1	.750	2	2	0
4	Toronto Maple Leafs	1	3	2014, 2017, 2018, 2022	2	2	.500	1	1	1
3	Buffalo Sabres	3	0	2008, 2018, 2022	1	2	.333	2	0	1
3	Colorado Avalanche	3	0	2016, 2020, 2021, 2027	1	2	.333	1	2	0
3	Winnipeg Jets	3	0	2016, 2019, 2026	1	2	.333	0	0	3
3	Edmonton Oilers	2	1	2003, 2016, 2023	2	1	.667	0	0	3
3	Calgary Flames	1	2	2011, 2019, 2023	1	2	.333	0	0	3
3	Los Angeles Kings	1	2	2014, 2015, 2020	2	1	.667	0	3	0
3	St. Louis Blues	1	2	2017, 2022, 2025	3	0	1.000	3	0	0
2	New Jersey Devils	2	0	2014, 2024	1	1	.500	0	2	0
2	New York Islanders	2	0	2014, 2024	0	2	.000	0	2	0
2	Minnesota Wild	2	0	2016, 2022	1	1	.500	1	1	0
2	Ottawa Senators	1	1	2014, 2017	2	0	1.000	0	0	1
2	Nashville Predators	1	1	2020, 2022	0	2	.000	1	1	0
2	Tampa Bay Lightning	1	1	2022, 2026	2	0	1.000	0	2	0
2	Vegas Golden Knights	0	2	2021, 2024, 2027	0	2	.000	1	1	0
1	Vancouver Canucks	1	0	2014	0	1	.000	0	0	1
1	San Jose Sharks	1	0	2015	0	1	.000	0	1	0
1	Dallas Stars	1	0	2020, 2027	1	0	1.000	1	1	0
1	Carolina Hurricanes	1	0	2023	1	0	1.000	0	1	0
1	Seattle Kraken	1	0	2024	1	0	1.000	1	0	0
1	Columbus Blue Jackets	1	0	2025	1	0	1.000	0	1	0
1	Florida Panthers	1	0	2026	0	1	.000	1	0	0
1	Anaheim Ducks	0	1	2014	1	0	1.000	0	1	0
0	Utah Mammoth	—	—	2027	—	—	–	1	0	0

Note:

- ‡ The Rangers were designated as the visiting team for the three games held in New York City to comply with a property tax exemption for Madison Square Garden that requires the Rangers to play all of their home games at the arena.

== See also ==
- NBA outdoor games
