= 2020 NHL Stadium Series =

Outdoor National Hockey League game

	1	2	3	Total
Los Angeles Kings	1	0	2	3
Colorado Avalanche	0	1	0	1
- Date: February 15, 2020
- Venue: Falcon Stadium
- City: Air Force Academy
- Attendance: 43,574

The 2020 NHL Stadium Series was an outdoor regular season National Hockey League (NHL) game, part of the Stadium Series of games that took place on February 15, 2020. The game featured the Los Angeles Kings and the Colorado Avalanche at Falcon Stadium, located on the campus of the United States Air Force Academy in El Paso County, Colorado, north of Colorado Springs. The Kings defeated the Avalanche by a score of 3–1. This was the only game in the Stadium Series that was scheduled for the 2019–20 season.

The United States Air Force Academy's a cappella group and America's Got Talent Season 12 semi-finalist In The Stairwell performed the anthem prior to puck drop while country music artist Sam Hunt performed during the first intermission.

== Background ==
This was the second time the Avalanche have hosted the Stadium Series, as they last hosted the event in 2016 at Coors Field, as well as the second time a military academy has hosted the Stadium Series, after Navy–Marine Corps Memorial Stadium hosted the 2018 event. Also, this was the Kings' third NHL outdoor regular season game, following the 2014 and 2015 Stadium Series. This marks their second as the visiting team.

== Traffic issues ==
Due to traffic issues getting into Falcon Stadium during that day, a number of fans ended up missing large portions of the game. Both the league and the Air Force Academy had sent out traffic advisories throughout the week beforehand. But several accidents, and lane closures on Interstate 25 for emergency pothole repairs combined with delays getting through security at the academy's two main gates turned what is normally about a 45-minute drive from Denver to over four hours. A fatal accident then occurred after the game at the north gate, causing all vehicles to be rerouted through the south gate. The academy later issued a statement saying that it did all it could to ease the congestion, but "despite our best efforts, all of these, added to the already challenging traffic conditions along the I-25 corridor, combined and unfortunately impacted some fans travelling to the game". In addition, fans complained about long waits and shortages of food and apparel at the academy as well.

== Game summary ==
The Los Angeles Kings defeated the Colorado Avalanche 3–1, with Kings forward Tyler Toffoli recording the first hat trick in an NHL outdoor game. Toffoli opened up the scoring at 14:01 of the first period. Colorado defenseman Sam Girard tied the game less than a minute left in the second period. Toffoli then scored the game-winning goal with 55 seconds left and then added an empty-net goal with five seconds remaining. Los Angeles goalie Jonathan Quick made 32 saves in the win. Colorado goalie Philipp Grubauer made 14 saves before leaving the game with an injury in the third period, while backup goalie Pavel Francouz made six saves.

Scoring summary
Period	Team	Goal	Assist(s)	Time	Score
1st	LA	Tyler Toffoli (16)	Alex Iafallo (19), Joakim Ryan (3)	14:01	LA 1–0
2nd	COL	Sam Girard (3)	Mikko Rantanen (21)	19:18	1–1
3rd	LA	Tyler Toffoli (17)	Anze Kopitar (33)	19:05	LA 2–1
3rd	LA	Tyler Toffoli (18) – en	Anze Kopitar (34), Alex Iafallo (20)	19:55	LA 3–1

Number in parentheses represents the player's total in goals or assists to that point of the season

Penalty summary
Period	Team	Player	Penalty	Time	PIM
1st	LA	Jeff Carter	Hooking	7:07	2:00
1st	COL	Gabriel Landeskog	Tripping	7:10	2:00
2nd	No penalties				
3rd	LA	Blake Lizotte	Holding	9:10	2:00
3rd	COL	Andre Burakovsky	Interference	9:27	2:00

Shots by period
Team	1	2	3	Total
LA	7	5	11	23
COL	15	11	7	33

Power play opportunities
Team	Goals/Opportunities
Los Angeles	0 / 2
Colorado	0 / 2

Three star selections
	Team	Player	Statistics
1st	LA	Tyler Toffoli	Hat trick (3 goals)
2nd	LA	Jonathan Quick	32 saves
3rd	COL	Sam Girard	1 goal

== Team rosters ==
Los Angeles Kings
#		Player	Position
3	(United States)	Matt Roy	D
6	(Sweden)	Joakim Ryan	D
8	(Canada)	Drew Doughty (A)	D
9	(Sweden)	Adrian Kempe	LW
10	(Canada)	Michael Amadio	C
11	(Slovenia)	Anze Kopitar (C)	C
12	(United States)	Trevor Moore	C
19	(United States)	Alex Iafallo	LW
22	(United States)	Trevor Lewis	C
23	(United States)	Dustin Brown	LW
26	(Canada)	Sean Walker	D
27	(United States)	Alec Martinez	D
29	(Czech Republic)	Martin Frk	RW
32	(United States)	Jonathan Quick	G
40	(United States)	Cal Petersen	G
46	(United States)	Blake Lizotte	C
51	(Canada)	Austin Wagner	LW
56	(Canada)	Kurtis MacDermid	D
73	(Canada)	Tyler Toffoli	C
77	(Canada)	Jeff Carter (A)	C
Head coach: (Canada) Todd McLellan

Colorado Avalanche
#		Player	Position
6	(United States)	Erik Johnson (A)	D
8	(Canada)	Cale Makar	D
11	(Canada)	Matt Calvert	LW
13	(Russia)	Valeri Nichushkin	RW
16	(Russia)	Nikita Zadorov	D
17	(Canada)	Tyson Jost	C
27	(Canada)	Ryan Graves	D
28	(United States)	Ian Cole	D
29	(Canada)	Nathan MacKinnon (A)	C
31	(Germany)	Philipp Grubauer	G
37	(United States)	J. T. Compher	LW
39	(Czech Republic)	Pavel Francouz	G
41	(France)	Pierre-Edouard Bellemare	LW
49	(Canada)	Sam Girard	D
72	(Finland)	Joonas Donskoi	RW
81	(Russia)	Vladislav Kamenev	C
83	(United States)	Matt Nieto	LW
92	(Sweden)	Gabriel Landeskog (C)	LW
95	(Sweden)	Andre Burakovsky	LW
96	(Finland)	Mikko Rantanen	RW
Head coach: (Canada) Jared Bednar

Cal Petersen dressed as the back-up goaltender for Los Angeles and did not enter the game.

=== Scratches ===
- Los Angeles Kings: Derek Forbort, Ben Hutton, Nikolai Prokhorkin
- Colorado Avalanche: Mark Barberio, T. J. Tynan

== Broadcasting ==
In the United States, the game aired on NBC, with SN360 simulcasting NBC's feed in Canada. Due to there being no Stadium Series game the following year, this wound up being the last Stadium Series game broadcast on NBC after they lost the NHL's media rights to ESPN/ABC and TNT Sports before the 2021-22 season. The Stadium Series rights initially went to TNT in 2022, but were then acquired by ABC in 2023.
