= 2025 NHL Stadium Series =

Outdoor hockey game in Columbus, Ohio

	1	2	3	Total
Detroit Red Wings	0	1	2	3
Columbus Blue Jackets	0	3	2	5
- Date: March 1, 2025
- Venue: Ohio Stadium
- City: Columbus
- Attendance: 94,751

The 2025 NHL Stadium Series was an outdoor regular season National Hockey League (NHL) game, part of the NHL Stadium Series. The game was played on March 1, 2025, with the Columbus Blue Jackets hosting the Detroit Red Wings at Ohio Stadium on the campus of Ohio State University in Columbus, Ohio.

== Background ==
The league announced the game on February 17, 2024, during the first game of the previous season's Stadium Series. The league will return to only staging one Stadium Series per season instead of two. NHL executives had contemplated holding an outdoor game at Ohio Stadium since visiting the venue in November 2022. This would be the Columbus Blue Jackets' first outdoor game, while it would be the Detroit Red Wings' fourth. The choice of the opponents reflects the Michigan–Ohio State football rivalry, itself reflecting the rivalry between the states of Michigan and Ohio since the Toledo War. This initially left the Florida Panthers and the expansion Utah Hockey Club as the only teams to have not played an outdoor game; however, on January 8, 2025, it was announced that the Panthers will play the New York Rangers in the 2026 NHL Winter Classic at LoanDepot Park, leaving Utah as the only team to have not played an outdoor game, until it was announced in January 2026 that Utah would be hosting the 2027 NHL Winter Classic.

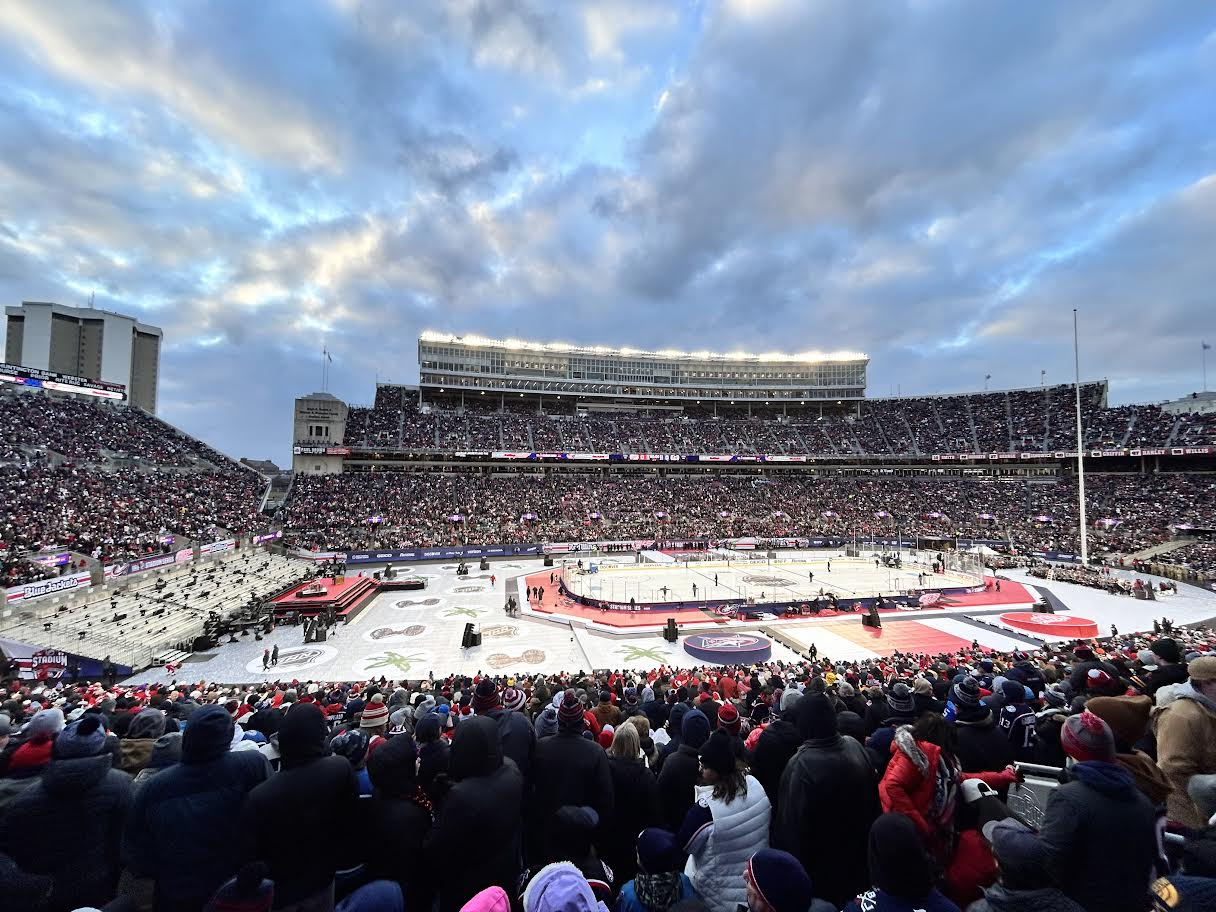
The 2025 NHL Stadium Series shortly before the opening faceoff.

== Game summary ==
The Blue Jackets defeated the Red Wings 5-3, with Blue Jackets goaltender Elvis Merzlikins stopping 43 of 46 shots. The Blue Jackets had goals from Denton Mateychuk, Dmitri Voronkov, Mathieu Olivier, Justin Danforth, and Adam Fantilli, while the Red Wings' goals came from Alex DeBrincat and Patrick Kane.

Scoring summary
Period	Team	Goal	Assist(s)	Time	Score
1st	No scoring				
2nd	CBJ	Denton Mateychuk (3)	Boone Jenner (6), James van Riemsdyk (15)	5:31	CBJ 1–0
2nd	DET	Alex DeBrincat (28) – pp	Patrick Kane (22), Moritz Seider (31)	13:06	1–1
2nd	CBJ	Dmitri Voronkov (20) – pp	Kent Johnson (22), Zach Werenski (45)	17:23	CBJ 2–1
2nd	CBJ	Mathieu Olivier (12)	Justin Danforth (8)	17:55	CBJ 3–1
3rd	DET	Patrick Kane (15)	Simon Edvinsson (17), Albert Johansson (6)	3:34	CBJ 3–2
3rd	DET	Alex DeBrincat (29)	Erik Gustafsson (15), Patrick Kane (23)	16:36	3–3
3rd	CBJ	Justin Danforth (6)	Zach Aston-Reese (10), Ivan Provorov (21)	17:43	CBJ 4–3
3rd	CBJ	Adam Fantilli (18) – en	Zach Werenski (46), Boone Jenner (7)	18:52	CBJ 5–3

Number in parentheses represents the player's total in goals or assists to that point of the season

Penalty summary
Period	Team	Player	Penalty	Time	PIM
1st	No penalties				
2nd	CBJ	Dante Fabbro	Interference	12:18	2:00
2nd	DET	Moritz Seider	Tripping	17:15	2:00
3rd	CBJ	Kirill Marchenko	High-sticking	5:27	2:00

Shots by period
Team	1	2	3	Total
DET	14	11	21	46
CBJ	6	7	8	21

Power play opportunities
Team	Goals/Opportunities
Detroit	1 / 2
Columbus	1 / 1

Three star selections
	Team	Player	Statistics
1st	CBJ	Elvis Merzlikins	43 saves
2nd	DET	Alex DeBrincat	2 goals
3rd	CBJ	Justin Danforth	1 goal, 1 assist

== Entertainment ==
O.A.R. performed with The Ohio State University Athletic Band at the pregame concert, while Columbus-based alternative rock duo Twenty One Pilots performed during the first intermission. The national anthem was performed by the Athletic Band accompanied by deaf performer Elyssa Williams in American Sign Language. Script Ohio on Ice was also performed by the Athletic Band. Several members of the Ohio State football team, who had won the National Championship five weeks earlier, were in attendance and were honored before the game, with the National Championship trophy also in attendance. Two of the members of the championship team were on hand for the ceremonial puck drop along with the Ohio State University president Ted Carter.

== Broadcasting ==
The game aired in the United States on ESPN and was streamed on ESPN+ and Disney+. After airing the last three Stadium Series games, ESPN's sister channel ABC was unavailable to carry this year's game due to NBA commitments. The ESPN feed was simulcast in Canada on FX due to other Hockey Night in Canada games airing on the various Sportsnet channels; the Stadium Series was still available to stream on Sportsnet+.
