= 2027 NHL Stadium Series =

Outdoor hockey game in Arlington, Texas

	1	2	3	Total
Vegas Golden Knights	-	-	-	0
Dallas Stars	-	-	-	0
- Date: February 20, 2027
- Venue: AT&T Stadium
- City: Arlington, Texas

The 2027 NHL Stadium Series is an upcoming outdoor regular season National Hockey League (NHL) game, part of the NHL Stadium Series. It is scheduled to be played on February 20, 2027, with the Dallas Stars hosting the Vegas Golden Knights at AT&T Stadium in Arlington, Texas.

== Background ==
The league announced the game on November 3, 2025. It will be the second outdoor NHL game to be played in Texas, following the 2020 NHL Winter Classic at the Cotton Bowl in Dallas. On January 29, 2026, the Vegas Golden Knights were announced as the opponent. Additionally, it will be the second outdoor game for the Stars and thrid outdoor game for the Golden Knights after appearing in the NHL Outdoors at Lake Tahoe, and the 2024 Winter Classic. The logo for the game was revealed on May 20, 2026.

== Broadcasting ==
The game will air in the United States on ABC and will streamed on ESPN+, Disney+, and Hulu. In Canada, the game will air on Sportsnet in English and TVA Sports in French.
