= 1991 outdoor NHL game in Las Vegas =

Outdoor National Hockey League game

	1	2	3	Total
New York Rangers	2	0	0	2
Los Angeles Kings	0	3	2	5
- Date: September 27, 1991
- Venue: Caesars Palace parking lot
- City: Paradise
- Attendance: 13,007

The 1991 outdoor National Hockey League (NHL) game in Las Vegas was an exhibition pre-season game between the New York Rangers and the Los Angeles Kings that took place on September 27, 1991, on an outside rink built over the parking lot of the Caesars Palace hotel and casino. This was the first official outdoor NHL game, and was part of the pre-season schedule for the 1991–92 NHL season for both teams.

== Background ==
Rich Rose, president of Caesars World Sports and a Rangers fan, first proposed having an exhibition ice hockey game outdoors in Las Vegas in 1988. His idea was met with criticism and incredulity, but Steve Flatow, the NHL's marketing director in 1991, thought it was an intriguing idea. Flatow suggested approaching the Los Angeles Kings, whose roster included Wayne Gretzky. With the Kings' interest, Flatow believed the Rangers would also be interested, and the game could therefore showcase high-profile teams from the two largest markets. Rose was able to convince the Kings' executive vice-president, Roy Mlakar, and the team's owner Bruce McNall. After that, Flatow helped Rose contact the Rangers, who agreed to play, and the event was scheduled for September 27, 1991.

The temporary seats and rink cost $135,000 to erect, and were ready two days prior to the event. The ice was laid down by Bob May of Ice Systems of America, under the directions of Michael Rzechula and Robert Krolak from ITI (now Ice Rink Supply). According to May, the outside ice rink in Las Vegas was "a big challenge", using three times the refrigeration equipment as one would for a regular rink. Fabric strips were laid into the ice as opposed to the usual painted stripes. The boards featured rotating and lit advertising panels, a concept using technology that was still in its infancy but later implemented in many NHL arenas. In-board advertisers included Toyota, Target, ITT Sheraton, Budweiser, Thrifty Car Rental, and Upper Deck trading cards.

== The game ==
The air temperature at puck drop was around 85 °F (29 °C), going as high as 95 °F (35 °C) during the course of the game, with 28% humidity, although the ice held up well. The Rangers started the game well, with goals by Tony Amonte and Doug Weight for a 2−0 lead at the end of the first period. In the second period, the Kings replied with goals by Tony Granato, Brian Benning, and Sylvain Couturier to take a 3−2 lead at the end of the second period. The Kings added two more goals in the third period by Jari Kurri and Wayne Gretzky for a 5−2 win. During the game, the ice was also infested with grasshoppers which caused this game to be delayed multiple times.

The Kings were captained by Wayne Gretzky, while the Rangers had yet to name a captain for the upcoming season. The game was officiated by referee Rob Shick, with linesmen Mike Cvik and Shane Heyer.

== Broadcasting ==
The game was televised live on Prime Ticket, and, due to its uniqueness, has since been repeated numerous times on other networks, such as MSG Network and the NHL Network. During the game, Kings goaltender Kelly Hrudey wore a camera mounted on his mask, and shots from his point of view were used during the broadcast.

== Cancelled second game ==
A second exhibition game was scheduled between the Rangers and the Kings to take place on September 29, 1991, in Charlotte, North Carolina. The game, however, was cancelled, due to poor and unsafe ice conditions at the Charlotte Coliseum.

== Legacy ==
The outdoor preseason game in Las Vegas paved the way for the NHL to further promote the game in the city, beginning with the Kings' Frozen Fury preseason series with the Colorado Avalanche from 1997 to 2016. In 2009, the NHL moved its annual NHL Awards Night from Toronto to Las Vegas, with each event taking place at various venues within the city. In 2017, the NHL expanded to Las Vegas with the establishment of the Vegas Golden Knights franchise, playing home games at T-Mobile Arena.

== See also ==
- NHL Heritage Classic
- NHL Winter Classic
- AHL Outdoor Classic
