= 2020 NHL Winter Classic =

Outdoor National Hockey League game in Dallas, Texas

	1	2	3	Total
Nashville Predators	2	0	0	2
Dallas Stars	0	1	3	4
- Date: January 1, 2020
- Venue: Cotton Bowl
- City: Dallas
- Attendance: 85,630

The 2020 NHL Winter Classic was an outdoor ice hockey game played in the National Hockey League (NHL) on January 1, 2020, at the Cotton Bowl in Dallas, Texas. The 12th edition of the Winter Classic, it matched Dallas Stars against the Nashville Predators; the Stars won, 4–2. This was the first NHL outdoor game for both teams. With a sold-out crowd of 85,630, it was the third-most attended game in NHL history.

== Background ==
The league announced on January 1, 2019 that the Cotton Bowl in Dallas, Texas would be the site of the game, with the Dallas Stars as the host team. The league then announced on January 25, 2019 that the Nashville Predators would be the visiting team.

The Cotton Bowl has been the home of the First Responder Bowl, a college football bowl game played on or near New Year's Day, since 2011; to accommodate the Winter Classic, the December 30, 2019 edition of the First Responder Bowl was moved to Gerald J. Ford Stadium in University Park, Texas. The Cotton Bowl previously hosted the Cotton Bowl Classic, another New Year's bowl game, from 1937 to 2009. The stadium has been used for other college football special events such as the State Fair Classic and the Red River Showdown.

On April 23, 2019, the day tickets went on sale to the general public, the event officially sold out, becoming the second-fastest Winter Classic in history to sell out. The crowd of 85,630 became the third-most attended game in NHL history, behind only the 2014 NHL Winter Classic and 2025 NHL Stadium Series.

== Game summary ==
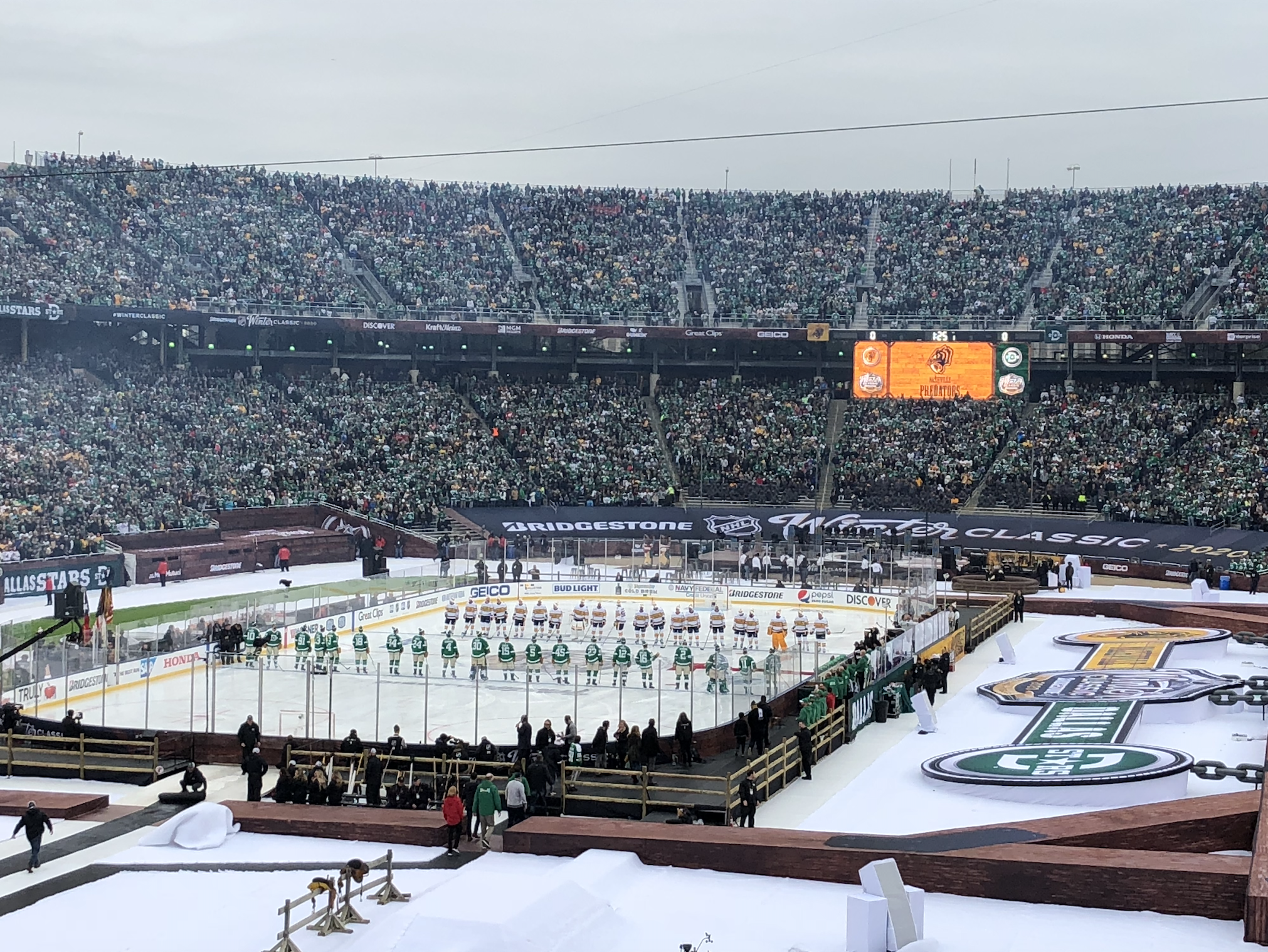
Both teams on the ice before the initial face-off.

January 1, 2020	Nashville Predators	2–4	Dallas Stars	Cotton Bowl	Recap

The Dallas Stars defeated the Nashville Predators 4–2 after overcoming a 2–0 deficit. Stars forward Corey Perry received a five-minute major and a game misconduct for elbowing Predators defenseman Ryan Ellis in the head at 2:44 into the first period. Ellis did not return for the rest of the game. The league would later give Perry a five-game suspension.

After Dallas forward Blake Comeau's delay of game penalty at 4:22 gave the Predators a 5-on-3 advantage, forward Matt Duchene scored the icebreaker at 5:46, then defenseman Dante Fabbro gave Nashville a 2–0 lead at 7:36 moments before Perry's five-minute major expired.

The Stars would then score four unanswered goals en route to the win. Comeau would give Dallas its first goal with 1:08 remaining in the second period. Then after forward Colin Blackwell was called for delay of game at 19:11 of the second, forward Mattias Janmark scored the equalizer on the ensuing power play 58 seconds into the third. Forward Alexander Radulov scored a power play goal at 5:06 to give the Stars their first lead, and defenseman Andrej Sekera added his team's fourth goal at 6:35.

Both goaltenders, Ben Bishop of the Stars and Pekka Rinne of the Predators, made 31 saves.

Scoring summary
Period	Team	Goal	Assist(s)	Time	Score
1st	NSH	Matt Duchene (9) – pp	Filip Forsberg (14) and Roman Josi (26)	05:46	NSH 1–0
1st	NSH	Dante Fabbro (4) – pp	Matt Duchene (19) and Roman Josi (27)	07:36	NSH 2–0
2nd	DAL	Blake Comeau (5)	Jason Dickinson (7) and Esa Lindell (11)	18:52	NSH 2–1
3rd	DAL	Mattias Janmark (5) – pp	John Klingberg (15) and Roope Hintz (6)	00:58	2–2
3rd	DAL	Alexander Radulov (12) – pp	John Klingberg (16) and Jamie Benn (11)	05:06	DAL 3–2
3rd	DAL	Andrej Sekera (1)	Radek Faksa (7) and Mattias Janmark (9)	06:35	DAL 4–2

Number in parentheses represents the player's total in goals or assists to that point of the season

Penalty summary
Period	Team	Player	Penalty	Time	PIM
1st	DAL	Corey Perry (served by Alexander Radulov)	Elbowing – major	02:44	5:00
1st	DAL	Corey Perry	Game misconduct	02:44	10:00
1st	DAL	Blake Comeau	Delay of game (puck over glass)	04:22	2:00
1st	NSH	Matt Irwin	Tripping	08:38	Penalty shot
1st	DAL	Radek Faksa	Roughing	11:27	2:00
1st	NSH	Colin Blackwell	Roughing	11:27	2:00
2nd
2nd	DAL	Tyler Seguin	Boarding	11:00	2:00
2nd	NSH	Roman Josi	Cross-checking	16:44	2:00
2nd	NSH	Colin Blackwell	Delay of game (puck over glass)	19:11	2:00
3rd	NSH	Ryan Johansen	Hooking	03:42	2:00

Shots by period
Team	1	2	3	Total
NSH	10	12	11	33
DAL	8	16	11	35

Power play opportunities
Team	Goals/Opportunities
Nashville	2 / 4
Dallas	2 / 3

Three star selections
	Team	Player	Statistics
1st	DAL	Blake Comeau	1 goal
2nd	DAL	John Klingberg	2 assists
3rd	NSH	Matt Duchene	1 goal, 1 assist

== Team rosters ==
Nashville Predators
#		Player	Position
4	(Canada)	Ryan Ellis (A)	D
5	(Canada)	Dan Hamhuis	D
8	(Canada)	Kyle Turris	C
9	(Sweden)	Filip Forsberg	LW
13	(United States)	Nick Bonino	C
14	(Sweden)	Mattias Ekholm (A)	D
15	(United States)	Craig Smith	C
19	(Sweden)	Calle Jarnkrok	C
23	(United States)	Rocco Grimaldi	C
33	(Sweden)	Viktor Arvidsson	LW
35	(Finland)	Pekka Rinne	G
42	(United States)	Colin Blackwell	C
51	(United States)	Austin Watson	LW
52	(Canada)	Matt Irwin	D
57	(Canada)	Dante Fabbro	D
59	(Switzerland)	Roman Josi (C)	D
64	(Finland)	Mikael Granlund	C
74	(Finland)	Juuse Saros	G
92	(Canada)	Ryan Johansen	C
95	(Canada)	Matt Duchene	C
Head coach: (United States) Peter Laviolette

Dallas Stars
#		Player	Position
2	(Canada)	Jamie Oleksiak	D
3	(Sweden)	John Klingberg (A)	D
4	(Finland)	Miro Heiskanen	D
5	(Slovakia)	Andrej Sekera	D
10	(Canada)	Corey Perry	RW
11	(Canada)	Andrew Cogliano	C
12	(Czech Republic)	Radek Faksa	C
13	(Sweden)	Mattias Janmark	C
14	(Canada)	Jamie Benn (C)	LW
15	(Canada)	Blake Comeau	LW
16	(United States)	Joe Pavelski	C
18	(Canada)	Jason Dickinson	C
23	(Finland)	Esa Lindell	D
24	(Finland)	Roope Hintz	LW
30	(United States)	Ben Bishop	G
34	(Russia)	Denis Gurianov	RW
35	(Russia)	Anton Khudobin	G
45	(Czech Republic)	Roman Polak	D
47	(Russia)	Alexander Radulov	RW
91	(Canada)	Tyler Seguin (A)	C
Head coach: (Canada) Rick Bowness

Juuse Saros and Anton Khudobin dressed as the back-up goaltenders. Neither entered the game.

=== Scratches ===
- Nashville Predators: Jarred Tinordi, Yakov Trenin, Yannick Weber
- Dallas Stars: Justin Dowling, Taylor Fedun

== Entertainment ==
The country music group Midland performed before the teams took the ice. Jake Hoot, Texas native and the winner of season 17 of the talent competition The Voice, sang the national anthem. The pop music duo Dan + Shay performed during the first intermission. The second intermission entertainment was a tribute to the State Fair of Texas, featuring the SMU Mustangs and Texas A&M Aggies dance teams and a rodeo show.

== Television ==
NBC broadcast the game in the U.S., as it has done since the Winter Classic's first game in 2008. In Canada, Sportsnet televised the game in English, while TVA Sports broadcast it in French. Due to the postponement of the following year’s Winter Classic, and then losing their NHL rights to ESPN/ABC and TNT Sports following the 2021 Stanley Cup Finals, this wound up being NBC’s last Winter Classic. TNT picked up the rights to the Winter Classic.

=== Ratings ===
The 2020 Winter Classic was the least-watched game in the event's history until the 2022 NHL Winter Classic, drawing only 1.97 million viewers. An error in the Nielsen reporting counted the hour-long pregame show as part of the game itself, which appears to be the primary factor in the ratings drop, as the game's primary competition—college football bowl games on ESPN and ABC—also saw lower cumulative viewership (though the two bowls scheduled opposite the Winter Classic individually had higher ratings than the year before, when there were three bowls in the slot). WGRZ in Buffalo, New York was the highest-rated local station, ahead of even Nashville (WSMV) and Dallas (KXAS), both of which set market records for NHL viewership with the contest.
