= 2027 NHL Winter Classic =

Upcoming outdoor hockey game in Salt Lake City

	1	2	3	Total
Colorado Avalanche	-	-	-	0
Utah Mammoth	-	-	-	0
- Date: December 31, 2026
- Venue: Rice–Eccles Stadium
- City: Salt Lake City

The 2027 NHL Winter Classic is an upcoming outdoor regular season National Hockey League (NHL) game, part of the Winter Classic series. The game is scheduled to take place on December 31, 2026, and will feature the Colorado Avalanche and the Utah Mammoth at Rice–Eccles Stadium in Salt Lake City. This will be the second time that two Winter Classics will be held in the same calendar year, following the 2024 and 2025 editions, which were both held in the 2024 calendar year.

== Background ==
The league announced the game on January 8, 2026. It will be the first outdoor NHL game played in the state of Utah, held at Rice–Eccles Stadium on the campus of the University of Utah, home of the Utah Utes football team and site of the opening and closing ceremonies for the 2002 Winter Olympics. The Utah Mammoth will play their first outdoor game in franchise history, becoming the last team in the league to do so. The Colorado Avalanche will play in their fourth outdoor game, their first since their 2021 appearance in Lake Tahoe, and will be the franchise's first Winter Classic appearance.
