= 2022 NHL Winter Classic =

Outdoor National Hockey League game in Minneapolis, Minnesota

	1	2	3	Total
St. Louis Blues	1	5	0	6
Minnesota Wild	1	1	2	4
- Date: January 1, 2022
- Venue: Target Field
- City: Minneapolis
- Attendance: 38,519

The 2022 NHL Winter Classic was an outdoor ice hockey game played in the National Hockey League (NHL) on January 1, 2022, at Target Field in Minneapolis, Minnesota. The 13th edition of the Winter Classic, it matched the St. Louis Blues against the Minnesota Wild; the Blues won, 6–4. The game was originally scheduled for 2021 but was postponed a year due to the COVID-19 pandemic.

== Background ==
The NHL announced on January 1, 2020, that the 2021 Winter Classic would be hosted by the Minnesota Wild at Target Field. The league then announced on February 23, 2020, that the St. Louis Blues would be the visiting team. The league had previously contemplated Target Field as a host for a Winter Classic game, touring the stadium both in 2018 and 2019, and observing how the city hosted the NCAA Final Four in 2019. It was to be the Wild's second outdoor game after hosting the 2016 NHL Stadium Series against the Chicago Blackhawks at TCF Bank Stadium. This was also to be the Blues' second outdoor game after hosting the 2017 NHL Winter Classic against the Blackhawks at Busch Stadium.

The NHL delayed the start of the 2020–21 season to January 2021, due to the COVID-19 pandemic having forced the 2019–20 playoffs to conclude in late-September. If the Winter Classic were to be held, it would have likely served as the season opener for both teams. On October 22, 2020, the NHL announced that the 2021 Winter Classic, and the 2021 All-Star Game in Sunrise, Florida, had been postponed due to "uncertainty as to when we will be able to welcome our fans back to our games," as fan participation and accompanying events are considered "integral to the[ir] success." The NHL stated that both events would not return until 2022 at the earliest, and that these events could be held in Minneapolis and Sunrise "in the near future" (but not yet naming them the 2022 hosts).

On June 28, 2021, the league confirmed that the Winter Classic between the Blues and the Wild at Target Field would be scheduled for 2022. The league further announced on September 27, 2021, that it would be the first Winter Classic scheduled for primetime, (Note: The 2011 NHL Winter Classic was the first Winter Classic to be played on primetime; however, it was rescheduled from its original 1:00 P.M. ET start due to weather concerns.) avoiding a repeat of the sunlight and heat issues that occurred during the previous season's NHL Outdoors at Lake Tahoe.

With various December 2021 games being postponed league-wide due to COVID-19 outbreaks among a large number of teams, the NHL remained adamant about holding the Winter Classic as scheduled. With the game time temperature at −5.7 °F (−20.9 °C), this was the coldest NHL outdoor game in history.

== Game summary ==
January 1, 2022	St. Louis Blues	6–4	Minnesota Wild	Target Field	Recap

Scoring summary
Period	Team	Goal	Assist(s)	Time	Score
1st	STL	David Perron (8)	Ryan O'Reilly (14) and Marco Scandella (6)	14:29	STL 1–0
1st	MIN	Kirill Kaprizov (13)	Ryan Hartman (13)	14:54	1–1
2nd	STL	Jordan Kyrou (11)	Unassisted	00:27	STL 2–1
2nd	STL	Vladimir Tarasenko (14)	Jordan Kyrou (19) and Robert Thomas (21)	08:55	STL 3–1
2nd	STL	Ivan Barbashev (12) – pp	Jordan Kyrou (20) and Pavel Buchnevich (19)	14:46	STL 4–1
2nd	STL	Jordan Kyrou (12)	Robert Thomas (22)	17:58	STL 5–1
2nd	MIN	Rem Pitlick (6)	Victor Rask (6) and Nick Bjugstad (1)	18:38	STL 5–2
2nd	STL	Torey Krug (5)	Ivan Barbashev (15)	19:19	STL 6–2
3rd	MIN	Ryan Hartman (15)	Mats Zuccarello (17) and Kirill Kaprizov (25)	08:40	STL 6–3
3rd	MIN	Kevin Fiala (7)	Kirill Kaprizov (26) and Alex Goligoski (19)	14:22	STL 6–4

Number in parentheses represents the player's total in goals or assists to that point of the season

Penalty summary
Period	Team	Player	Penalty	Time	PIM
1st	STL	Jordan Binnington (served by Klim Kostin)	Tripping	11:38	2:00
1st	STL	Logan Brown	Tripping	15:36	2:00
1st	MIN	Dmitry Kulikov	Tripping	15:54	2:00
2nd	STL	Niko Mikkola	Interference	09:03	2:00
2nd	MIN	Nico Sturm	Slashing	12:47	2:00
3rd	MIN	Rem Pitlick	Tripping	03:15	2:00
3rd	STL	Colton Parayko	Elbowing	12:04	2:00

Shots by period
Team	1	2	3	Total
STL	14	14	4	32
MIN	6	9	18	33

Power play opportunities
Team	Goals/Opportunities
St. Louis	1 / 3
Minnesota	0 / 4

Three star selections
	Team	Player	Statistics
1st	STL	Jordan Kyrou	2 goals, 2 assists
2nd	MIN	Kirill Kaprizov	1 goal, 2 assists
3rd	STL	Vladimir Tarasenko	1 goal

== Team rosters ==
St. Louis Blues
#		Player	Position
6	(Canada)	Marco Scandella	D
18	(Canada)	Robert Thomas	C
20	(United States)	Brandon Saad	LW
21	(Canada)	Tyler Bozak	C
22	(United States)	Logan Brown	C
25	(Canada)	Jordan Kyrou	C
35	(Finland)	Ville Husso	G
37	(Russia)	Klim Kostin	C
47	(United States)	Torey Krug	D
48	(United States)	Scott Perunovich	D
49	(Russia)	Ivan Barbashev	C
50	(Canada)	Jordan Binnington	G
55	(Canada)	Colton Parayko (A)	D
57	(Canada)	David Perron	LW
70	(Sweden)	Oskar Sundqvist	C
72	(United States)	Justin Faulk	D
77	(Finland)	Niko Mikkola	D
89	(Russia)	Pavel Buchnevich	LW
90	(Canada)	Ryan O'Reilly (C)	C
91	(Russia)	Vladimir Tarasenko (A)	RW
Head coach: (Canada) Craig Berube

Minnesota Wild
#		Player	Position
4	(United States)	Jon Merrill	D
7	(Germany)	Nico Sturm	C
8	(Canada)	Jordie Benn	D
16	(United States)	Rem Pitlick	C
17	(Canada)	Marcus Foligno (A)	LW
18	(United States)	Jordan Greenway	LW
21	(United States)	Brandon Duhaime	RW
22	(Switzerland)	Kevin Fiala	LW
24	(Canada)	Matt Dumba (A)	D
27	(United States)	Nick Bjugstad	C
29	(Russia)	Dmitry Kulikov	D
33	(Canada)	Cam Talbot	G
34	(Finland)	Kaapo Kahkonen	G
36	(Norway)	Mats Zuccarello (A)	RW
38	(United States)	Ryan Hartman	RW
47	(United States)	Alex Goligoski	D
49	(Sweden)	Victor Rask	C
59	(Canada)	Calen Addison	D
89	(Canada)	Frederick Gaudreau	C
97	(Russia)	Kirill Kaprizov	LW
Head coach: (Canada) Dean Evason

Ville Husso dressed as the back-up goaltender for St. Louis and did not enter the game.

=== Scratches ===
- St. Louis Blues: Robert Bortuzzo, Jake Walman
- Minnesota Wild: Jonas Brodin, Joel Eriksson Ek

== Entertainment ==
VocalEssence Singers Of This Age, a group of Minneapolis–Saint Paul high school students, performed the national anthem arranged by their director, G. Phillip Shoultz, III. Minnesota sports stars were then introduced, including Rachel Banham of the Minnesota Lynx, former Minnesota Timberwolves player Troy Hudson, and former Minnesota Vikings player John Randle. Former Minnesota Twins players Justin Morneau, Joe Mauer, Kent Hrbek, and Tony Oliva participated in the ceremonial puck drop. Country music singer Thomas Rhett performed during the first intermission. The roster for the U.S. Olympic women's ice hockey team competing at the 2022 Winter Olympics was revealed during the second intermission.

== Broadcasting ==
In April 2021, TNT acquired the rights to the U.S. television broadcast. The American radio rights will be held by Sports USA Radio Network, the first in a four-year agreement with Sports USA.

With the game being scheduled for a Saturday night, it aired in Canada under the Hockey Night in Canada banner on Sportsnet.

== Television ratings ==
The 2022 NHL Winter Classic surpassed the 2017 game for the lowest ratings of any Winter Classic in the United States, with an average of less than 1.36 million American viewers watching the game. The 2024 game would surpass this game with less than 1.1 million viewers watching.
