= 2024 NHL Stadium Series =

Outdoor National Hockey League game

MetLife Stadium, East Rutherford, New Jersey
- February 17–18, 2024
- Game one: Philadelphia Flyers at New Jersey Devils
- Game two: New York Rangers at New York Islanders
- Total attendance: 150,018

The 2024 NHL Stadium Series was a series of two outdoor regular season National Hockey League (NHL) games that were played during the 2023–24 NHL season. This was the first time since 2016 that two Stadium Series games were scheduled instead of just one. Both games were held on the weekend of February 17–18, 2024, at MetLife Stadium in East Rutherford, New Jersey. The Philadelphia Flyers faced the New Jersey Devils on February 17, while the New York Rangers played the New York Islanders on February 18.

== Background ==
The NHL announced the Stadium Series games on June 3, 2023. The league originally planned to only stage one game with just the Rangers and Devils.

All three NHL teams in the New York metropolitan area were represented, like the two games at Yankee Stadium in the 2014 NHL Stadium Series. As with the case of 2014, the Rangers were designated the away team for their game against the Islanders as their home arena, Madison Square Garden, receives tax-exempt status, but only if the Rangers do not "cease playing" home games at MSG, generally interpreted as playing any "home" game outside of MSG. This also marked the first time the Devils played a home game at the Meadowlands Sports Complex in nearly 17 years, following the team's departure from the Meadowlands Arena at the end of the 2006-07 NHL season for its current home of Prudential Center.

MetLife Stadium, which is less than ten miles from the regular home arenas of both the Rangers and Devils, were scheduled to undergo renovations after the end of the 2023 National Football League season in preparation for the 2026 FIFA World Cup, and therefore several low-level sideline seats were covered with tarp prior to the Stadium Series.

== Game one (Devils vs. Flyers, February 17, 2024) ==
2024 NHL Stadium Series: Game 1
	1	2	3	Total
Philadelphia Flyers	0	2	1	3
New Jersey Devils	2	2	2	6
- Date: February 17, 2024
- Attendance: 70,328

=== Game summary ===
Despite being outshot 48–40, New Jersey controlled most of the game, thanks in large part to two goals from Nico Hischier, two goals from Nathan Bastian, one goal from Tyler Toffoli, and one goal from Brendan Smith. Nico Daws, recently called up from the Utica Comets, made 45 saves in the Devils’ 6–3 victory. For Philadelphia, Nick Seeler scored once and Owen Tippett scored twice.

Scoring summary
Period	Team	Goal	Assist(s)	Time	Score
1st	NJD	Nico Hischier (17)	Ondrej Palat (13), John Marino (14)	0:32	NJD 1–0
1st	NJD	Tyler Toffoli (22)	Brendan Smith (5), Jack Hughes (33)	13:30	NJD 2–0
2nd	PHI	Owen Tippett (20)	Travis Konecny (26), Egor Zamula (11)	7:43	NJD 2–1
2nd	NJD	Brendan Smith (2)	Ondrej Palat (14), Nico Hischier (20)	16:36	NJD 3–1
2nd	NJD	Nathan Bastian (4)	Timo Meier (12), Curtis Lazar (20)	17:48	NJD 4–1
2nd	PHI	Owen Tippett (21) – pp	Travis Konecny (27), Morgan Frost (18)	18:23	NJD 4–2
3rd	NJD	Nico Hischier (18)	Jesper Bratt (38), John Marino (15)	2:48	NJD 5–2
3rd	PHI	Nick Seeler (1)	Scott Laughton (18), Sean Walker (15)	9:07	NJD 5–3
3rd	NJD	Nathan Bastian (5) – en	Erik Haula (17), Curtiz Lazar (13)	18:15	NJD 6–3

Number in parentheses represents the player's total in goals or assists to that point of the season

Penalty summary
Period	Team	Player	Penalty	Time	PIM
1st	PHI	Morgan Frost	High Sticking	1:35	2:00
1st	NJD	Colin Miller	Delay Of Game	5:10	2:00
1st	PHI	Jamie Drysdale	Holding	5:57	2:00
1st	PHI	Scott Laughton	Delay Of Game	19:18	2:00
2nd
2nd	PHI	Nicolas Deslauriers	Roughing	8:32	2:00
2nd	NJD	Colin Miller	Roughing	8:32	2:00
2nd	NJD	Simon Nemec	Holding	10:12	2:00
2nd	PHI	Travis Konecny	Slashing	10:51	2:00
2nd	PHI	Nick Seeler	High-sticking	13:46	2:00
2nd	NJD	Ondrej Palat	Hooking	18:00	2:00
3rd	No penalties				

Shots by period
Team	1	2	3	Total
PHI	9	27	12	48
NJ	13	14	13	40

Power play opportunities
Team	Goals/Opportunities
Philadelphia	1 / 3
New Jersey	0 / 5

Three star selections
	Team	Player	Statistics
1st	NJD	Nico Hischier	2 goals, 1 assist
2nd	NJD	Brendan Smith	1 goal, 1 assist
3rd	NJD	Nathan Bastian	2 goals

== Game two (Islanders vs. Rangers, February 18, 2024) ==
2024 NHL Stadium Series: Game 2
	1	2	3	OT	Total
New York Rangers	1	2	2	1	6
New York Islanders	3	1	1	0	5
- Date: February 18, 2024
- Attendance: 79,690

=== Game summary ===
After being down 4–1, the Rangers defeated the Islanders in an impressive comeback, scoring three unanswered goals in 4:18 after being down 5–3, resulting in a 6–5 overtime win. Igor Shesterkin made 36 saves on 41 shots. Scoring for the Rangers included Erik Gustafsson, Vincent Trocheck, Chris Kreider, Mika Zibanejad, and Artemi Panarin. The Islanders' goals came from Mathew Barzal, Bo Horvat, Anders Lee, Brock Nelson, and Alexander Romanov.

Scoring summary
Period	Team	Goal	Assist(s)	Time	Score
1st	NYR	Erik Gustafsson (5)	Kaapo Kakko (4), Jonny Brodzinski (11)	1:28	NYR 1–0
1st	NYI	Brock Nelson (23)	Scott Mayfield (5), Cal Clutterbuck (11)	4:20	1–1
1st	NYI	Bo Horvat (22)	Noah Dobson (49), Adam Pelech (6)	7:18	NYI 2–1
1st	NYI	Mathew Barzal (16) – pp	Brock Nelson (20), Noah Dobson (50)	7:34	NYI 3–1
2nd	NYI	Anders Lee (14) – pp	Pierre Engvall (11), Mike Reilly (9)	1:03	NYI 4–1
2nd	NYR	Vincent Trocheck (17) – pp	Artemi Panarin (41), Adam Fox (36)	5:36	NYI 4–2
2nd	NYR	Vincent Trocheck (18)	Alexis Lafreniere (18), Ryan Lindgren (8)	18:24	NYI 4–3
3rd	NYI	Alexander Romanov (6)	Noah Dobson (51)	1:53	NYI 5–3
3rd	NYR	Chris Kreider (28) – pp	Artemi Panarin (42), Vincent Trocheck (33)	15:52	NYI 5–4
3rd	NYR	Mika Zibanejad (18) – pp	Adam Fox (37), Alexis Lafreniere (19)	18:31	5–5
OT	NYR	Artemi Panarin (32)	Unassisted	0:10	NYR 6–5

Number in parentheses represents the player's total in goals or assists to that point of the season

Penalty summary
Period	Team	Player	Penalty	Time	PIM
1st	NYR	Matt Rempe	Fighting – major	1:29	5:00
1st	NYI	Matt Martin	Fighting – major	1:29	5:00
1st	NYI	Scott Mayfield	Boarding	5:20	2:00
1st	NYR	Alexis Lafreniere	Tripping	6:47	2:00
2nd	NYR	Chris Kreider	Hooking	0:34	2:00
2nd	NYI	Anders Lee	Slashing	4:19	2:00
3rd	NYI	Scott Mayfield	Tripping	10:36	2:00
3rd	NYI	Alexander Romanov	Roughing	13:40	2:00
3rd	NYR	Vincent Trocheck	Roughing	13:40	2:00
3rd	NYI	Mathew Barzal	Hooking	14:16	2:00
3rd	NYI	Scott Mayfield	Tripping	17:32	2:00

Shots by period
Team	1	2	3	OT	Total
NYR	7	13	16	2	38
NYI	18	17	6	0	41

Power play opportunities
Team	Goals/Opportunities
NY Rangers	3/5
NY Islanders	2/2

Three star selections
	Team	Player	Statistics
1st	NYR	Vincent Trocheck	2 goals, 1 assist
2nd	NYR	Artemi Panarin	1 goal, 2 assists
3rd	NYI	Brock Nelson	1 goal, 1 assist

== Entertainment ==
During Game 1, pop rock trio and Wyckoff, New Jersey, natives, Jonas Brothers headlined the pregame concert, and performed during the second intermission, while New Jersey–based rock band the Gaslight Anthem performed "Howl" during the Devils' introduction, the first intermission, and after any goals scored by the Devils. The national anthem was performed by saxophonist and E Street Band member Jake Clemons. The Devils were introduced by Newark area born-and-raised actor/musician Max Weinberg at the start of the game. Devils alumni player Martin Brodeur dropped the ceremonial puck.

During Game 2, indie pop trio and New York natives AJR performed during the first intermission. The pregame team introductions were conducted by players from the Jets and Giants which were Solomon Thomas, Alijah Vera-Tucker, Breece Hall, C.J. Mosley, Quinnen Williams, Sterling Shepard, Saquon Barkley, and Tommy Devito. The national anthem was sung by United States Air Force Master Sergeant Retired Nalani Quintello, topped off with a flyover featuring two United States Navy F/A-18F Super Hornet aircraft from the Carrier Air Wing Eight based at Naval Air Station Oceana in Virginia Beach. Alumni players from the Rangers and Islanders Mark Messier (who serves as ESPN/ABC's NHL studio analyst) and Bryan Trottier presided over the ceremonial puck drop.

The colors for both games were presented by the Navy Talent Acquisition Group Empire State office Color Guard, which is composed of Navy recruiters stationed on Long Island, New York City, and New Jersey. The anthems for both games were signed by deaf performer Reba Del Angelo.

== Broadcasting ==
In the United States, both games aired on ABC and simulcast on ESPN+. In Canada, Sportsnet simulcasted ABC's feed.
