= 2025 NHL Winter Classic =

Outdoor hockey game in Chicago

| | 1 | 2 | 3 | Total |
|---|---|---|---|---|
| St. Louis Blues | 2 | 3 | 1 | 6 |
| Chicago Blackhawks | 1 | 0 | 1 | 2 |
- Date: December 31, 2024
- Venue: Wrigley Field
- City: Chicago
- Attendance: 40,933

The 2025 NHL Winter Classic was an outdoor regular season National Hockey League (NHL) game, part of the Winter Classic series. The game was played on December 31, 2024, with the Chicago Blackhawks hosting the St. Louis Blues at Wrigley Field in Chicago. For the first time, two Winter Classics were held in the same calendar year, as the 2024 Winter Classic had been played on January 1, 2024. The Blues defeated the Blackhawks 6–2.

== Background ==
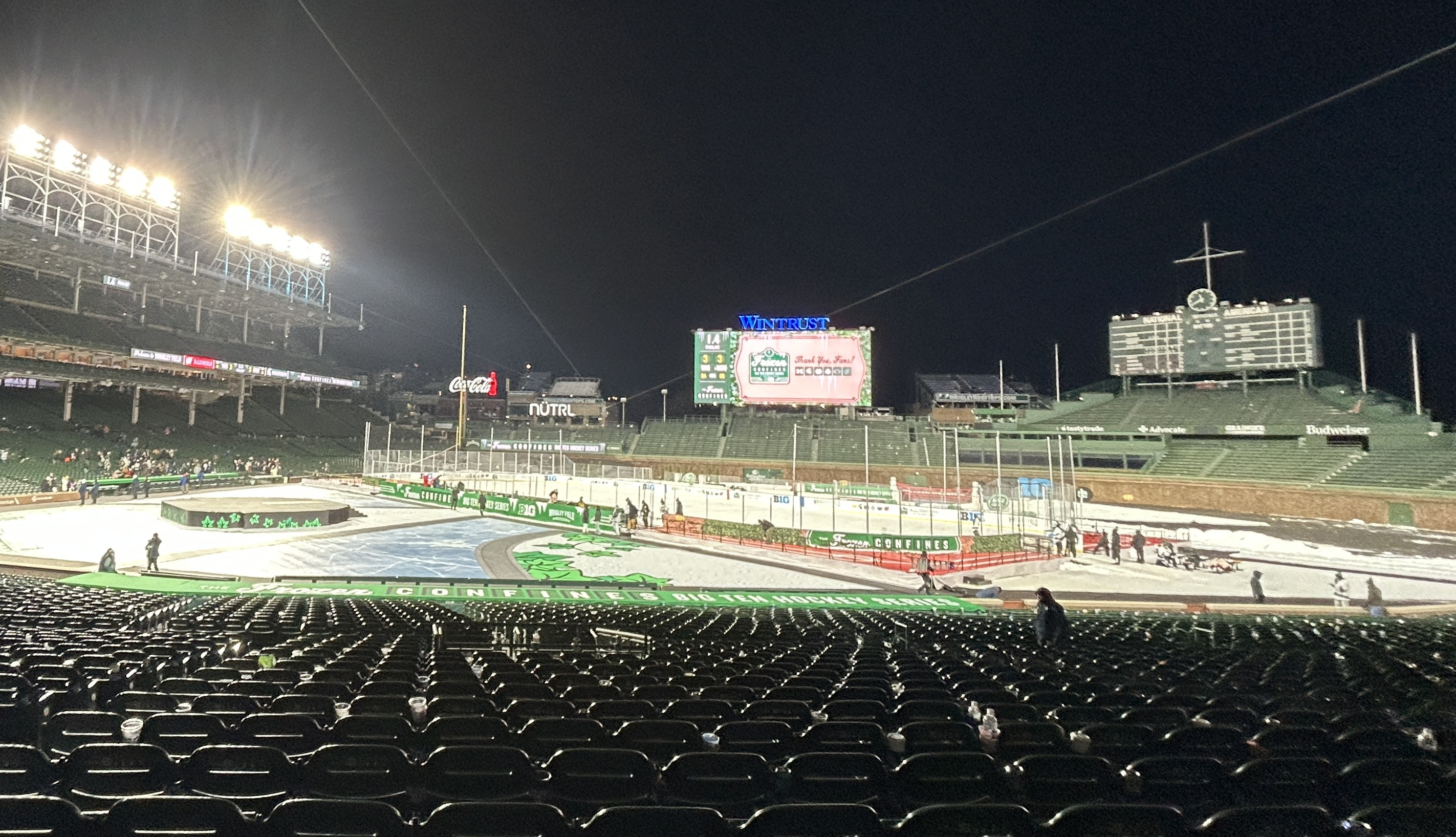
Ice used for the game (photographed following the Frozen Confines college hockey games held January 3–4, 2025)

The league announced the game on February 7, 2024, during the first intermission of the NHL on TNT's broadcast of the Tampa Bay Lightning–New York Rangers game. Several media sources however leaked the game's site and opponents on the day before.

This was a rematch of the 2017 NHL Winter Classic, when the St. Louis Blues defeated the Chicago Blackhawks, 4−1, at Busch Stadium in St. Louis. This was also Wrigley Field's second time hosting an NHL outdoor game, having previously hosted the 2009 NHL Winter Classic.

New Year's Eve was chosen as the date for the Winter Classic, as opposed to its traditional New Year's Day scheduling, in response to the expansion of the College Football Playoff from four teams to 12 beginning in the 2024–25 postseason.

A moment of silence for former president of the United States Jimmy Carter who died two days earlier was held prior to the game.

== Game summary ==
| December 31 | St. Louis Blues | 6–2 | Chicago Blackhawks | Wrigley Field | Recap |

Scoring summary (Note: Number in parentheses represents the player's total in goals or assists to that point of the season)
| Period | Team (Note: CHI – Chicago Blackhawks, STL – St. Louis Blues) | Goal | Assist(s) | Time | Score |
|---|---|---|---|---|---|
| 1st | STL | Cam Fowler (2) | Pavel Buchnevich (15) and Robert Thomas (21) | 01:40 | 1–0 STL |
| 1st | STL | Jordan Kyrou (16) | Jake Neighbours (9) and Dylan Holloway (12) | 8:10 | 2-0 STL |
| 1st | CHI | Taylor Hall (8) | Ryan Donato (10) | 15:26 | 2–1 STL |
| 2nd | STL | Justin Faulk (2) | Philip Broberg (11) and Oskar Sundqvist (3) | 07:15 | 3–1 STL |
| 2nd | STL | Dylan Holloway (14) | Justin Faulk (10) and Brayden Schenn (14) | 13:34 | 4–1 STL |
| 2nd | STL | Cam Fowler (3) | Unassisted | 17:51 | 5–1 STL |
| 3rd | CHI | Tyler Bertuzzi (12) | Seth Jones (10) and Connor Bedard (23) | 11:15 | 5–2 STL |
| 3rd | STL | Alexandre Texier (3) | Justin Faulk (11) and Nathan Walker (4) | 16:18 | 6–2 STL |

Penalty summary
| Period | Team | Player | Penalty | Time | PIM |
|---|---|---|---|---|---|
| 1st | CHI | Louis Crevier | Delay of game (puck over glass) | 00:48 | 2:00 |
| 1st | CHI | Nolan Allan | Holding | 06:34 | 2:00 |
| 1st | STL | Philip Broberg | Interference | 13:41 | 2:00 |
| 2nd | CHI | Taylor Hall | Hooking | 00:58 | 2:00 |
| 2nd | STL | Alexey Toropchenko | Goaltender interference | 09:25 | 2:00 |
| 2nd | CHI | Nick Foligno | Fighting – major | 17:51 | 5:00 |
| 2nd | STL | Brayden Schenn | Fighting – major | 17:51 | 5:00 |
| 3rd | STL | Pavel Buchnevich | Tripping | 00:14 | 2:00 |
| 3rd | STL | Zachary Bolduc | Cross-checking | 07:10 | 2:00 |
| 3rd | CHI | Tyler Bertuzzi | Slashing | 07:10 | 2:00 |
| 3rd | STL | Alexey Toropchenko | Tripping | 10:30 | 2:00 |

Shots by period
| Team | 1 | 2 | 3 | Total |
|---|---|---|---|---|
| STL | 7 | 11 | 10 | 28 |
| CHI | 10 | 15 | 5 | 30 |

Power play opportunities
| Team | Goals/Opportunities |
|---|---|
| STL | 2/3 |
| CHI | 2/4 |

Three star selections
| | Team | Player | Statistics |
|---|---|---|---|
| 1st | STL | Cam Fowler | 2 goals |
| 2nd | STL | Justin Faulk | 1 goal, 2 assists |
| 3rd | CHI | Taylor Hall | 1 goal |

== Entertainment ==
The American national anthem was performed by Blackhawks anthem singer Jim Cornelison, accompanied by organist Carrie Marcotte and American Sign Language performer Nathaniel Kelly and Interpreter Samantha Taplin. This is Cornelison's third time performing the national anthem at the Winter Classic, following 2009 and 2019. Chicago-based rapper Chance the Rapper performed during the first intermission. Chicago-based rock group The Smashing Pumpkins performed during the player introductions while lead singer Billy Corgan performed "Take Me Out to the Ball Game".

== Broadcasting ==
In the United States, broadcasting rights to the game are held by TNT, with sister channel TruTV simulcasting, and streaming on Max. In Canada, rights are held by Sportsnet with streaming on Sportsnet+.

=== Ratings ===
The Winter Classic had been on a steady decline in ratings, one exacerbated by the move to the cable-only TNT in 2022, and the move to the less crowded slot on New Year's Eve afternoon (much of the game took place in the gap between the 2024 Texas Bowl ending and the Fiesta Bowl's kickoff) was intended to make the event "something (...) very unique on that day."

In practice, the move to New Year's Eve backfired, with viewership hitting an all-time low for the event, as one of the bowl games that partially overlapped with the game, the Citrus Bowl, featured the Illinois Fighting Illini football team (potentially diverting Illinois viewers away from the game); viewers also commented on social media of how they had not noticed the date change and had sought the game on television during New Year's Day only to find they had missed it, while others expressed burnout toward seeing the Blackhawks in yet another Winter Classic after losing all four previous appearances and sitting, at the time, in last place in the NHL's standings.

The timing also meant that much of the country west of the Eastern Time Zone was at work or commuting home during the game, as New Year's Eve is not universally recognized as a work holiday.
