= 2015 NHL Stadium Series =

Outdoor National Hockey League game

	1	2	3	Total
Los Angeles Kings	1	0	1	2
San Jose Sharks	1	0	0	1
- Date: February 21, 2015
- Venue: Levi's Stadium
- City: Santa Clara
- Attendance: 70,205

The 2015 NHL Stadium Series was an outdoor regular season National Hockey League (NHL) game, part of the Stadium Series of games held at football or baseball stadiums. The Los Angeles Kings played against the San Jose Sharks at Levi's Stadium in Santa Clara, California on February 21, 2015. This was the only game in the Stadium Series during the 2014–15 NHL regular season (as opposed to multiple games in 2014 and 2016). The game coincided with NBC Sports' "Hockey Day in America" coverage, and aired on NBCSN in the United States, while it was the second game of CBC's Hockey Night in Canada doubleheader.

The Kings defeated the Sharks 2–1 on a goal by Marian Gaborik early in the third period to extend the Kings' winning streak to seven games, while the Sharks fell to 2–5–1 in their last eight games. With the victory, the Kings overtook the Sharks for the final wild card spot in the Western Conference.

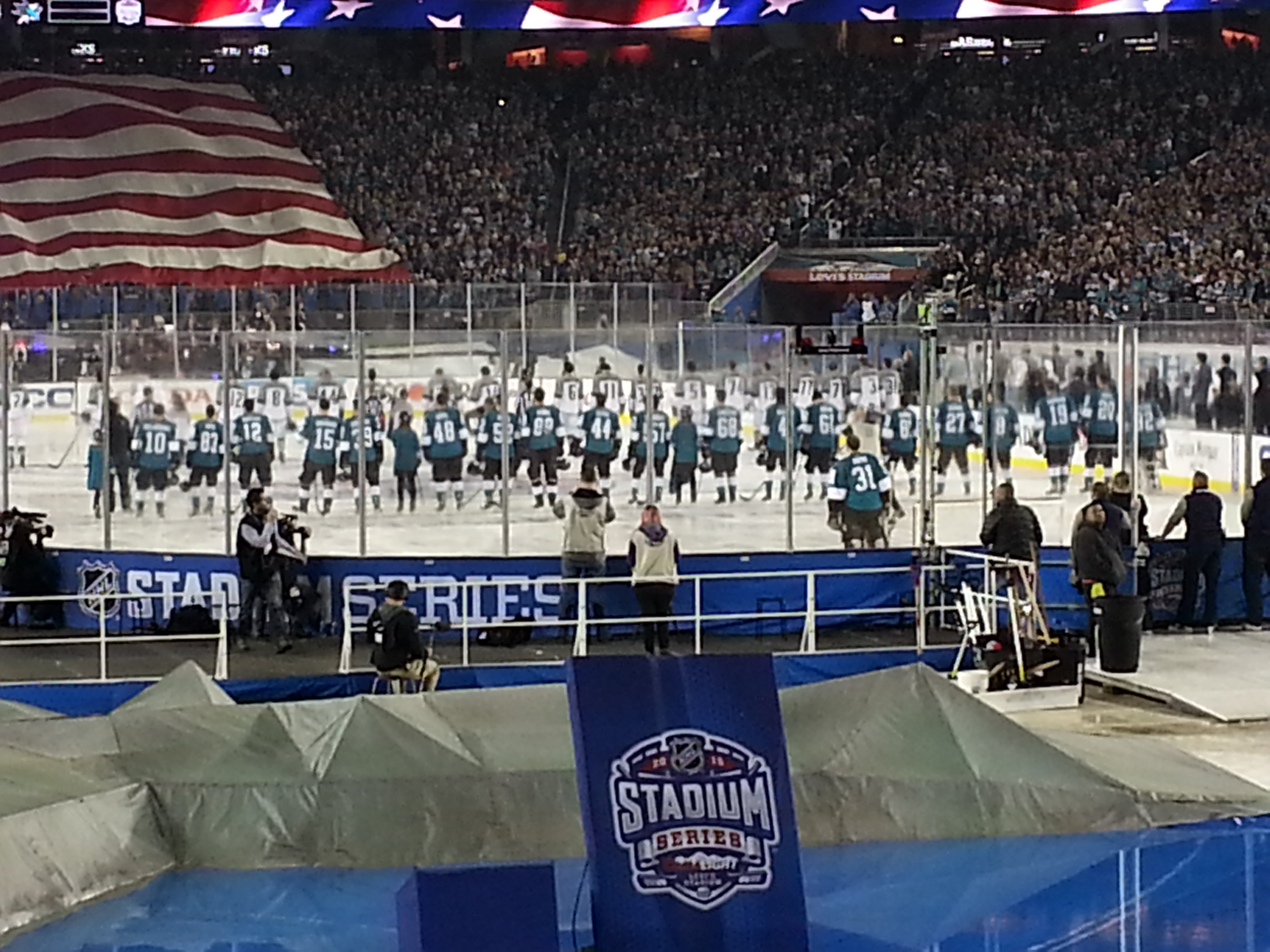
The Kings and Sharks players during the pre-game national anthem.

== Initial announcement ==
After the success of the 2014 NHL Stadium Series game at Dodger Stadium, it was widely rumored that there was going to be an outdoor game in Northern California with Levi's Stadium, AT&T Park and Stanford Stadium as the three most likely options to host the outdoor game. On August 6, 2014, it was officially announced that Levi's Stadium was going to host the game between the Sharks and the Kings. The NHL was originally reportedly looking to hold four outdoor games, including the Winter Classic. Besides Levi's Stadium, other possible sites for the Stadium Series games included Coors Field (Denver), Gillette Stadium (Foxborough, Massachusetts), Target Field (Minneapolis), Beaver Stadium (Pennsylvania State University), and an as-yet-unnamed venue in the Phoenix area. Foxborough, Minneapolis and Denver will instead host 2016 outdoor contests.

== Game summary ==
Feb 21, 2015	Los Angeles Kings	2–1	San Jose Sharks	Levi's Stadium	Recap

Kings goalie Jonathan Quick stopped 31 of 32 shots in the win. Kyle Clifford got Los Angeles on the board first at 2:46 in the first period. Brent Burns then scored the equalizer for the Sharks at 18:56 late in the first period. After a scoreless second period, Marian Gaborik scored at 4:04 in the third period in what proved to be the game-winning goal for the Kings.

Scoring summary
Period	Team	Goal	Assist(s)	Time	Score
1st	LAK	Kyle Clifford (3)	Jake Muzzin (21)	2:46	1–0 LAK
1st	SJS	Brent Burns (16)	Tommy Wingels (15)	18:56	1–1
2nd	No scoring				
3rd	LAK	Marian Gaborik (17)	Jeff Carter (28)	4:04	2–1 LAK

Number in parentheses represents the player's total in goals or assists to that point of the season

Penalty summary
Period	Team	Player	Penalty	Time	PIM
1st	SJS	Brenden Dillon	Holding	6:33	2:00
2nd	LAK	Robyn Regehr	Hooking	7:24	2:00
2nd	SJS	Matt Irwin	Hooking	13:06	2:00
2nd	LAK	Jake Muzzin	Delaying Game Puck over glass	18:54	2:00
3rd	LAK	Dustin Brown	Tripping	10:06	2:00

Shots by period
Team	1	2	3	Total
Los Angeles	12	6	11	29
San Jose	10	15	7	32

Power play opportunities
Team	Goals/Opportunities
Los Angeles	0/2
San Jose	0/3

Three star selections
	Team	Player	Statistics
1st	LAK	Jonathan Quick	31 saves
2nd	SJS	Brent Burns	1 goal
3rd	LAK	Marian Gaborik	1 goal

== Team rosters ==
Los Angeles Kings
#		Player	Position
2	(United States)	Matt Greene (A)	D
3	(Canada)	Brayden McNabb	D
5	(United States)	Jamie McBain	D
6	(Canada)	Jake Muzzin	D
8	(Canada)	Drew Doughty	D
11	(Slovenia)	Anze Kopitar (A)	C
12	(Slovakia)	Marian Gaborik	RW
13	(Canada)	Kyle Clifford	LW
14	(Canada)	Justin Williams	RW
22	(United States)	Trevor Lewis	C
23	(United States)	Dustin Brown (C)	C
28	(Canada)	Jarret Stoll	C
31	(Canada)	Martin Jones	G
32	(United States)	Jonathan Quick	G
37	(United States)	Nick Shore	C
44	(Canada)	Robyn Regehr	D
71	(Canada)	Jordan Nolan	C
73	(Canada)	Tyler Toffoli	C
74	(Canada)	Dwight King	LW
77	(Canada)	Jeff Carter	C
Head coach: (Canada) Darryl Sutter

San Jose Sharks
#		Player	Position
4	(Canada)	Brenden Dillon	D
8	(United States)	Joe Pavelski (A)	C
10	(Canada)	Andrew Desjardins	C
12	(Canada)	Patrick Marleau (A)	LW
15	(Canada)	James Sheppard	LW
19	(Canada)	Joe Thornton	C
20	(Canada)	John Scott	LW
27	(Canada)	Scott Hannan	D
31	(Finland)	Antti Niemi	G
32	(United States)	Alex Stalock	G
39	(Canada)	Logan Couture	C
44	(Canada)	Marc-Edouard Vlasic (A)	D
48	(Czech Republic)	Tomas Hertl	C
52	(Canada)	Matt Irwin	D
57	(United States)	Tommy Wingels	C
61	(United States)	Justin Braun	D
68	(Sweden)	Melker Karlsson	C
81	(Canada)	Tyler Kennedy	RW
83	(United States)	Matt Nieto	LW
88	(Canada)	Brent Burns	D
Head coach: (Canada) Todd McLellan

Martin Jones and Alex Stalock dressed as the back up goaltenders. Neither entered the game.

=== Scratches ===
- Los Angeles Kings: Andy Andreoff, Alec Martinez, Derek Forbort
- San Jose Sharks: Mirco Muller, Chris Tierney, Barclay Goodrow

=== Officials ===
- Referees — Dan O'Halloran, Gord Dwyer
- Linesmen — Steve Barton, David Brisebois

=== Pregame/Anthem/Entertainment ===
Before puck-drop Kris Allen and the Symphony Silicon Valley performed and sang the anthem

Melissa Etheridge performed during the second intermission

== See also ==
- NHL Winter Classic
- NHL Heritage Classic
- List of outdoor ice hockey games
- 2014 NHL Stadium Series
- Kings–Sharks rivalry
