= Frozen Fury =

Annual pre-season ice hockey game

Frozen Fury was an annual pre-season ice hockey game hosted by the Los Angeles Kings of the National Hockey League (NHL), which was held in Salt Lake City from 2021 to 2023. A previous incarnation of the series was held between the Kings and the Colorado Avalanche in Las Vegas from 1997 to 2016. On four occasions, the Kings faced different teams instead of the Avalanche; once each against the Arizona Coyotes, the San Jose Sharks, New York Rangers, and the Dallas Stars. The 15th Frozen Fury was originally supposed to take place on September 29, 2012, but was cancelled due to the 2012–13 NHL lockout. It resumed September 27–28, 2013, with the New York Rangers making their debut in the series.

The first game to be played in Las Vegas was also the first outdoor game in the league's history: 14,000 fans came to a rink set up outside Caesars Palace to see the Kings defeat the New York Rangers 5–2 on September 28, 1991. The air temperature was 85 °F (29 °C) during the game. The game served as a predecessor to both the Frozen Fury series (which was played indoors) and the NHL Winter Classic, the annual regular season game held on New Year's Day that began in 2008.

From 1997 to 2015, these games were played at MGM Grand Garden Arena; in 2016, they were played at T-Mobile Arena. The 2016 games were the end of the original tradition, due to the launch of the Vegas Golden Knights in the 2017–18 season.

In 2021, a new Frozen Fury series was launched at the then-Vivint Arena in Salt Lake City between the Kings and the Vegas Golden Knights; the Sharks then rejoined the series in 2023. This series was concluded following the 2023–24 season, with Salt Lake City receiving the expansion Utah Mammoth.

== The games ==
=== Frozen Fury I (1997) ===
September 20	Los Angeles Kings	4–3 OT	Colorado Avalanche	Recap

Scoring summary

Period	Team	Goal	Assist(s)	Time	Score
1st	COL	Josef Marha	Brent Severyn, Eric Messier	13:13	1–0 COL
2nd	LAK	Roman Vopat (PP)	Brad Smyth, Rob Blake	2:06	1–1
2nd	COL	Eric Messier	Jari Kurri, Joe Sakic	14:51	2–1 COL
3rd	LAK	Olli Jokinen (PP)	Luc Robitaille, Ray Ferraro	4:12	2–2
3rd	LAK	Craig Johnson	Rob Blake	12:27	3–2 LAK
3rd	COL	Joe Sakic	Peter Forsberg, Claude Lemieux	19:20	3–3
OT	LAK	Donald MacLean	Doug Zmolek, Jan Vopat	2:51	4–3 LAK

=== Frozen Fury II (1998) ===
September 19	Los Angeles Kings	3–2	Colorado Avalanche	Recap

September 20	Colorado Avalanche	5–4	Los Angeles Kings	Recap

=== Frozen Fury III (1999) ===
September 11	Los Angeles Kings	4–0	Phoenix Coyotes	Recap

=== Frozen Fury IV (2000) ===
September 30	Colorado Avalanche	5–4	Los Angeles Kings	Recap

=== Frozen Fury V (2001) ===
September 22	Los Angeles Kings	4–3	San Jose Sharks	Recap

=== Frozen Fury VI (2002) ===
October 5	Los Angeles Kings	6–5	Colorado Avalanche	Recap

=== Frozen Fury VII (2003) ===
September 23	Los Angeles Kings	3–1	Colorado Avalanche	Recap

=== Frozen Fury VIII (2005) ===
September 24	Colorado Avalanche	2–1 OT	Los Angeles Kings	Recap

=== Frozen Fury IX (2006) ===
September 23	Los Angeles Kings	3–2	Colorado Avalanche	Recap

=== Frozen Fury X (2007) ===
September 22	Los Angeles Kings	3–2 SO	Colorado Avalanche	Recap

=== Frozen Fury XI (2008) ===
September 27	Colorado Avalanche	4–3 SO	Los Angeles Kings	Recap

=== Frozen Fury XII (2009) ===
September 26	Los Angeles Kings	5–3	Colorado Avalanche	Recap

=== Frozen Fury XIII (2010) ===
October 2	Los Angeles Kings	3–2	Colorado Avalanche	Recap

=== Frozen Fury XIV (2011) ===
October 1	Colorado Avalanche	4–1	Los Angeles Kings	Recap

=== Frozen Fury XV (2013) ===
September 27	Los Angeles Kings	4–1	New York Rangers	Recap

Scoring summary

Period	Team	Goal	Assist(s)	Time	Score
1st	LAK	Anze Kopitar	Drew Doughty, Justin Williams	0:15	1–0 LAK
1st	LAK	Jeff Carter (PP)	Mike Richards, Matt Frattin	11:39	2–0 LAK
1st	NYR	J. T. Miller	Anton Stralman, Oscar Lindberg	14:06	2–1 LAK
1st	LAK	Mike Richards (PP)	Unassisted	17:27	3–1 LAK
2nd	LAK	Trevor Lewis	Jarret Stoll, Robyn Regehr	16:15	4–1 LAK
3rd		No scoring this period			

September 28	Colorado Avalanche	3–2	Los Angeles Kings	Recap

Scoring summary

Period	Team	Goal	Assist(s)	Time	Score
1st	LAK	Mike Richards (PP)	Unassisted	16:38	1–0 LAK
2nd	LAK	Mike Richards (2) (PP)	Matt Frattin, Jarret Stoll	0:14	2–0 LAK
2nd	COL	Ryan O'Reilly	Steve Downie, Matt Duchene	8:11	2–1 LAK
2nd	COL	Gabriel Landeskog	Alex Tanguay, Andre Benoit	12:58	2–2
2nd	COL	Gabriel Landeskog (2) (PP)	Andre Benoit, Paul Stastny	16:06	3–2 COL
3rd		No scoring this period			

=== Frozen Fury XVI (2014) ===
October 4	Colorado Avalanche	3–2 SO	Los Angeles Kings	Recap

=== Frozen Fury XVII (2015) ===
October 3	Los Angeles Kings	4–0	Colorado Avalanche	Recap
None		Scoring stats	Dustin Brown, Kyle Clifford; Trevor Lewis; Marian Gaborik
Reto Berra (28 saves)		Goalie stats	Jonathan Quick (14 saves)

=== Frozen Fury XVIII (2016) ===
October 7	Dallas Stars	6–3	Los Angeles Kings	Recap

October 8	Colorado Avalanche	2–1 OT	Los Angeles Kings	Recap

=== Frozen Fury SLC I (2021) ===
September 30	Vegas Golden Knights	1–3	Los Angeles Kings	Recap

Scoring summary

Period	Team	Goal	Assist(s)	Time	Score
1st	LAK	Brendan Lemieux	Austin Strand	1:45	1–0 LAK
2nd	LAK	Lias Andersson	Gabriel Vilardi, Vladimir Tkachev	1:48	2–0 LAK
3rd	VGK	Daniil Miromanov	Nicolas Roy	4:30	2–1 LAK
3rd	LAK	Arthur Kaliyev (PP)	Quinton Byfield, Vladimir Tkachev	9:35	3–1 LAK

=== Frozen Fury SLC II (2022) ===
October 6	Vegas Golden Knights	6–4	Los Angeles Kings	Recap

Scoring summary

Period	Team	Goal	Assist(s)	Time	Score
1st	LAK	Kevin Fiala	Adrian Kempe, Sean Durzi	1:52	1–0 LAK
1st	LAK	Gabriel Vilardi	Trevor Moore, Brandt Clarke	6:09	2–0 LAK
1st	VGK	Reilly Smith	Brayden McNabb, Jack Eichel	16:36	2–1 LAK
2nd	VGK	Brayden McNabb	Jack Eichel	5:14	2–2
2nd	VGK	Chandler Stephenson	Mark Stone, Reilly Smith	11:15	3–2 VGK
2nd	VGK	Jonathan Marchessault	Shea Theodore	17:43	4–2 VGK
3rd	LAK	Trevor Moore (PP)	Arthur Kaliyev, Sean Durzi	2:21	4–3 VGK
3rd	VGK	Reilly Smith (2) (PP)	Mark Stone, Chandler Stephenson	8:37	5–3 VGK
3rd	LAK	Sean Durzi (PP)	Arthur Kaliyev, Phillip Danault	15:51	5–4 VGK
3rd	VGK	Alex Pietrangelo (EN)	Unassisted	18:52	6–4 VGK

=== Frozen Fury SLC III (2023) ===
October 5	San Jose Sharks	3–4 OT	Los Angeles Kings	Recap

Scoring summary

Period	Team	Goal	Assist(s)	Time	Score
1st	LAK	Pierre-Luc Dubois	Kevin Fiala, Vladislav Gavrikov	8:27	1–0 LAK
1st	SJS	Alexander Barabanov (PP)	Mikael Granlund, Anthony Duclair	8:27	1–1
2nd	LAK	Anze Kopitar	Drew Doughty	8:16	2–1 LAK
2nd	SJS	Mike Hoffman	Tomas Hertl, Mackenzie Blackwood	14:45	2–2
3rd	LAK	Trevor Moore	Viktor Arvidsson, Phillip Danault	3:28	3–2 LAK
3rd	SJS	Thomas Bordeleau	William Eklund	14:15	3–3
OT	LAK	Adrian Kempe	Anze Kopitar, Drew Doughty	0:17	4–3 LAK

=== Frozen Fury SLC IV (2024) ===
Intended to be the third meeting between Los Angeles and Vegas, the game was originally scheduled for September 23, 2024. However, it was officially cancelled on June 20, 2024, due to the Salt Lake City-based Utah Hockey Club entering the NHL. The game was replaced by a matchup between the Kings and the Utah Hockey Club (later the Utah Mammoth) on the same date, without the Frozen Fury branding.

== Records ==
Team	Games	Wins	Losses	Win %
Los Angeles Kings	24	14	10	.583
Colorado Avalanche	16	7	9	.438
Vegas Golden Knights	2	1	1	.500
San Jose Sharks	2	0	2	.000
Dallas Stars	1	1	0	1.000
Arizona Coyotes	1	0	1	.000
New York Rangers	1	0	1	.000
