= 2016 NHL Stadium Series =

Outdoor National Hockey League game

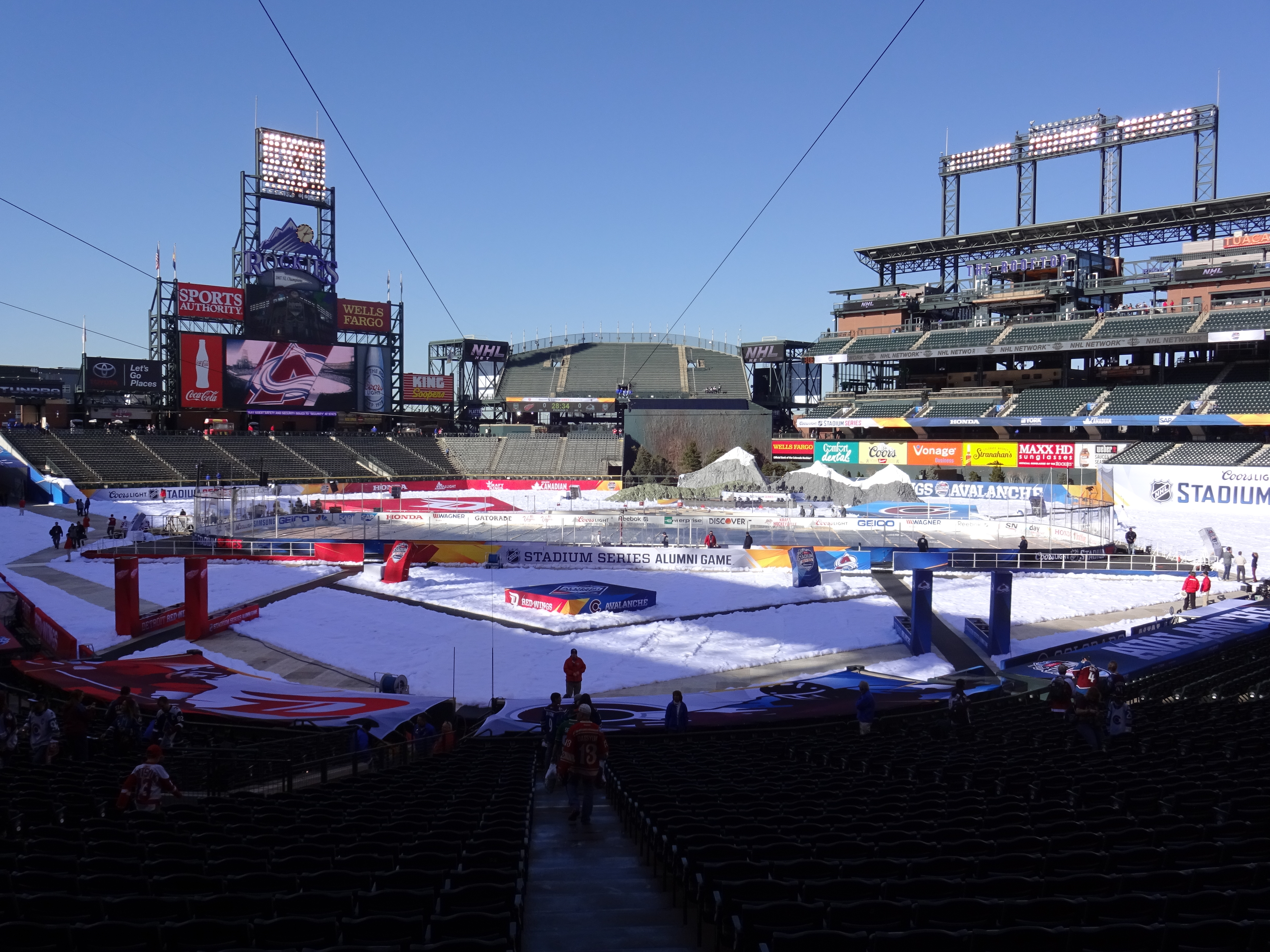
- Coors Field set up for game

TCF Bank Stadium
- Game one: Chicago Blackhawks at Minnesota Wild

Coors Field
- Game two: Detroit Red Wings at Colorado Avalanche
- Total attendance: 100,521

The 2016 NHL Stadium Series (branded as the 2016 Coors Light NHL Stadium Series for sponsorship reasons) was a series of two outdoor regular season National Hockey League (NHL) games played during the 2015–16 NHL season. The 2016 Stadium Series consisted of the Minnesota Wild versus the Chicago Blackhawks at TCF Bank Stadium in Minneapolis on February 21, 2016, and the Colorado Avalanche versus the Detroit Red Wings at Coors Field in Denver on February 27, 2016.

NBC aired both games in the United States, with the first game at TCF Bank Stadium being part of its Hockey Day in America coverage. The second game at Coors Field aired on NBC in primetime, the fourth regular season game (and the third outdoor game) to air on NBC's broadcast network in primetime (after the 2011 NHL Winter Classic, the 2014 NHL Stadium Series Game in Chicago, and a game on February 28, 2015 between the New York Rangers and the Philadelphia Flyers) since NBC won the broadcast contract for the NHL in 2004. In Canada, the game at TCF Bank Stadium was the first game of a tripleheader on Sportsnet (simulcast from the NBC feed), while the game at Coors Field aired as part of the Hockey Night in Canada coverage on Sportsnet.

== TCF Bank Stadium (February 21) ==
2016 NHL Stadium Series: Minnesota
	1	2	3	Total
Chicago Blackhawks	0	0	1	1
Minnesota Wild	2	2	2	6
- Date: February 21, 2016
- Venue: TCF Bank Stadium
- City: Minneapolis
- Attendance: 50,426

The Minnesota Wild defeated the Chicago Blackhawks, 6–1 in the first 2016 Stadium Series game. Jason Pominville and Erik Haula each recorded a goal and two assists for the Wild. Minnesota goalie Devan Dubnyk made 31 saves, only allowing one goal by Patrick Kane with 7:55 left in the game. Also scoring for Minnesota was Thomas Vanek, Nino Niederreiter, Matt Dumba, and Ryan Carter.

Scoring summary
Period	Team	Goal	Assist(s)	Time	Score
1st	MIN	Matt Dumba (9)	Ryan Carter (3), Justin Fontaine (8)	3:25	1–0 MIN
1st	MIN	Thomas Vanek (17)	Jason Pominville (17), Mike Reilly (3)	7:10	2–0 MIN
2nd	MIN	Nino Niederreiter (11)	Erik Haula (12), Jason Pominville (18)	2:26	3–0 MIN
2nd	MIN	Jason Pominville (9)	Nino Niederreiter (9), Erik Haula (13)	10:26	4–0 MIN
3rd	MIN	Ryan Carter (6)	Marco Scandella (10), Jarret Stoll (5)	2:25	5–0 MIN
3rd	CHI	Patrick Kane (35)	Trevor van Riemsdyk (6), Jonathan Toews (22)	12:05	5–1 MIN
3rd	MIN	Erik Haula (7) (empty net)	Unassisted	13:49	6–1 MIN

Number in parentheses represents the player's total in goals or assists to that point of the season

Penalty summary
Period	Team	Player	Penalty	Time	PIM
1st	MIN	Matt Dumba	Roughing	5:17	2:00
1st	CHI	Phillip Danault	Interference	5:17	2:00
1st	CHI	Phillip Danault	Roughing	5:17	2:00
1st	CHI	Jonathan Toews	Interference	10:15	2:00
1st	MIN	Zach Parise	Cross-checking	15:07	2:00
1st	CHI	Brent Seabrook	Holding	19:08	2:00
2nd	CHI	Corey Crawford (served by Andrew Shaw)	Tripping	6:37	2:00
2nd	MIN	Ryan Carter	Roughing	13:15	2:00
2nd	CHI	Michal Rozsival	Interference	15:14	5:00
2nd	CHI	Michal Rozsival	Game misconduct	15:14	10:00
2nd	MIN	Mikko Koivu	Slashing	15:48	2:00
3rd	CHI	Andrew Shaw	Roughing	13:13	2:00
3rd	MIN	Ryan Carter	Roughing	13:13	2:00

Three star selections
	Team	Player	Statistics
1st	MIN	Erik Haula	1 goal, 2 assists
2nd	MIN	Ryan Carter	1 goal, 1 assist
3rd	MIN	Jason Pominville	1 goal, 2 assists

== Coors Field (February 27) ==
2016 NHL Stadium Series: Colorado
	1	2	3	Total
Detroit Red Wings	1	0	4	5
Colorado Avalanche	2	0	1	3
- Date: February 27, 2016
- Venue: Coors Field
- City: Denver
- Attendance: 50,095

In the second Stadium Series game, Brad Richards scored with 1:00 left in the game to break a 3–3 tie, and Darren Helm added an empty net goal, to give the Detroit Red Wings a 5–3 victory over the Colorado Avalanche. Also, teams switched ends midway through the third period due to heavy wind.

Scoring summary
Period	Team	Goal	Assist(s)	Time	Score
1st	DET	Tomas Tatar (17)	Unassisted	5:07	1–0 DET
1st	COL	Nathan MacKinnon (20)	Gabriel Landeskog (27)	7:44	1–1
1st	COL	Tyson Barrie (11)	Blake Comeau (20), Mikhail Grigorenko (16)	14:38	2–1 COL
2nd	No scoring				
3rd	DET	Gustav Nyquist (15)	Riley Sheahan (7), Tomas Tatar (18)	1:27	2–2
3rd	DET	Justin Abdelkader (15)	Darren Helm (10), Luke Glendening (10)	13:28	3–2 DET
3rd	COL	Alex Tanguay (4)	Gabriel Landeskog (28), Nathan MacKinnon (27)	13:42	3–3
3rd	DET	Brad Richards (7)	Niklas Kronwall (15)	19:00	4–3 DET
3rd	DET	Darren Helm (8) (empty net)	Petr Mrazek (2), Niklas Kronwall (16)	19:40	5–3 DET

Number in parentheses represents the player's total in goals or assists to that point of the season

Penalty summary
Period	Team	Player	Penalty	Time	PIM
1st	COL	Andrew Bodnarchuk	High-sticking	10:17	2:00
1st	COL	Cody McLeod	High-sticking	14:49	4:00
1st	DET	Pavel Datsyuk	Roughing	18:54	2:00
1st	COL	Gabriel Landeskog	Holding	18:54	2:00
2nd	DET	Danny DeKeyser	High-sticking	4:01	2:00
2nd	COL	Chris Bigras	Holding	10:14	2:00
2nd	DET	Team (served by Andreas Athanasiou)	Too Many Men on Ice	13:20	2:00
3rd	COL	Blake Comeau	Tripping	8:22	2:00
3rd	DET	Mike Green	Tripping	14:39	2:00

Three star selections
	Team	Player	Statistics
1st	DET	Brad Richards	1 goal
2nd	DET	Tomas Tatar	1 goal, 1 assist
3rd	COL	Nathan MacKinnon	1 goal, 1 assist
