= Cold War II (disambiguation) =

The Second Cold War refers to ongoing geopolitical tensions in 21st century. It may also refer to:

- Cold War (1979–1985), the second phase of the Cold War between the Eastern and Western Blocs, sometimes labelled the "Second Cold War"
- Cold War 2 (film), a 2016 film
- The Big Chill at the Big House, an ice hockey game also known as Cold War II
