= List of ice hockey games with highest attendance =

This is a list of ice hockey games with the highest attendance on record. All of the games on this list were held in stadiums designed for field sports such as association football, gridiron football, and baseball. Four of the "games" listed were actually doubleheaders, in which a single ticket provided admission to two games held back-to-back. The fixed-roof Ford Field in Detroit hosted one doubleheader and a single game, and another was held at the retractable-roof Veltins-Arena in Gelsenkirchen, Germany (with the roof closed for that game); all other games on the list were held in open-air venues. Most of these games were staged as special events, and all but one were played in the 21st century.

Attendance in the 30,000 range was once quite common for major international matches held outdoors in the 1940s and 50s in Moscow's Lenin Stadium. Figures of this type are still common in bandy, a relative of ice hockey played outdoors.

The record for a Stanley Cup playoff game, as well as for an NHL game played in a teams' regular home stadium, is 28,183, which was set on April 23, 1996, at the Thunderdome during a Tampa Bay Lightning – Philadelphia Flyers game.

A new record was set on December 11, 2010, when the University of Michigan's men's ice hockey team faced cross-state rival Michigan State in an event billed as "The Big Chill at the Big House". The game was played at Michigan's football venue, Michigan Stadium in Ann Arbor, with a capacity of 109,901, as of the 2010 football season. Ultimately, a crowd announced by the University of Michigan as 113,411, at that time the largest in the stadium's history (including football), saw the homestanding Wolverines win 5–0. Guinness World Records, using a count of ticketed fans who actually entered the stadium instead of UM's figure of tickets sold, announced a final figure of 104,173.

| Rank | Attendance | Location | Date | Event | Home team | Final score | Visiting team |
|---|---|---|---|---|---|---|---|
| 1 | 113,411 (announced); 104,173 (certified) | (United States) Michigan Stadium, Ann Arbor | December 11, 2010 | The Big Chill at the Big House | Michigan Wolverines (men) | 5–0 | Michigan State Spartans (men) |
| 2 | 105,491 (announced) < 104,173 (certified) | (United States) Michigan Stadium, Ann Arbor | January 1, 2014 | 2014 NHL Winter Classic | Detroit Red Wings | 2–3 (SO) | Toronto Maple Leafs |
| 3 | 94,751 | (United States) Ohio Stadium, Columbus, Ohio | March 1, 2025 | 2025 NHL Stadium Series | Columbus Blue Jackets | 5–3 | Detroit Red Wings |
| 4 | 85,630 | (United States) Cotton Bowl, Dallas | January 1, 2020 | 2020 NHL Winter Classic | Dallas Stars | 4–2 | Nashville Predators |
| 5 | 79,690 | (United States) MetLife Stadium, East Rutherford | February 18, 2024 | 2024 NHL Stadium Series | New York Islanders | 5–6 (OT) | New York Rangers |
| 6 | 77,803 | (Germany) Veltins-Arena, Gelsenkirchen | May 7, 2010 | 2010 IIHF World Championship | United States | 1–2 (OT) | Germany |
| 7 | 76,126 | (United States) Notre Dame Stadium, Notre Dame, Indiana | Jan 1, 2019 | 2019 NHL Winter Classic | Chicago Blackhawks | 2–4 | Boston Bruins |
| 8 | 74,575 | (United States) Beaver Stadium, State College | January 31, 2026 | Hockey Valley in Beaver Stadium | Penn State Nittany Lions (men) | 4-5 (OT) | Michigan State Spartans (men) |
| 9 | 74,554 | (United States) Spartan Stadium, East Lansing | October 6, 2001 | Cold War | Michigan State Spartans (men) | 3–3 | Michigan Wolverines (men) |
| 10 | 71,381 | (Russia) Gazprom Arena, Saint Petersburg | December 16, 2018 | Euro Hockey Tour | Russia | 5–0 | Finland |
| 11 | 71,217 | (United States) Ralph Wilson Stadium, Orchard Park | January 1, 2008 | 2008 NHL Winter Classic | Buffalo Sabres | 1–2 (SO) | Pittsburgh Penguins |
| 12 | 70,328 | (United States) MetLife Stadium, East Rutherford | February 17, 2024 | 2024 NHL Stadium Series | New Jersey Devils | 6–3 | Philadelphia Flyers |
| 13 | 70,205 | (United States) Levi's Stadium, Santa Clara, California | February 21, 2015 | 2015 NHL Stadium Series | San Jose Sharks | 1–2 | Los Angeles Kings |
| 14 | 69,620 | (United States) Lincoln Financial Field, Philadelphia | February 23, 2019 | 2019 NHL Stadium Series | Philadelphia Flyers | 4–3 (OT) | Pittsburgh Penguins |
| 15 | 68,619 | (United States) Nissan Stadium, Nashville | February 26, 2022 | 2022 NHL Stadium Series | Nashville Predators | 2–3 | Tampa Bay Lightning |
| 16 | 68,111 | (United States) Heinz Field, Pittsburgh | January 1, 2011 | 2011 NHL Winter Classic | Pittsburgh Penguins | 1–3 | Washington Capitals |
| 17 | 67,877 | (Russia) Gazprom Arena, Saint Petersburg | December 15, 2019 | Euro Hockey Tour | Russia | 2–0 | Finland |
| 18 | 67,770 | (Russia) Gazprom Arena, Saint Petersburg | December 22, 2018 | Hockey Classic St. Petersburg 2018 | SKA St. Petersburg | 1–4 | HC CSKA Moscow |
| 19 | 67,318 | (United States) Heinz Field, Pittsburgh | February 25, 2017 | 2017 NHL Stadium Series | Pittsburgh Penguins | 4–2 | Philadelphia Flyers |
| 20 | 67,246 | (United States) Gillette Stadium, Foxborough | January 1, 2016 | 2016 NHL Winter Classic | Boston Bruins | 1–5 | Montreal Canadiens |
| 21 | 62,921 | (United States) Soldier Field, Chicago | March 1, 2014 | 2014 NHL Stadium Series | Chicago Blackhawks | 5–1 | Pittsburgh Penguins |
| 22 | 57,167 | (Canada) Commonwealth Stadium, Edmonton | November 22, 2003 | 2003 Heritage Classic | Edmonton Oilers | 3–4 | Montreal Canadiens |
| 23 | 56,961 | (United States) Carter-Finley Stadium, Raleigh | February 18, 2023 | 2023 NHL Stadium Series | Carolina Hurricanes | 4–1 | Washington Capitals |
| 24 | 55,411 | (Canada) Commonwealth Stadium, Edmonton | October 29, 2023 | 2023 NHL Heritage Classic | Edmonton Oilers | 5–2 | Calgary Flames |
| 25 | 55,031 | (United States) Camp Randall Stadium, Madison | February 6, 2010 | Camp Randall Hockey Classic | Wisconsin Badgers (women) | 6–1 | Bemidji State Beavers (women) |
| 25 | 55,031 | (United States) Camp Randall Stadium, Madison | February 6, 2010 | Camp Randall Hockey Classic | Wisconsin Badgers (men) | 3–2 | Michigan Wolverines (men) |
| 26 | 55,000 | (Soviet Union) Lenin Stadium, Moscow | March 5, 1957 | 1957 Ice Hockey World Championships | Soviet Union | 4–4 | Sweden |
| 27 | 54,194 | (Canada) BC Place, Vancouver | March 2, 2014 | 2014 NHL Heritage Classic | Vancouver Canucks | 2–4 | Ottawa Senators |
| 28 | 54,099 | (United States) Dodger Stadium, Los Angeles | January 25, 2014 | 2014 NHL Stadium Series | Los Angeles Kings | 0–3 | Anaheim Ducks |
| 29 | 52,051 | (United States) Soldier Field, Chicago | February 17, 2013 | OfficeMax Hockey City Classic | Notre Dame Fighting Irish (men) | 2–1 | Miami RedHawks (men) |
| 29 | 52,051 | (United States) Soldier Field, Chicago | February 17, 2013 | OfficeMax Hockey City Classic | Wisconsin Badgers (men) | 3–2 | Minnesota Golden Gophers (men) |
| 30 | 51,125 | (Germany) ESPRIT arena, Düsseldorf | January 10, 2015 | 2015 DEL Winter Game | Düsseldorfer EG | 3–2 | Kölner Haie |
| 31 | 50,426 | (United States) TCF Bank Stadium, Minneapolis | February 21, 2016 | 2016 NHL Stadium Series | Minnesota Wild | 6–1 | Chicago Blackhawks |
| 32 | 50,105 | (United States) Yankee Stadium, New York City | January 26, 2014 | 2014 NHL Stadium Series | New Jersey Devils | 3–7 | New York Rangers |
| 33 | 50,095 | (United States) Coors Field, Denver | February 27, 2016 | 2016 NHL Stadium Series | Colorado Avalanche | 3–5 | Detroit Red Wings |
| 34 | 50,027 | (United States) Yankee Stadium, New York City | January 29, 2014 | 2014 NHL Stadium Series | New York Islanders | 1–2 | New York Rangers |
| 35 | 50,000 | (Germany) Stadion Nürnberg, Nuremberg | January 5, 2013 | 2013 DEL Winter Game | Thomas Sabo Ice Tigers | 4–3 | Eisbären Berlin |
| 36 | 47,313 | (United States) T-Mobile Park, Seattle | January 1, 2024 | 2024 NHL Winter Classic | Seattle Kraken | 3–0 | Vegas Golden Knights |
| 37 | 47,011 | (Germany) RheinEnergieStadion, Cologne | January 12, 2019 | 2019 DEL Winter Game | Kölner Haie | 2–3 (OT) | Düsseldorfer EG |
| 38 | 46,967 | (United States) Citizens Bank Park, Philadelphia | January 2, 2012 | 2012 NHL Winter Classic | Philadelphia Flyers | 2–3 | New York Rangers |
| 39 | 46,556 | (United States) Busch Stadium, St. Louis | January 2, 2017 | 2017 NHL Winter Classic | St. Louis Blues | 4–1 | Chicago Blackhawks |
| 40 | 45,808 | (United States) Citizens Bank Park, Philadelphia | December 31, 2011 | NHL Winter Classic Alumni Game | Philadelphia Flyers Alumni | 3–1 | New York Rangers Alumni |
| 41 | 45,653 | (United States) Citizens Bank Park, Philadelphia | January 6, 2012 | 2012 AHL Outdoor Classic | Adirondack Phantoms | 4–3 (OT) | Hershey Bears |
| 42 | 45,523 | (United States) FirstEnergy Stadium, Cleveland | February 18, 2023 | Faceoff on the Lake | Ohio State Buckeyes (men) | 4–2 | Michigan Wolverines (men) |
| 43 | 45,021 | (United States) TCF Stadium, Minneapolis | January 17, 2014 | 2014 Hockey City Classic | Minnesota Gophers (men) | 1–0 | Ohio State Buckeyes (men) |
| 44 | 44,592 | (United States) Ralph Wilson Stadium, Orchard Park | December 29, 2017 | 2018 World Junior Ice Hockey Championships | United States | 4–3 (SO) | Canada |
| 45 | 42,832 | (United States) Nationals Park, Washington, D.C. | January 1, 2015 | 2015 NHL Winter Classic | Washington Capitals | 3–2 | Chicago Blackhawks |
| 46 | 41,022 | (Canada) McMahon Stadium, Calgary | February 20, 2011 | 2011 Heritage Classic | Calgary Flames | 4–0 | Montreal Canadiens |
| 47 | 40,933 | (United States) Wrigley Field, Chicago | December 31, 2024 | 2025 NHL Winter Classic | Chicago Blackhawks | 2–6 | St. Louis Blues |
| 48 | 40,890 | (United States) Lambeau Field, Green Bay | February 13, 2006 | Frozen Tundra Hockey Classic | Wisconsin Badgers (men) | 4–2 | Ohio State Buckeyes (men) |
| 49 | 40,818 | (United States) Wrigley Field, Chicago | January 1, 2009 | 2009 NHL Winter Classic | Chicago Blackhawks | 4–6 | Detroit Red Wings |
| 50 | 40,163 | (Germany) RheinEnergieStadion, Cologne | December 3, 2022 | 2022 DEL Winter Game | Kölner Haie | 4–2 | Adler Mannheim |

== Image gallery ==
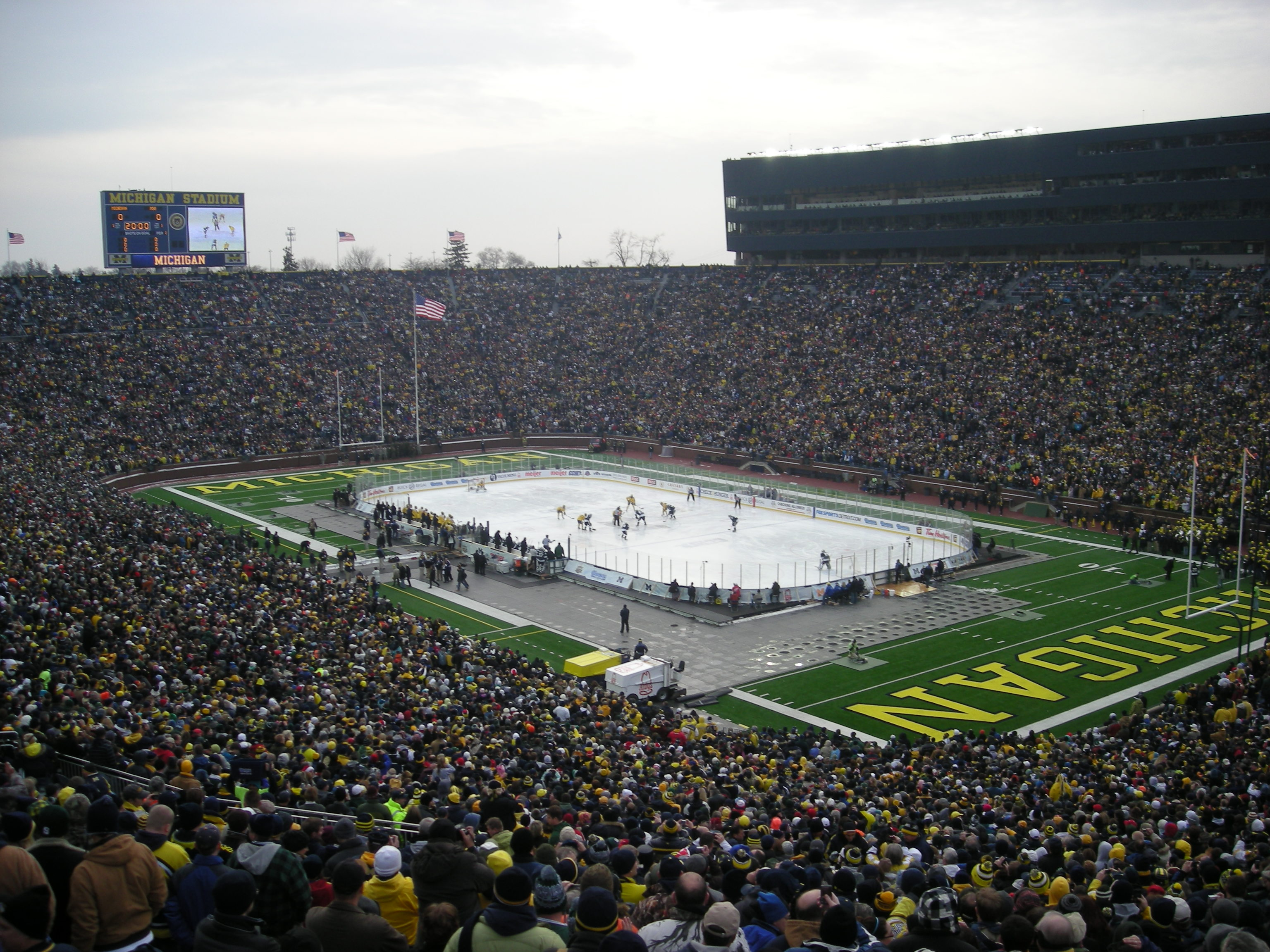
The Big Chill at the Big House, the highest ever attendance of an ice hockey game.

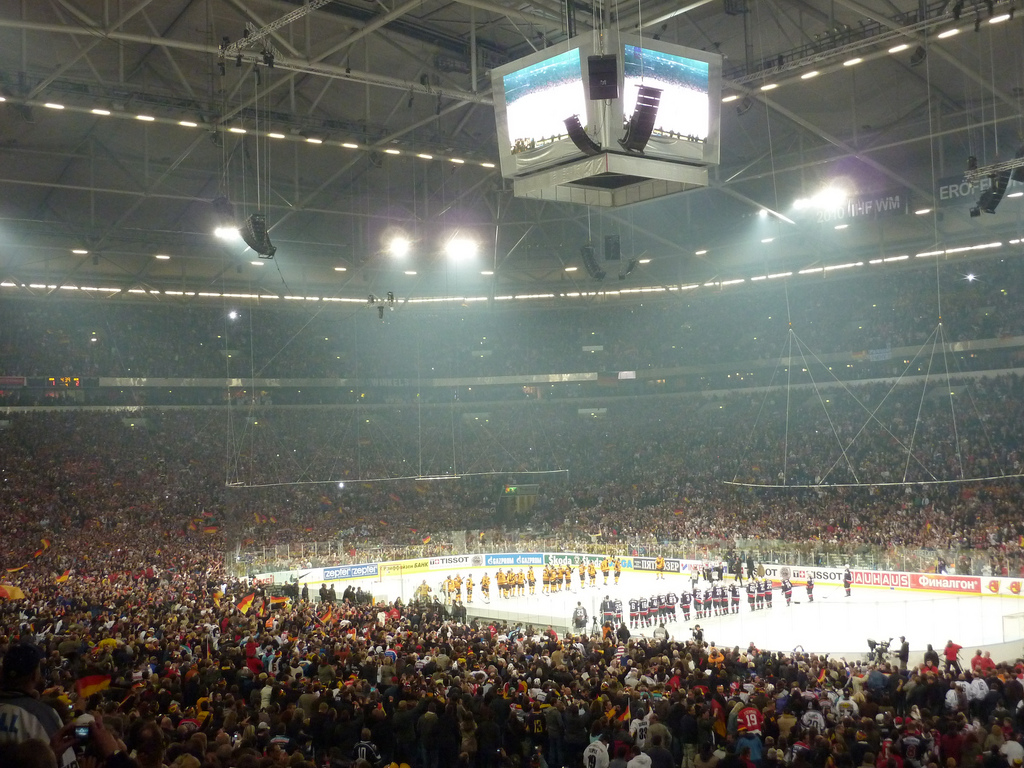
2010 IIHF World Championship Opening Game

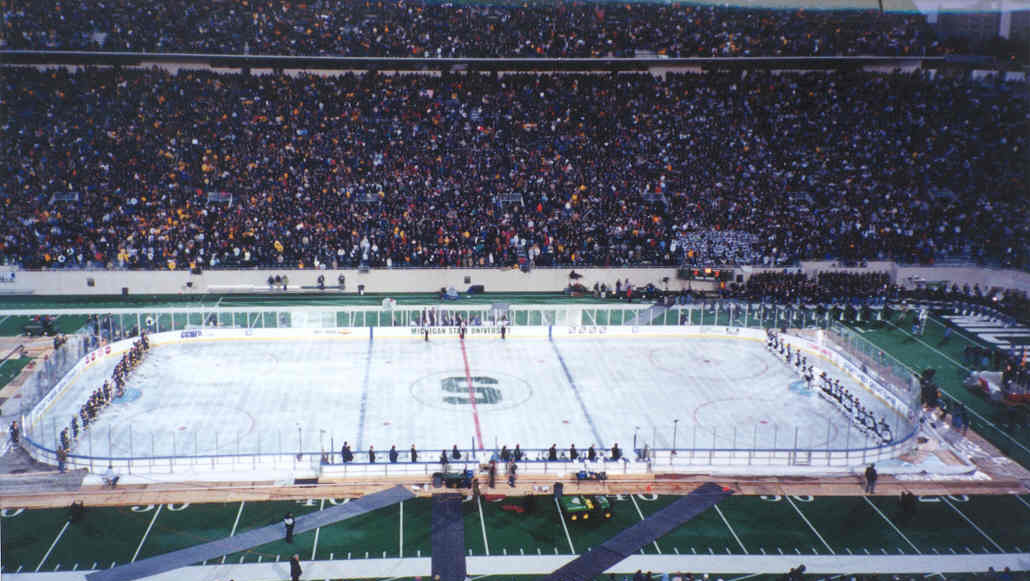
The Cold War, held November 6, 2001 at Spartan Stadium, had the highest ever attendance of an ice hockey game at that time.

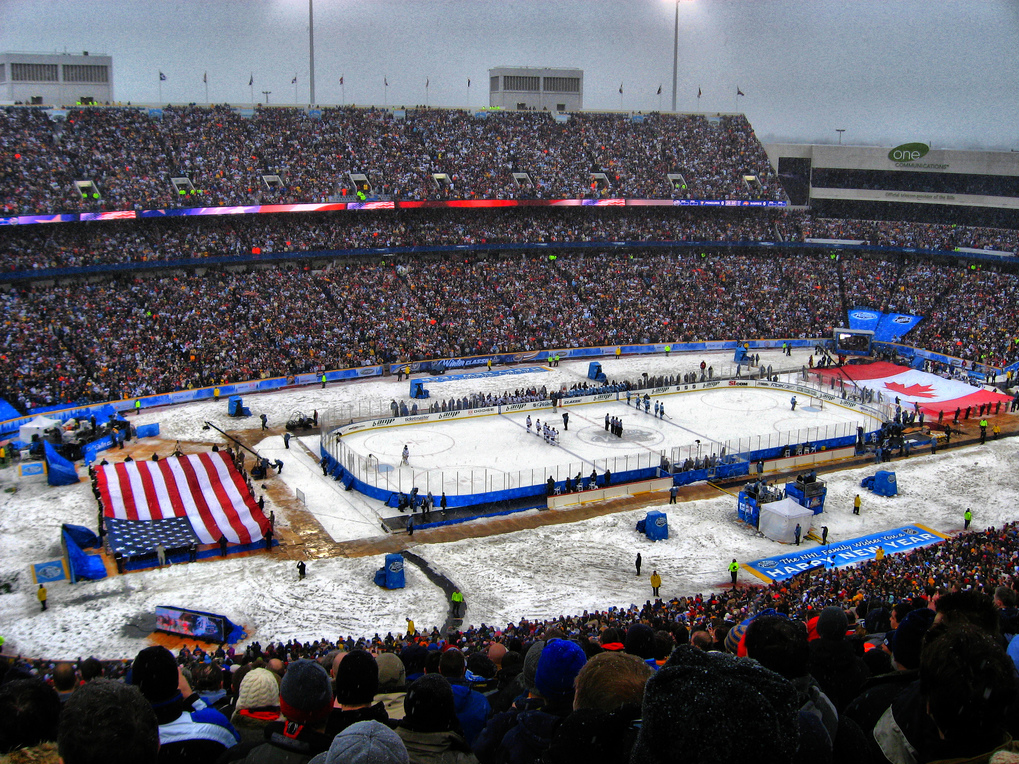
The 2008 NHL Winter Classic has the fourth-highest ever attendance of an ice hockey game, and the second highest for a game in a professional league.

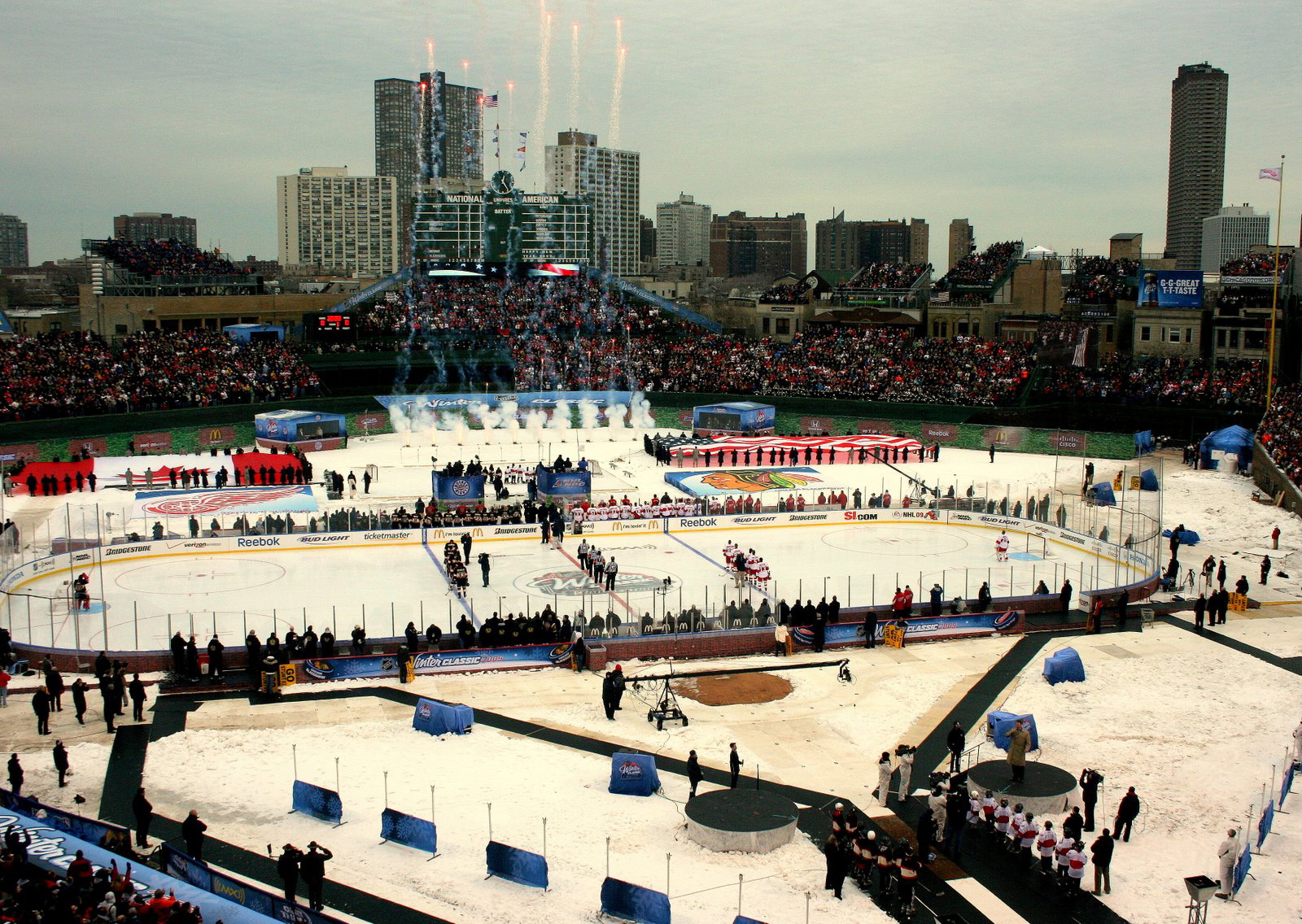
The 2009 NHL Winter Classic, held at Wrigley Field.

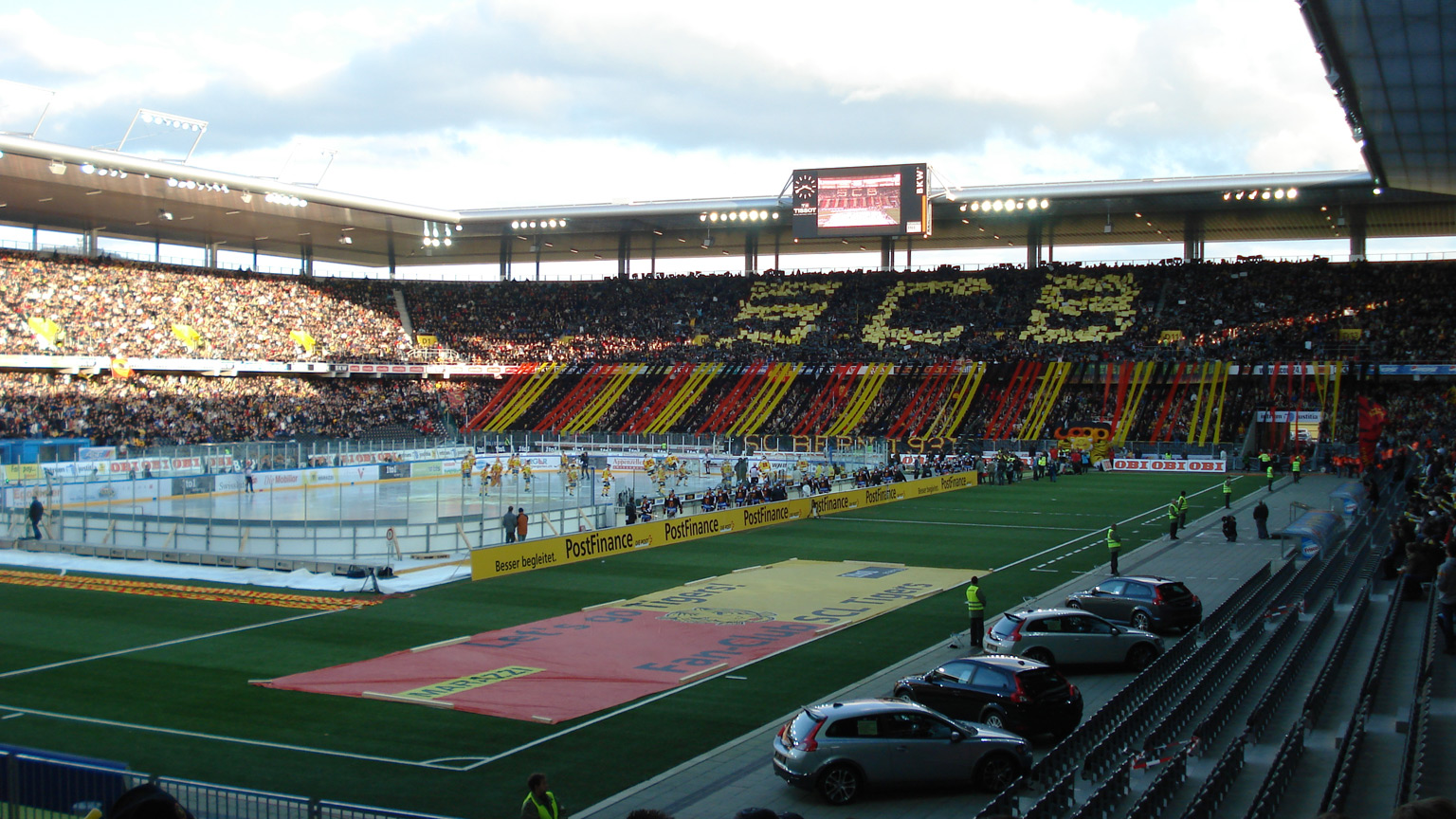
SCL Tigers versus SC Bern during the 100th match of the Tigers-Bern derby.

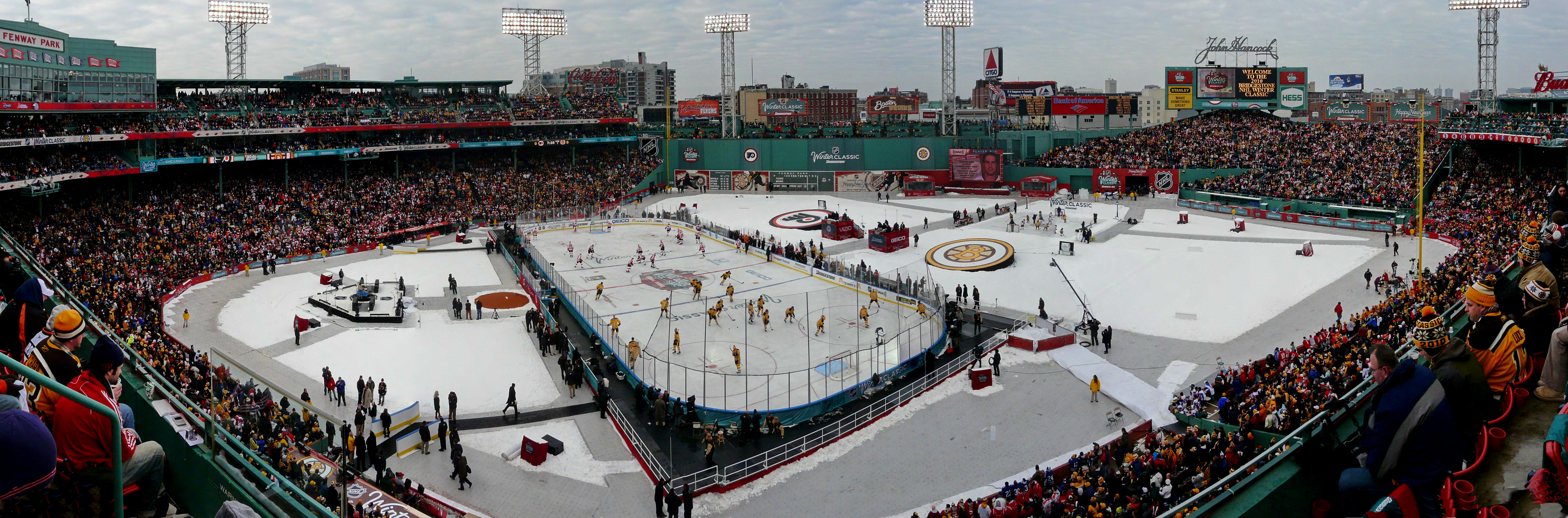
The 2010 NHL Winter Classic, held at Fenway Park.

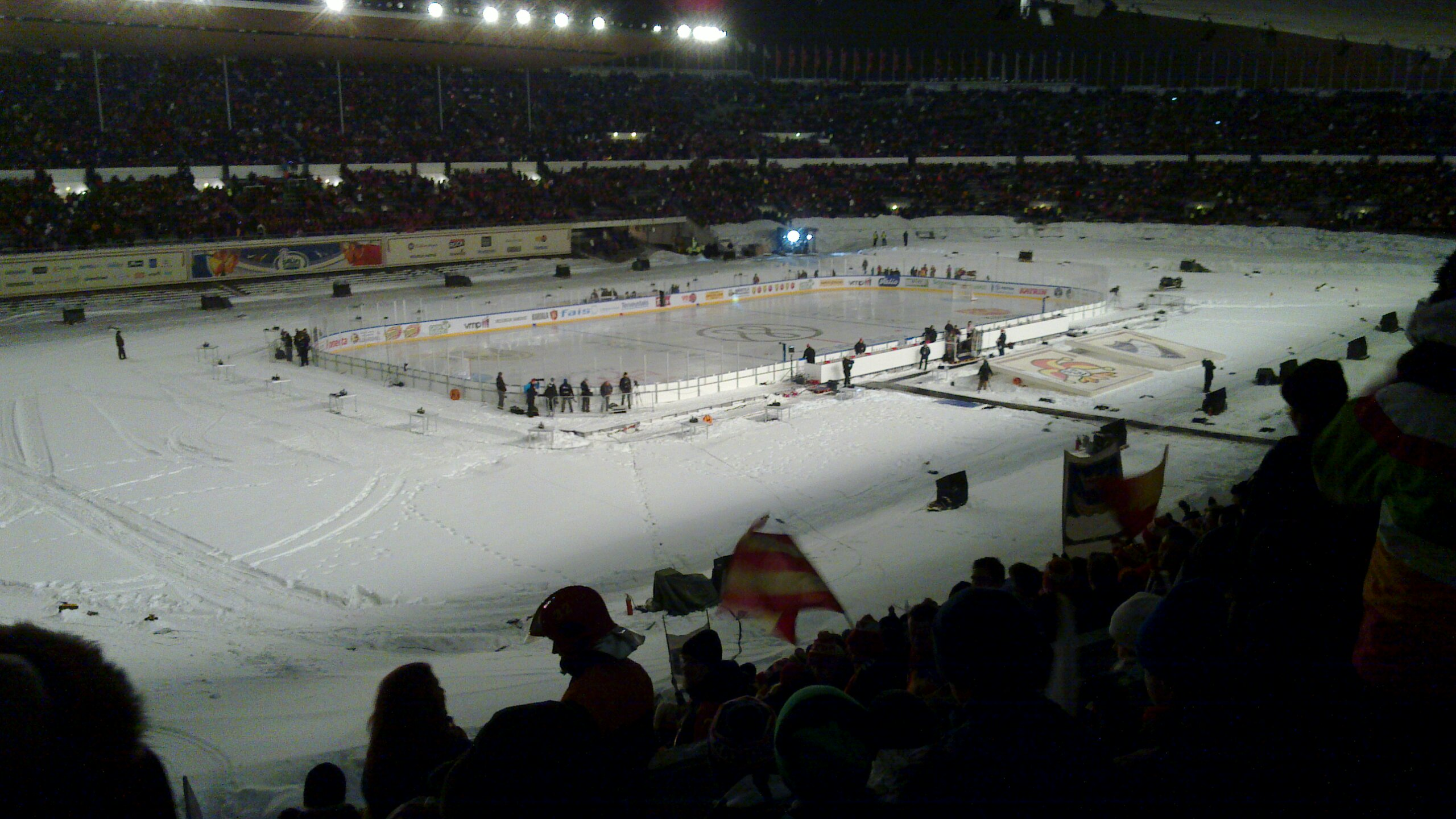
Talviklassikko 2011, Helsinki, Finland
