= Michigan Stadium =

Home stadium of the Michigan Wolverines. Ann Arbor, Michigan

- The Big House
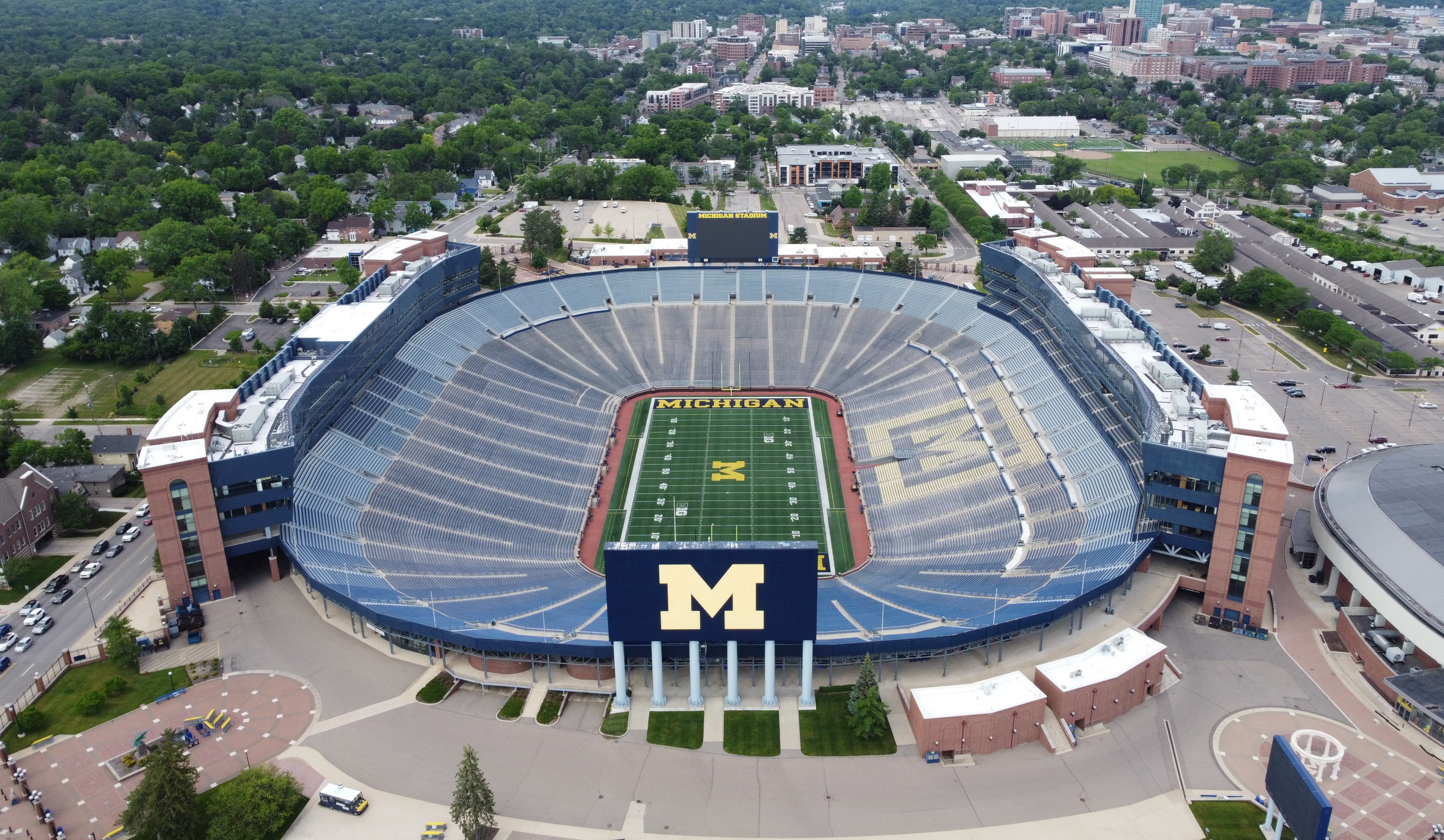
- Michigan Stadium in 2021
- Interactive map of Michigan Stadium
- Location: 1201 South Main Street; Ann Arbor, Michigan 48104-3722
- Coordinates: 42°15′57.2″N 83°44′55.5″W
- Owner: University of Michigan
- Operator: University of Michigan
- Capacity: 107,600 (2015–present) Formerly List: 72,000 (1927); 85,752 (1928–1948); 97,239 (1949–1955); 101,001 (1956–1972); 101,701 (1973–1991); 102,501 (1992–1997); 107,501 (1998–2007); 106,201 (2008–2009); 109,901 (2010–2015); 107,601 (2015–present)
- Surface: FieldTurf (2003–present); Natural grass (1991–2002); Artificial turf (1969–1990); Natural grass (1927–1968)
- Record attendance: 115,109 (Michigan vs. Notre Dame, September 7, 2013)

Construction
- Groundbreaking: September 12, 1926
- Opened: October 1, 1927 (99 years ago)
- Renovated: 2010
- Expanded: 1928, 1949, 1956, 1973, 1992, 1998, 2010
- Cost: $950,000 ($14.1 million in 2025) $226 million (2010 stadium renovation, equivalent to $338 million in 2025)
- Architects: Bernard L. Green; HNTB (2010 expansion)
- General contractor: Mortenson Construction

Tenants
- Michigan Wolverines football (1927–present); Michigan Wolverines field hockey (1973–1975); Michigan Wolverines men's lacrosse (2012–2017); Michigan Wolverines women's lacrosse (2014–2017)

Website
- mgoblue.com/stadium

Michigan Stadium, nicknamed "The Big House," is the American football stadium for the University of Michigan in Ann Arbor, Michigan. It is the largest stadium in the United States and the Western Hemisphere, the third-largest stadium in the world, and the 34th-largest sports venue in the world. Its official capacity is 107,601, but it has hosted crowds in excess of 115,000.

Michigan Stadium was designed with footings to allow the stadium's capacity to be expanded beyond 100,000. Fielding Yost envisioned a day where 150,000 seats would be needed. To keep construction costs low at the time, the decision was made to build a smaller stadium than Yost envisioned but to include the footings for future expansion.

Michigan Stadium is used for the University of Michigan's main graduation ceremonies; President Lyndon B. Johnson outlined his Great Society program at the 1964 commencement ceremonies in the stadium. It has also hosted ice hockey games including the 2014 NHL Winter Classic, a regular season NHL game between the Toronto Maple Leafs and the Detroit Red Wings with an official attendance of 105,491, a record for an ice hockey game. Additionally, a 2014 International Champions Cup soccer match between Real Madrid and Manchester United had an attendance of 109,318, a record for a soccer match in the United States.

== History ==
=== Construction and early years ===
Michigan Stadium was built in 1927 at a cost of $950,000 (equivalent to $14.1 million in 2025) and had an original capacity of 72,000. Prior to the stadium's construction, the Wolverines played football at Ferry Field. Every home game since November 8, 1975 has drawn a crowd in excess of 100,000, an active streak of more than 300 contests. On September 7, 2013, the game between Michigan and the Notre Dame Fighting Irish attracted a crowd of 115,109, a record attendance for a college football game since 1948, and an NCAA single-game attendance record at the time, overtaking the previous record of 114,804 set two years previously for the same matchup.

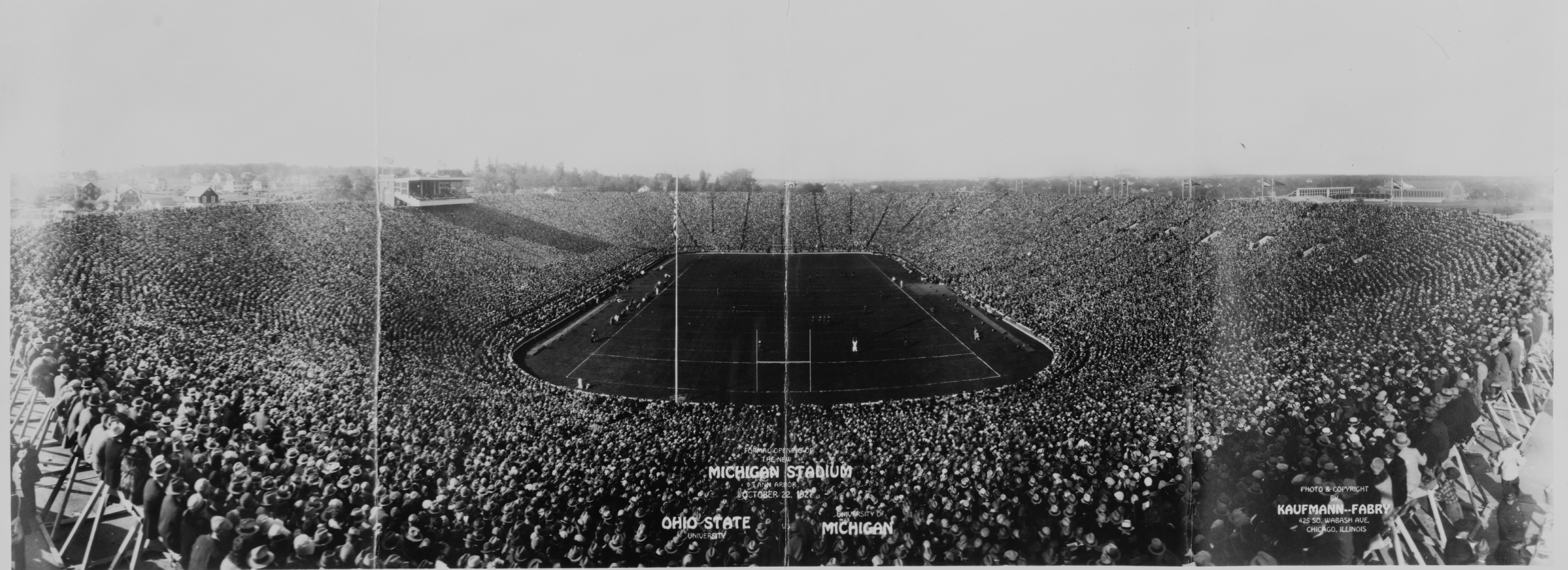
The dedication of Michigan Stadium on October 22, 1927, prior to Michigan's game against Ohio State

Prior to playing at Michigan Stadium, Michigan played its games at Ferry Field, which at its peak could seat 40,000 people. Fielding Yost recognized the need for a larger stadium after original expansions to Ferry Field proved to be too small, and persuaded the regents to build a permanent stadium in 1926. Fashioned after the Yale Bowl, the original stadium was built with a capacity of 72,000, though Yost originally wanted to have a capacity of 140,000. At Yost's urging, temporary bleachers were added at the top of the stadium, increasing capacity to 82,000.

On October 1, 1927, Michigan played Ohio Wesleyan in the first game at Michigan Stadium, prevailing easily, 33–0. The new stadium was then formally dedicated three weeks later in a contest against Ohio State on October 22. Michigan had spoiled the formal dedication of Ohio Stadium in Columbus five years earlier and was victorious again, besting the Buckeyes 21–0 before a standing-room-only crowd of 84,401. In 1930, electronic scoreboards were installed, making the stadium the first in the United States to use them to keep the official game time.

=== Post-WWII ===
In 1956, the addition of a press box raised the stadium's official capacity to 101,001. The one "extra seat" in Michigan Stadium is said to be reserved for Fritz Crisler, athletic director at the time. Since then, all official Michigan Stadium capacity figures have ended in "-01", although the extra seat's location is not specified.

Before 1968, Michigan Stadium maintained a policy of "No women or children allowed on the field". Sara Krulwich, now a photojournalist for The New York Times, was the first woman on the field. Longtime radio announcer Bob Ufer dubbed Michigan Stadium "The hole that Yost dug, Crisler paid for, Canham carpeted, and Schembechler fills every cotton-pickin' Saturday afternoon". Since November 8, 1975, the stadium has held over 100,000 fans for every home game (the Indiana University contest on October 25, 1975 attracted "only" 93,857 fans).—and 24 of the 25 most attended NCAA games are at the stadium. Michigan Stadium's size is not wholly apparent from the outside as most of the seats are below ground level.

By the mid-1980s, Michigan Stadium had become known by the nickname "The Big House", with Keith Jackson credited for popularizing the nickname.

=== 21st century ===
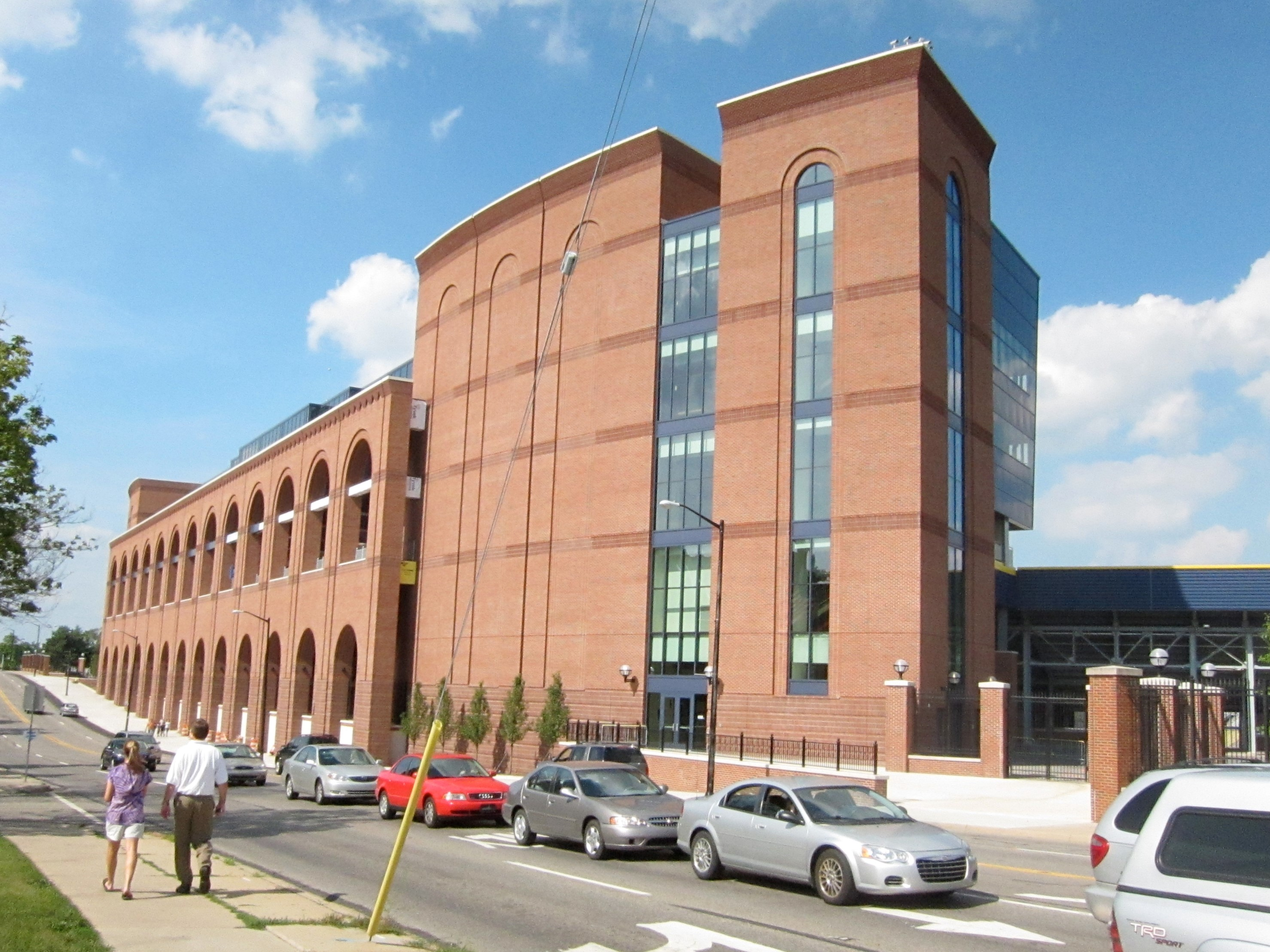
The west side structure at Michigan Stadium

Michigan's game versus Ball State University on November 4, 2006, was the 200th consecutive crowd of over 100,000 fans. When the game's attendance is announced, the public address announcer, historically Howard King, thanks the fans for "being part of the largest crowd watching a football game anywhere in America today".

On September 9, 2006, attendees of Michigan's football game against the Central Michigan Chippewas endured the first weather delay in the stadium's history after lightning struck nearby during the first quarter and play was suspended for approximately one hour.

On September 3, 2011, Michigan and Western Michigan mutually agreed to end their game with 1:27 left in the third quarter because of an ongoing lightning delay. It was the first time Michigan had a football game called because of lightning. The stadium was evacuated at 6:38 p.m. and the game was called shortly after 7:00.

On June 21, 2007, the University's Board of Regents approved a $226 million renovation (equivalent to $338 million in 2025) and expansion project for Michigan Stadium. The project included replacement of some bleachers, widening of aisles and individual seats, installing hand rails, and the addition of a new press box, 83 luxury boxes, and 3,200 club seats. The renovation plan garnered opposition from a small number of students, alumni, and fans around the country, which waned as the renovation neared external completion.

A disabled-veterans group filed a federal lawsuit against the university on April 17, 2007, alleging that the design of the project did not meet federal standards for wheelchair-accessible seating.

On March 11, 2008, as part of the settlement terms of a lawsuit filed against the university pursuant to the Americans with Disabilities Act, the university announced that the official capacity of the stadium would be reduced to accommodate additional wheelchair-accessible seating beginning with the 2009 season. The project was completed before the 2010 season.

Renovations in April 2008 caused that year's University of Michigan graduation ceremony to be moved to the Diag.

In August 2011, the University completed a six-month scoreboard replacement project; the new boards measured 4,000 sq ft (370 m^{2}) each with a resolution of 900 x 1632 pixels.

Michigan Stadium was rededicated on September 4, 2010, before Michigan's first home football game of the 2010 season against the University of Connecticut, with a listed capacity of 109,901.

After the renovation, the stadium lacked permanent lights, although platforms for temporary lights were included in the design. In September 2010, a few days after the rededication, the University of Michigan's Board of Regents approved a plan to add permanent lights, at a cost of $1.8 million (equivalent to $2.59 million in 2025). The lights were first used at the men's hockey game on December 11, 2010. The following season saw the stadium's first night football game on September 10, 2011. The Wolverines defeated the Notre Dame Fighting Irish 35–31.

The Michigan lacrosse program was elevated to NCAA varsity status in spring 2011, effective in the 2011–12 academic year. The team played most of its 2012 games in Michigan Stadium, including a match against Ohio State on April 14, 2012, after the annual Wolverine football spring game.

Before the 2023 season, new video boards were installed in the north and south end zones. The identically-sized screens each measure 152 by 55 feet (46 by 17 m) or 8,360 square feet (777 m^{2}), are the fourth-largest in college football behind the video boards at Jordan-Hare Stadium and Ross–Ade Stadium, and are among the largest in the world. The new video boards were part of a $41 million Michigan athletic department renovation that also upgraded the production room and audio system, and introduced a new LED stadium lighting system.

The renovations also included replacing the video boards at Alumni Field at Carol Hutchins Stadium, home of Michigan softball; Cliff Keen Arena, home of Michigan men's gymnastics, women's volleyball, and wrestling; Phyllis Ocker Field, home of Michigan field hockey; Ray Fisher Stadium, home of Michigan baseball; and U-M Soccer Stadium, home of Michigan men's soccer and women's soccer.

== Seating and surface ==
The stadium's original capacity was 72,000, but Fielding Yost made certain to install footings that could allow for expansion over 100,000 seats. Initially, all seating consisted of wooden bleachers. These were replaced with permanent metal seating in 1949 by Fritz Crisler, athletic director at the time. From 1927 to 1968, the stadium's field was natural grass. This was replaced with 3M TartanTurf in 1969 to give players better traction. However, this surface was thought to be unforgiving on players' joints, and the stadium returned to natural grass in 1991. This too became problematic, as the field's below-surface location near the water table made it difficult for grass to permanently take root. The field was converted to FieldTurf, an artificial surface designed to give grass-like playing characteristics, in 2003. In 2010, it was upgraded with a newer version of FieldTurf called Duraspine.

== Attendance records ==
Michigan Stadium holds the NCAA single-season average home attendance record, set in 2012 at 112,252 fans per game. In 2023, Michigan Stadium had the highest average attendance per game (109,971) and highest total attendance (769,797).

On September 7, 2013, Michigan Stadium drew a crowd of 115,109 to see Michigan defeat Notre Dame 41–30, which at the time represented a post-1948 NCAA collegiate football attendance record. Previously, and prior to NCAA record keeping for attendance, a 1927 Notre Dame–USC game at Soldier Field in Chicago drew an estimated 117,000–123,000. Both of these records fell in 2016 when Tennessee and Virginia Tech drew 156,990 for a game held at Bristol Motor Speedway, a NASCAR track with a capacity of over 150,000.

"The Big House" also holds the record for the largest attendance for an NCAA Division II football game, one involving Slippery Rock University of Pennsylvania. Back in 1959, stadium announcer Steve Filipiak thought it would be amusing to include Slippery Rock with the other football scores he read to the crowd, due to the school's unusual name. Soon, it was a tradition, and Slippery Rock became so popular with U of M fans that on September 29, 1979, "The Rock" played in-state rival Shippensburg at Michigan Stadium, in front of 61,143 fans (Shippensburg won, 45-14). Slippery Rock made repeat trips to Ann Arbor in 1981 and 2014.

With an attendance of 104,173, "The Big Chill at the Big House" set the record attendance for a hockey game. The record was broken on January 1, 2014 for the NHL's 2014 Winter Classic, where a crowd of 105,491 saw the host Detroit Red Wings fall to the Toronto Maple Leafs in a shootout.

On Saturday, August 2, 2014, a sell-out crowd of 109,318 watched Manchester United defeat Real Madrid 3-1 in an International Champions Cup match. The official attendance figure was the largest for a soccer game in the United States to date, overtaking the previous record set by the 1984 Olympics Gold Medal match, when 101,799 saw France defeat Brazil 2-0 at the Rose Bowl in Pasadena, California. Michigan Stadium also holds three of the top four U.S. Soccer attendances as a crowd of 105,826 watched a 2016 International Champions Cup match on July 30, 2016 where Real Madrid defeated Chelsea 3-2 and a crowd of 101,254 watched a 2018 International Champions Cup match on July 28, 2018 where Liverpool defeated Manchester United 4-1.

On February 12, 2025, the University of Michigan Athletic Department and multi-Platinum, GRAMMY-winning artist Zach Bryan jointly announced a first-of-its-kind concert at Michigan Stadium on Sept. 27, 2025, with special guest John Mayer. Ryan Bingham and The Texas Gentlemen and Joshua Slone will also be joining the bill for Michigan Stadium's inaugural dedicated concert

That concert subsequently broke the record for largest attendance ever at a U.S. ticketed concert with a single headlining act. He played to an announced crowd of 112,408, breaking the previous record set by George Strait on Saturday, June 15, 2024, with a concert at Kyle Field at Texas A&M University in College Station, Texas, with 110,905 fans in attendance. It was only the second concert in the 98-year history of the venue, but the first by a headlining act.

Highest attendance at Michigan Stadium
| Rank | Attendance | Date | Game result |
|---|---|---|---|
| 1 | 115,109 | Sept. 7, 2013 | Michigan 41, Notre Dame 30 |
| 2 | 114,804 | Sept. 10, 2011 | Michigan 35, Notre Dame 31 |
| 3 | 114,132 | Nov. 26, 2011 | Michigan 40, Ohio State 34 |
| 4 | 113,833 | Oct. 20, 2012 | Michigan 12, Michigan State 10 |
| 5 | 113,718 | Nov. 19, 2011 | Michigan 45, Nebraska 17 |
| 6 | 113,511 | Nov. 30, 2013 | Michigan 41, Ohio State 42 |
| 7 | 113,090 | Sept. 4, 2010 | Michigan 30, Connecticut 10 |
| 8 | 113,085 | Oct. 11, 2014 | Michigan 18, Penn State 13 |
| 9 | 113,065 | Oct. 9, 2010 | Michigan 17, Michigan State 34 |
| 10 | 113,016 | Nov. 17, 2012 | Michigan 42, Iowa 17 |

Evolution of the largest crowd at Michigan Stadium
| Attendance | Date | Game result |
|---|---|---|
| 115,109 | Sept. 7, 2013 | Michigan 41, Notre Dame 30 |
| 114,804 | Sept. 10, 2011 | Michigan 35, Notre Dame 31 |
| 113,090 | Sept. 4, 2010 | Michigan 30, Connecticut 10 |
| 112,118 | Nov. 22, 2003 | Michigan 35, Ohio State 21 |
| 111,726 | Sept. 13, 2003 | Michigan 38, Notre Dame 0 |
| 111,575 | Nov. 20, 1999 | Michigan 24, Ohio State 17 |
| 111,523 | Sept. 4, 1999 | Michigan 26, Notre Dame 22 |
| 111,238 | Sept. 26, 1998 | Michigan 29, Michigan State 17 |
| 111,012 | Sept. 12, 1998 | Michigan 28, Syracuse 38 |
| 106,982 | Nov. 22, 1997 | Michigan 20, Ohio State 14 |
| 106,867 | Nov. 20, 1993 | Michigan 28, Ohio State 0 |
| 106,851 | Sept. 11, 1993 | Michigan 23, Notre Dame 27 |
| 106,788 | Oct. 10, 1992 | Michigan 35, Michigan State 10 |
| 106,255 | Nov. 17, 1979 | Michigan 15, Ohio State 18 |
| 106,024 | Nov. 19, 1977 | Michigan 14, Ohio State 6 |
| 105,543 | Nov. 22, 1975 | Michigan 14, Ohio State 21 |
| 105,223 | Nov. 24, 1973 | Michigan 10, Ohio State 10 (tie) |
| 104,016 | Nov. 20, 1971 | Michigan 10, Ohio State 7 |
| 103,588 | Nov. 22, 1969 | Michigan 24, Ohio State 12 |
| 103,234 | Oct. 3, 1959 | Michigan 8, Michigan State 34 |
| 101,001 | Oct. 6, 1956 | Michigan 0, Michigan State 9 |
| 97,369 | Nov. 19, 1955 | Michigan 0, Ohio State 17 |
| 97,366 | Oct. 8, 1955 | Michigan 26, Army 2 |
| 97,239 | Sept. 24, 1949 | Michigan 7, Michigan State 3 |
| 86,408 | Oct. 9, 1943 | Michigan 13, Notre Dame 35 |
| 85,088 | Oct. 19, 1928 | Michigan 0, Ohio State 7 |
| 84,401 | Oct. 22, 1927 | Michigan 21, Ohio State 0 |
| 27,864 | Oct. 8, 1927 | Michigan 21, Michigan State 0 |
| 17,483 | Oct. 1, 1927 | Michigan 33, Ohio Wesleyan 0 |

== Other events ==
=== Ice hockey ===
| Date | Away team | Score | Home team | Attendance |
|---|---|---|---|---|
| December 4, 2010 | Concordia Falcons | 0–3 | Adrian Bulldogs | 1,470 |
| December 11, 2010 | Michigan State Spartans | 0–5 | Michigan Wolverines | 104,173 |
| January 1, 2014 | Toronto Maple Leafs | 3–2 (SO) | Detroit Red Wings | 105,491 (announced) 104,173 (certified) |

=== Association football ===
| Date | Team 1 | Score | Team 2 | Attendance |
|---|---|---|---|---|
| August 2, 2014 | (England) Manchester United | 3–1 | (Spain) Real Madrid | 109,318 |
| July 30, 2016 | (Spain) Real Madrid | 3–2 | (England) Chelsea | 105,826 |
| July 28, 2018 | (England) Manchester United | 1–4 | (England) Liverpool | 101,254 |
| August 10, 2019 | (Spain) Barcelona | 4–0 | (Italy) Napoli | 60,043 |

=== Musical acts ===
| Date | Artists | Attendance |
|---|---|---|
| September 27, 2025 | Zach Bryan, John Mayer, Ryan Bingham & The Texas Gentlemen, Joshua Slone | 112,408 |
| July 24/25, 2026 | Morgan Wallen, Thomas Rhett, HARDY, Blake Whiten, Hudson Westbrook | 24th: 98,402 25th: 93,466 |

== Gallery ==
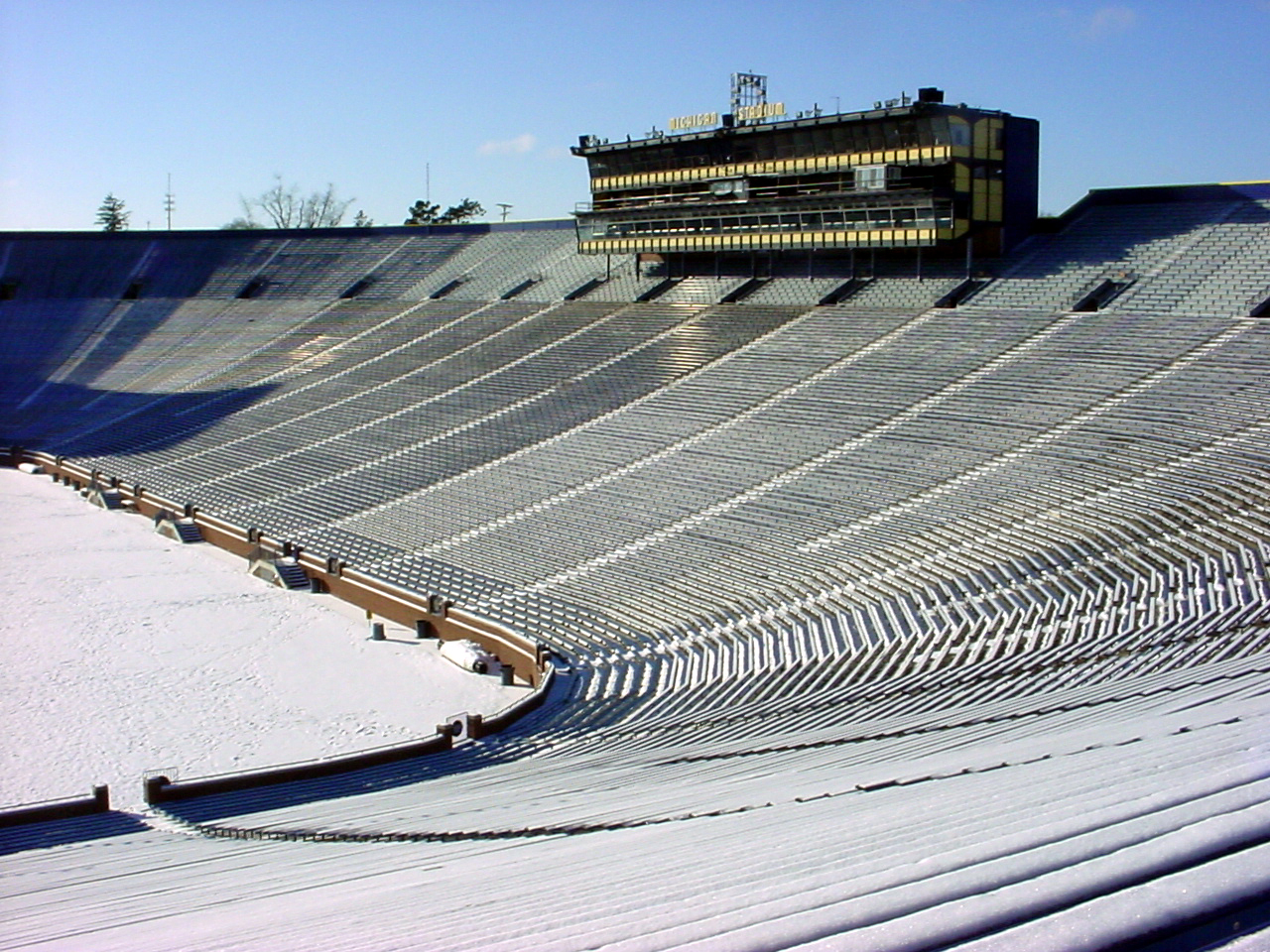
Michigan Stadium, winter 2002

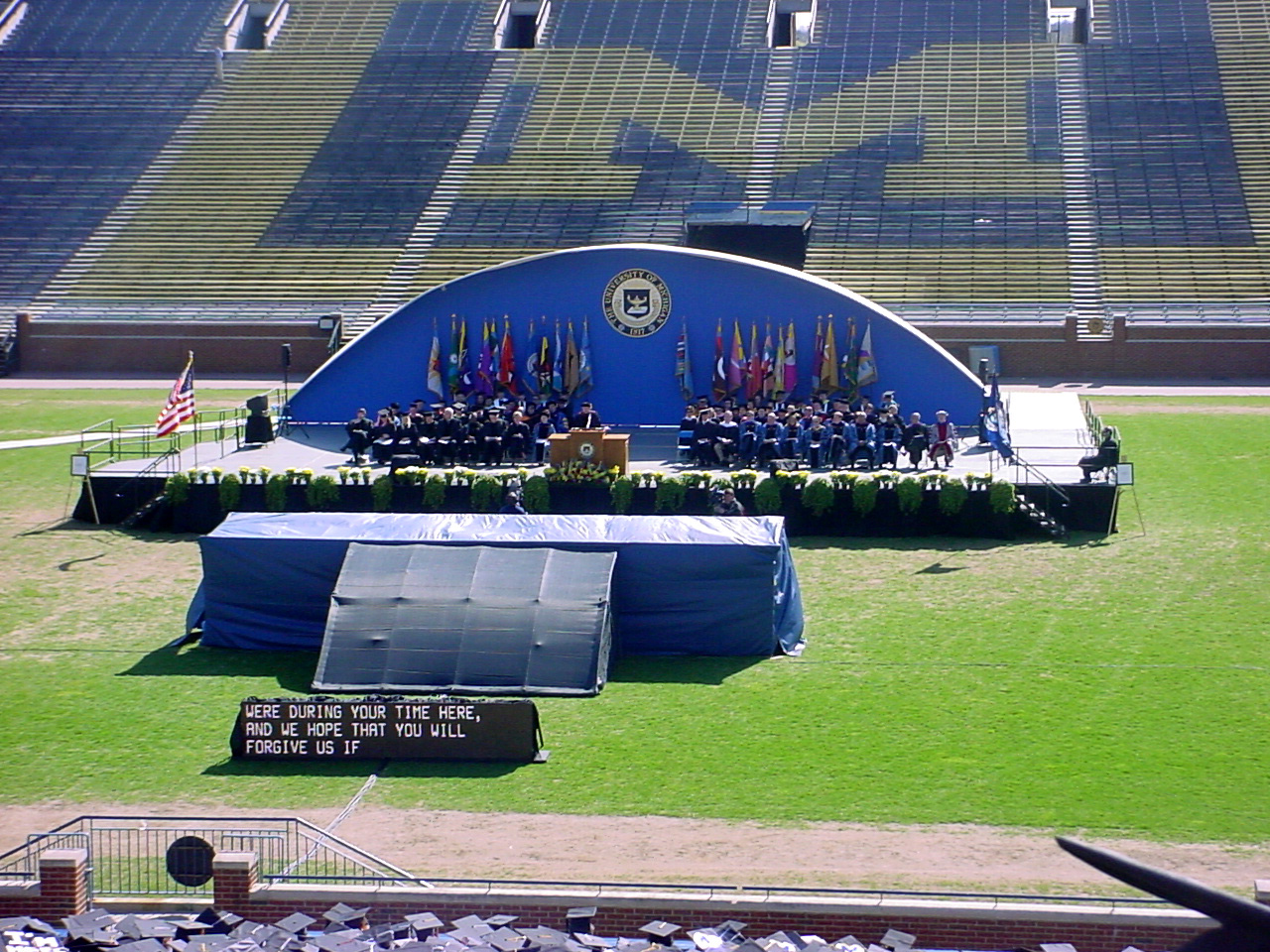
Graduation ceremony at Michigan Stadium, 2003

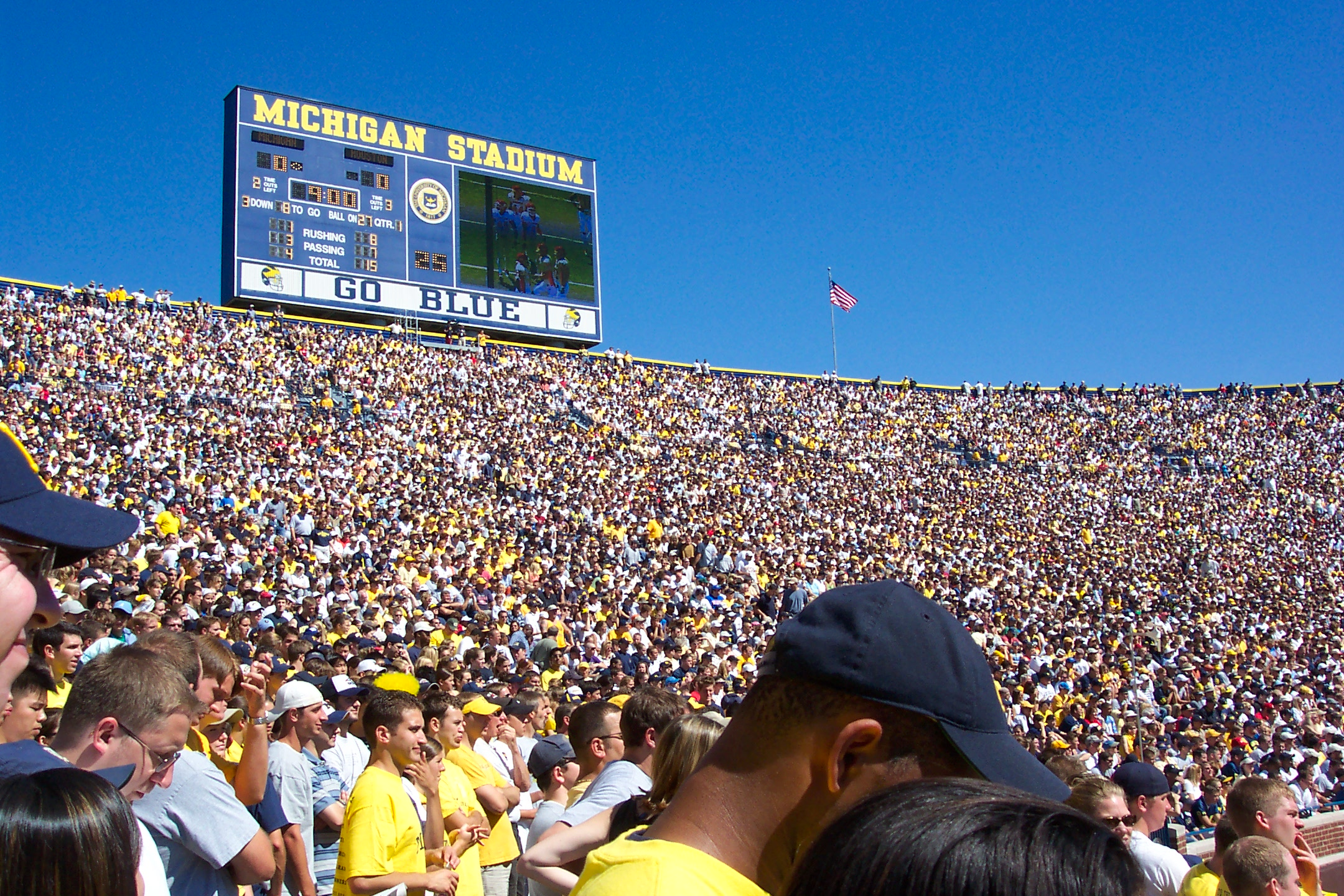
The stadium filled for an American football game, 2003

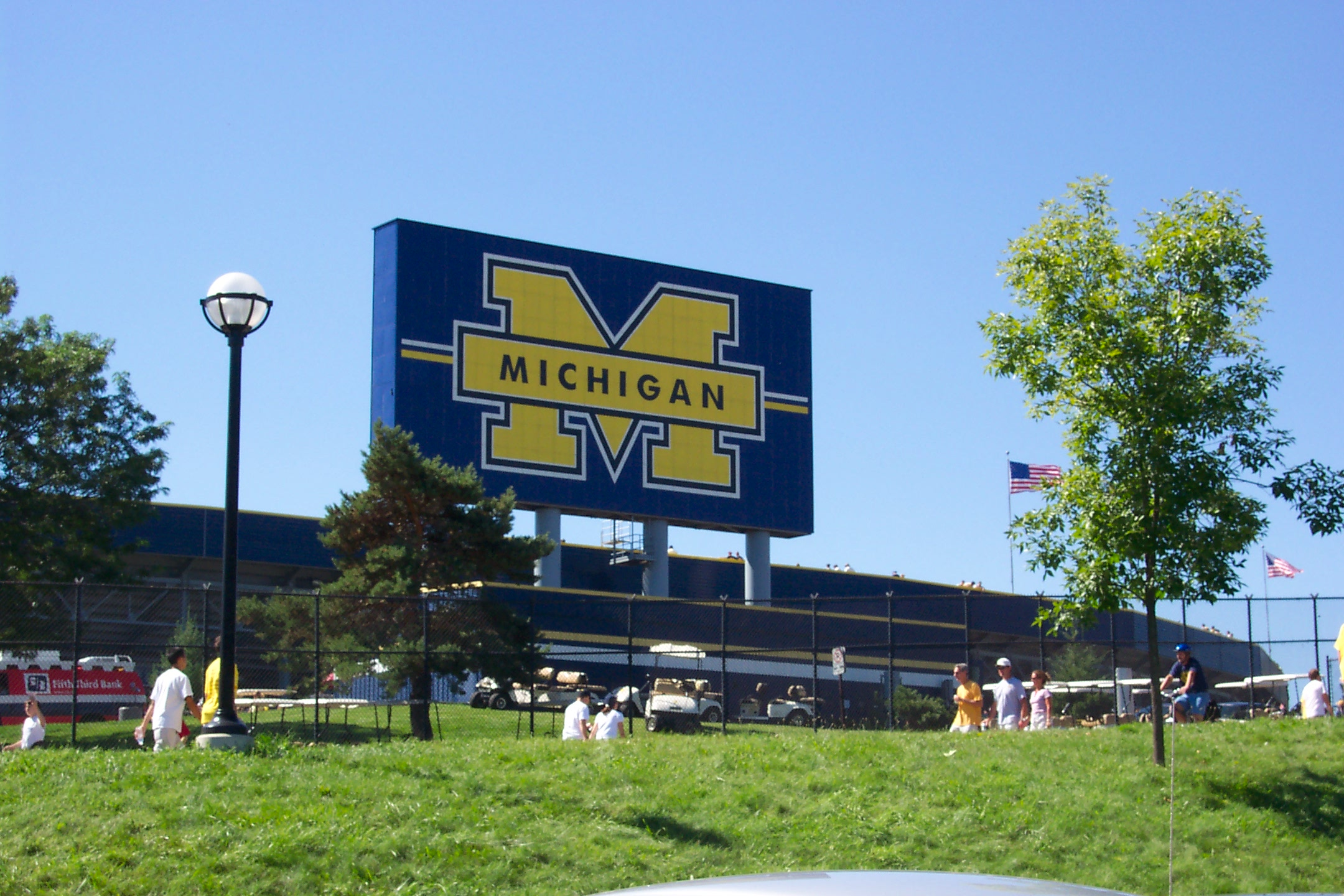
Exterior view (2002-2009)

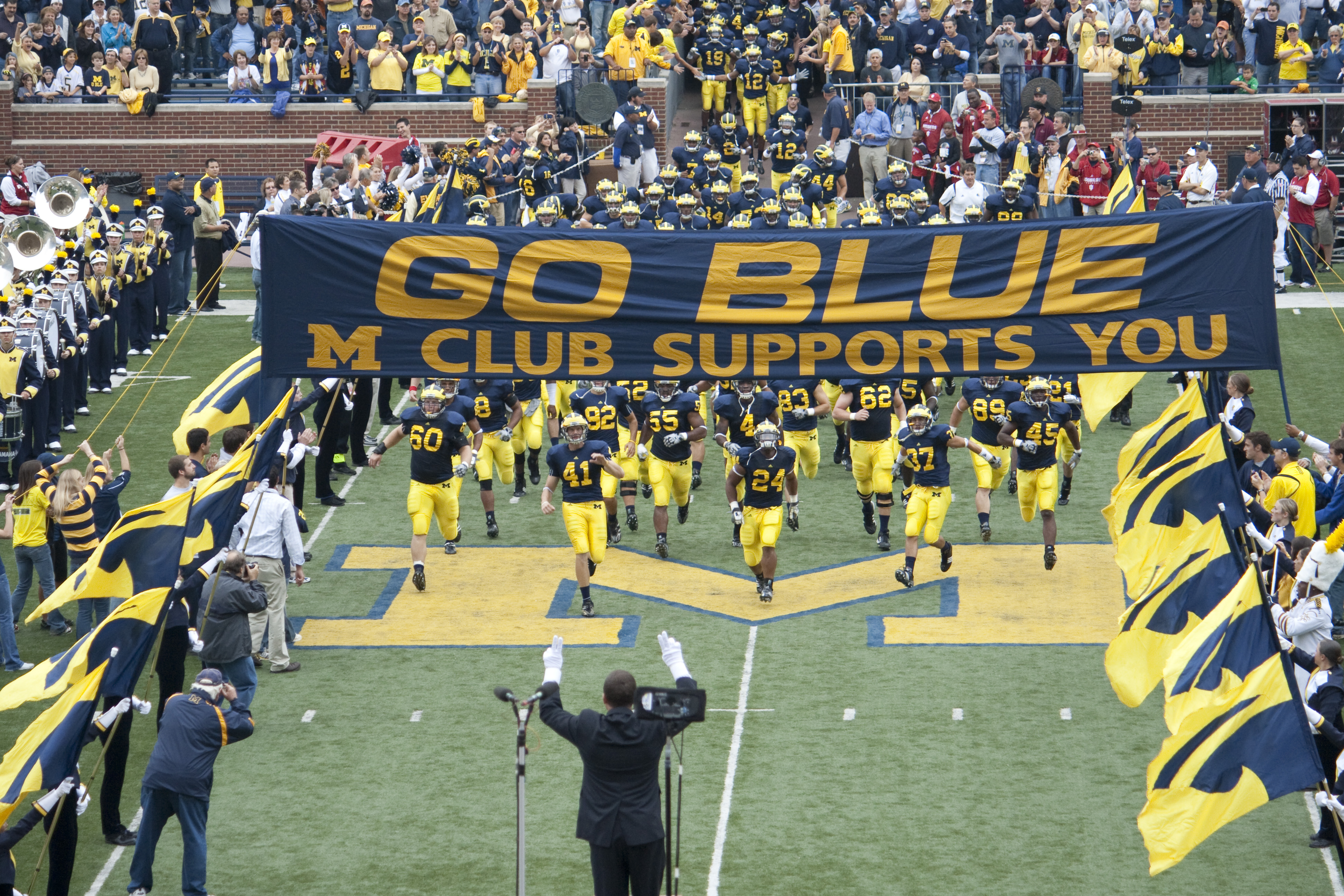
2009 team enters Stadium under the M Club banner to a Michigan Marching Band salute

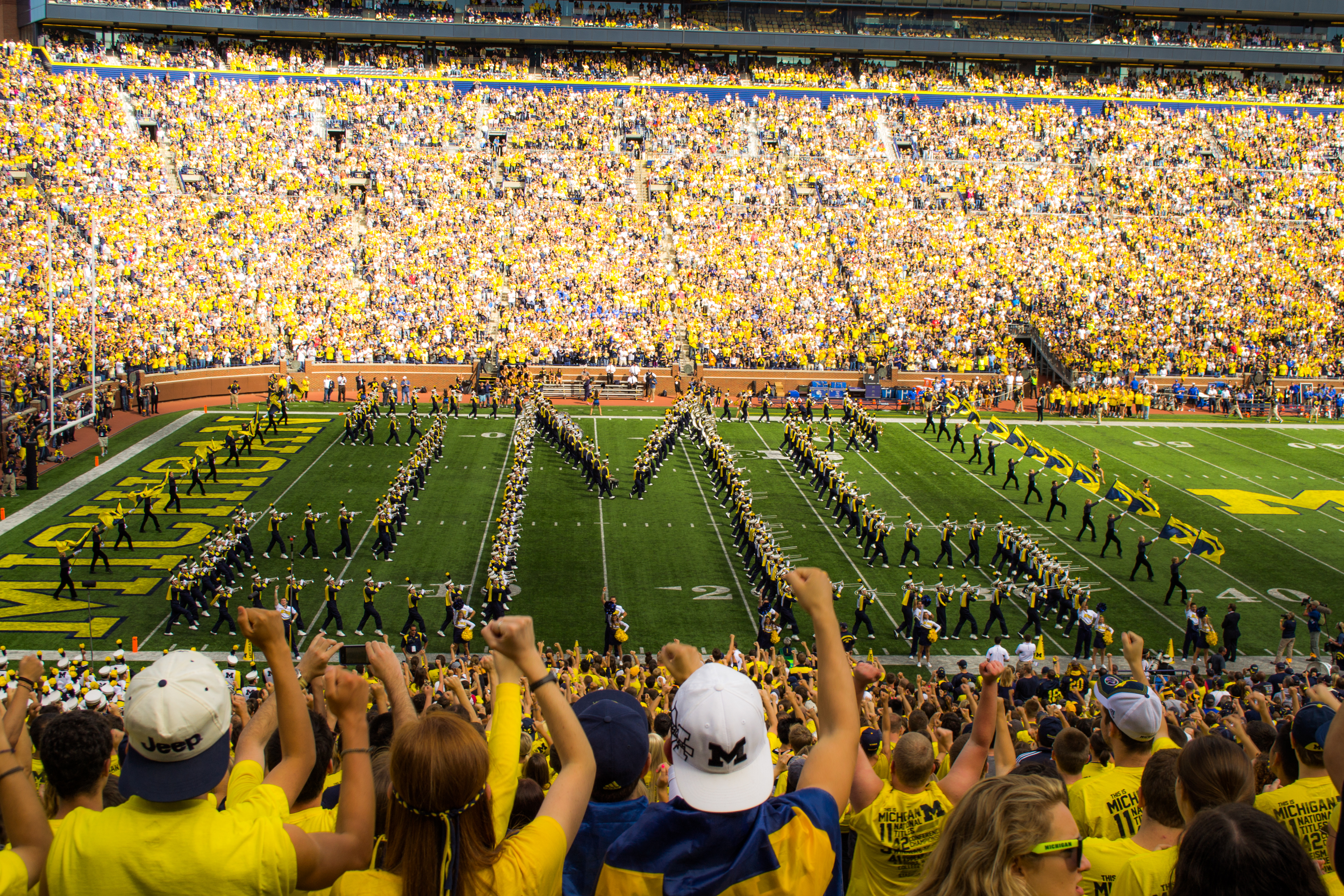
Michigan Marching Band's Block M

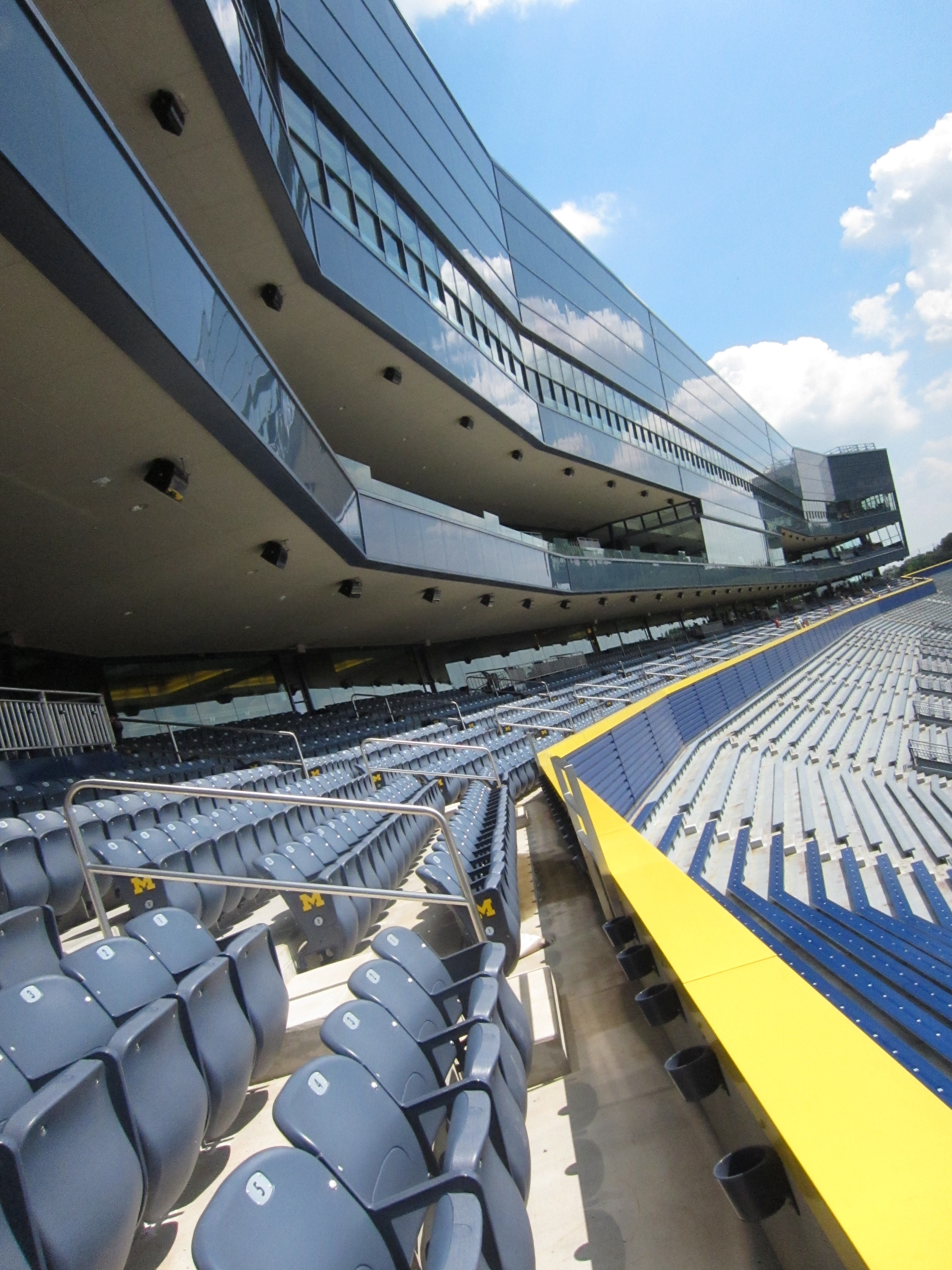
The completed east side structure, from the first floor of the new Jack Roth Stadium Club

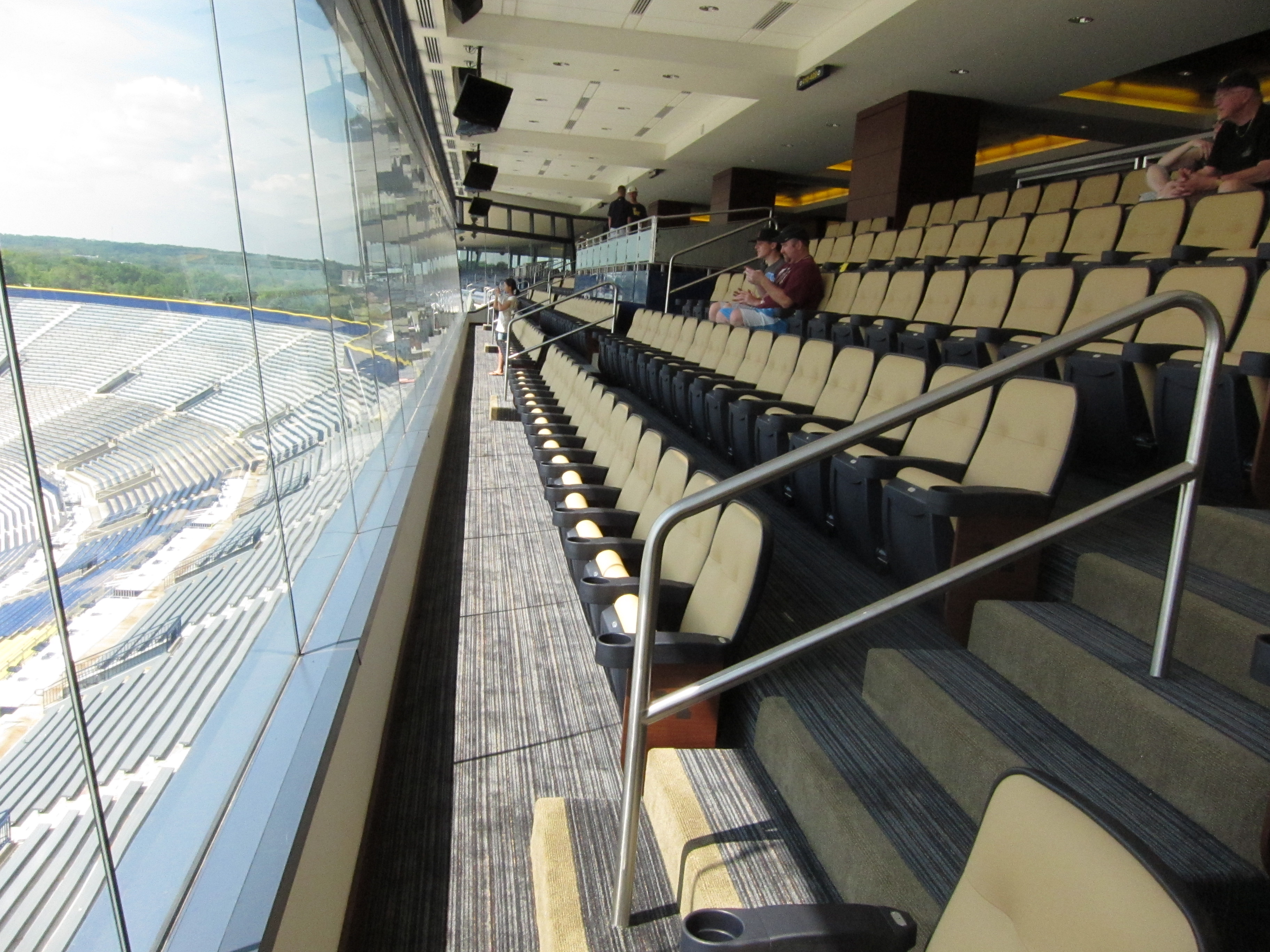
Inside the second floor of the Jack Roth Stadium Club in the new east side structure

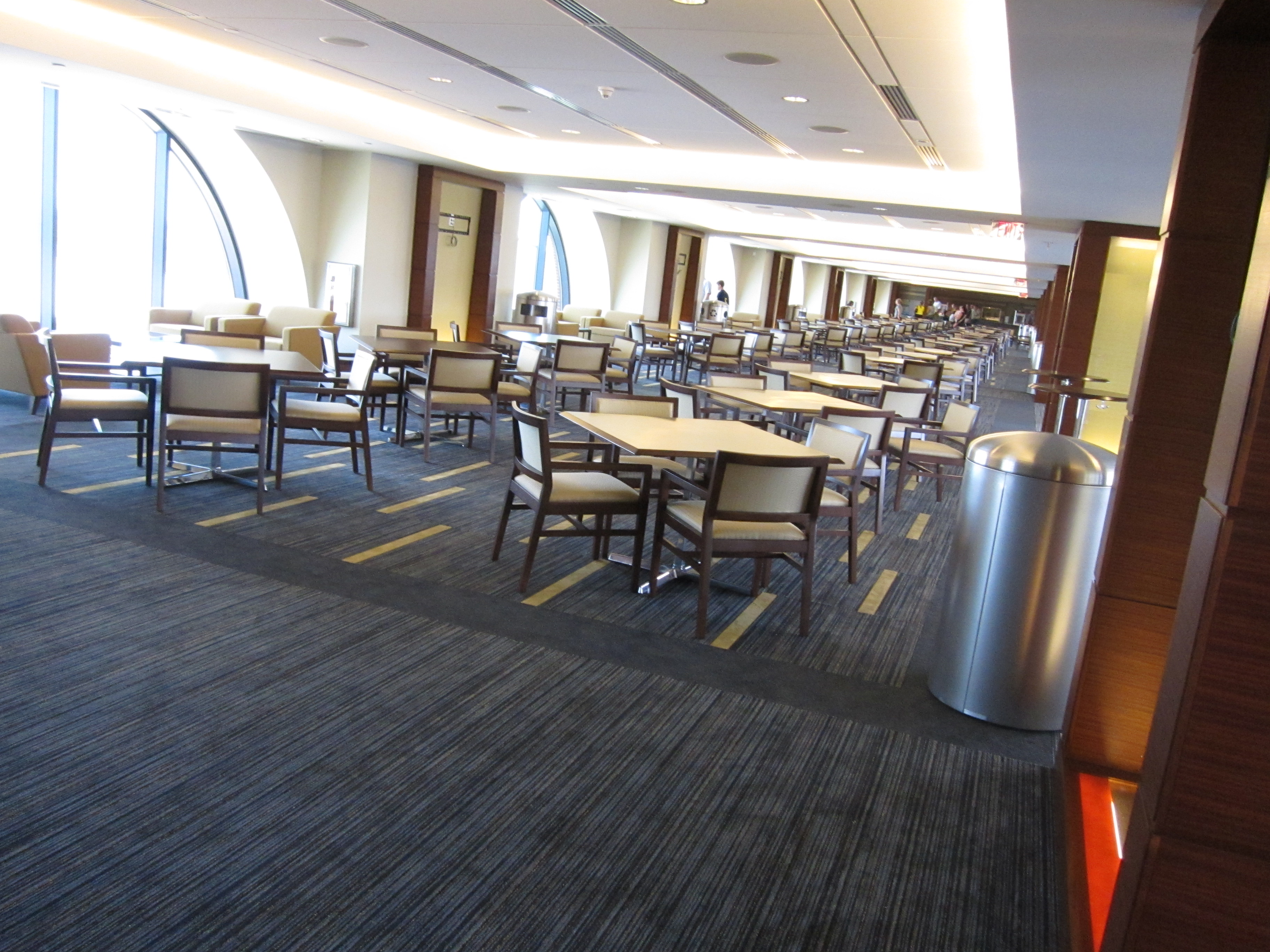
Inside the dining room on the second floor of the Jack Roth Stadium Club in the new east side structure

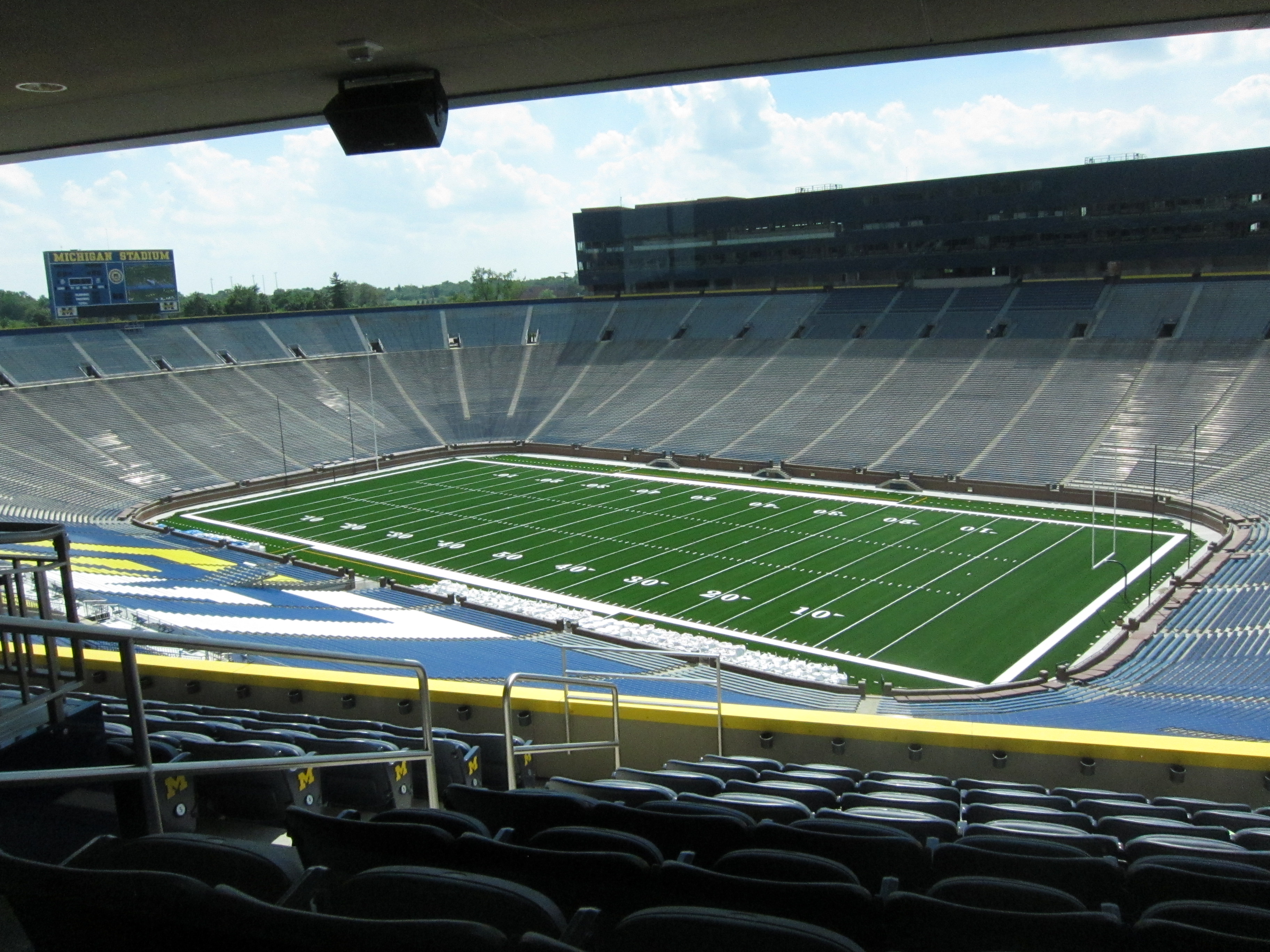
The renovated Michigan Stadium, looking west toward new premium seating and press facilities, July 14, 2010

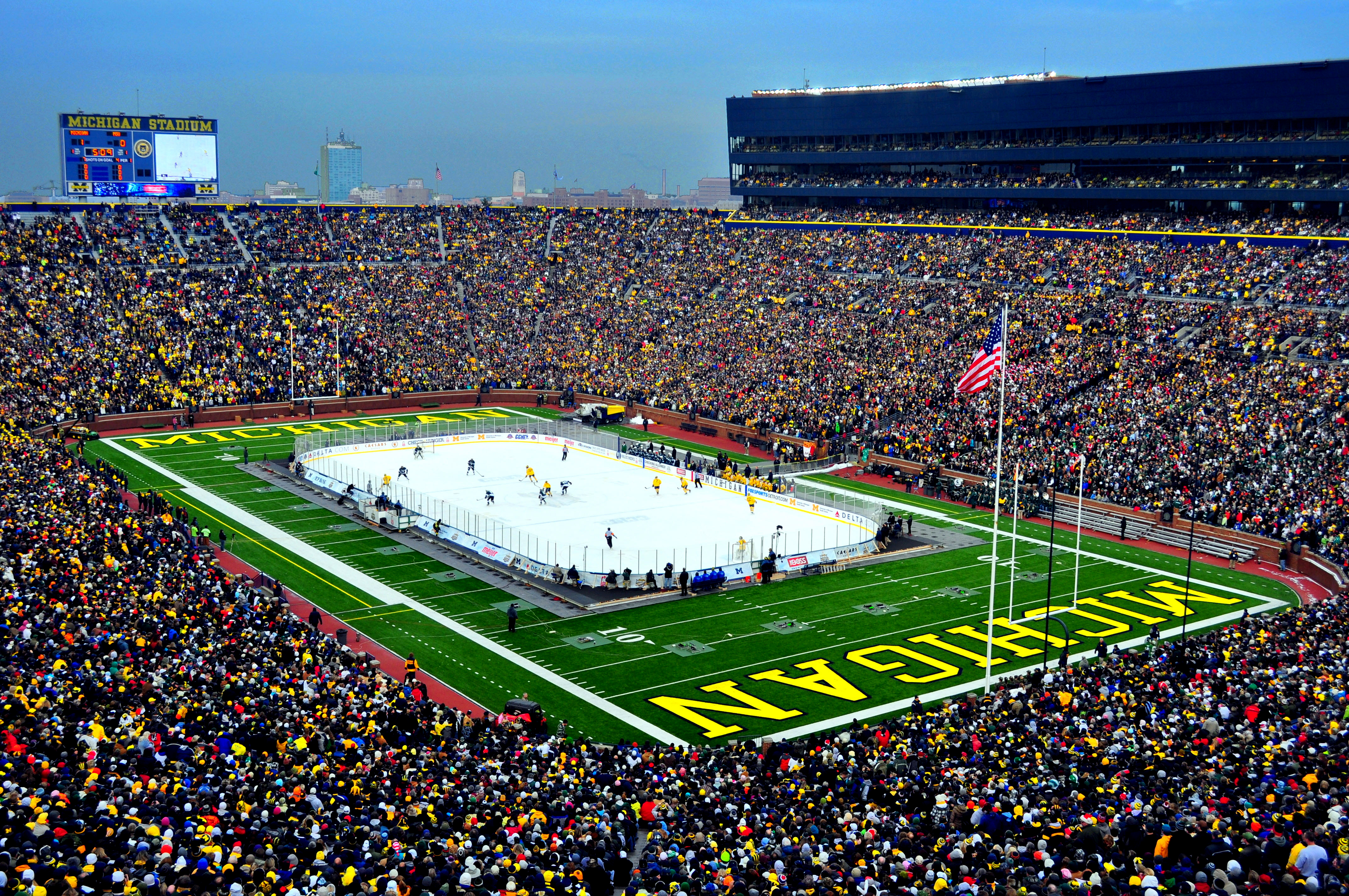
Opening face-off of The Big Chill at the Big House, December 11, 2010

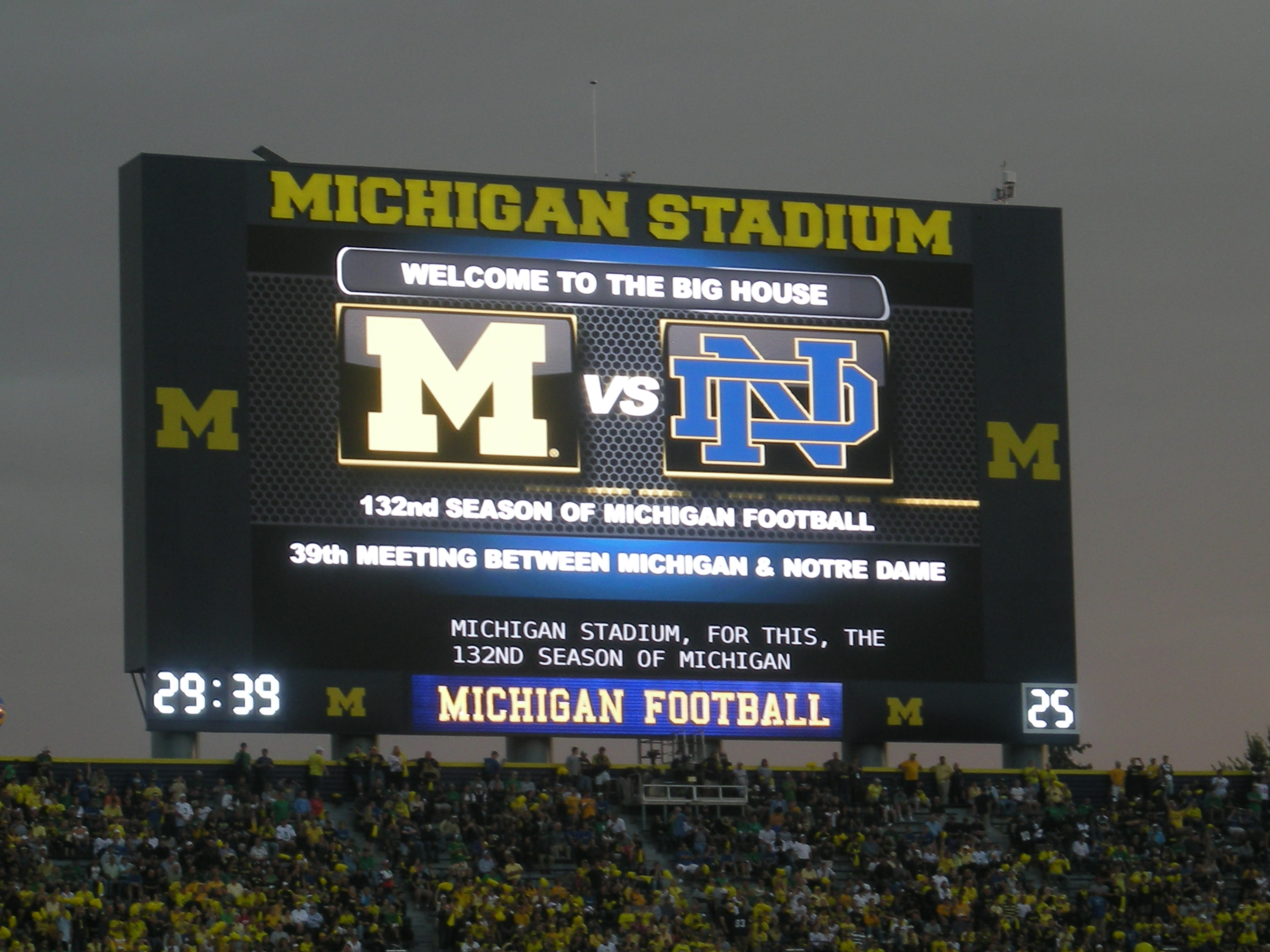
The new scoreboard before the stadium's first night game, Notre Dame vs. Michigan, September 10, 2011

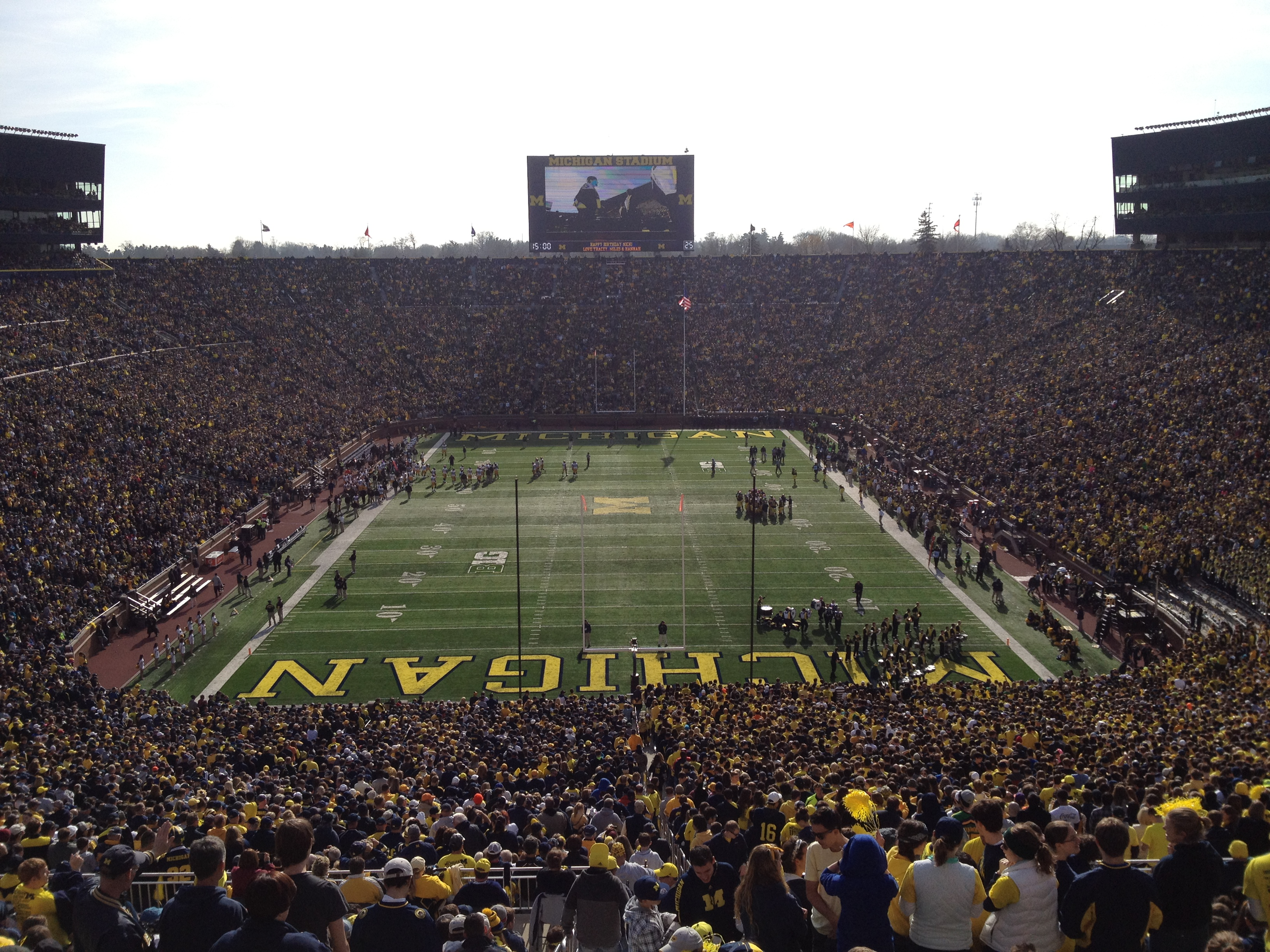
Michigan vs. Iowa at the start of the 2nd quarter on November 17, 2012

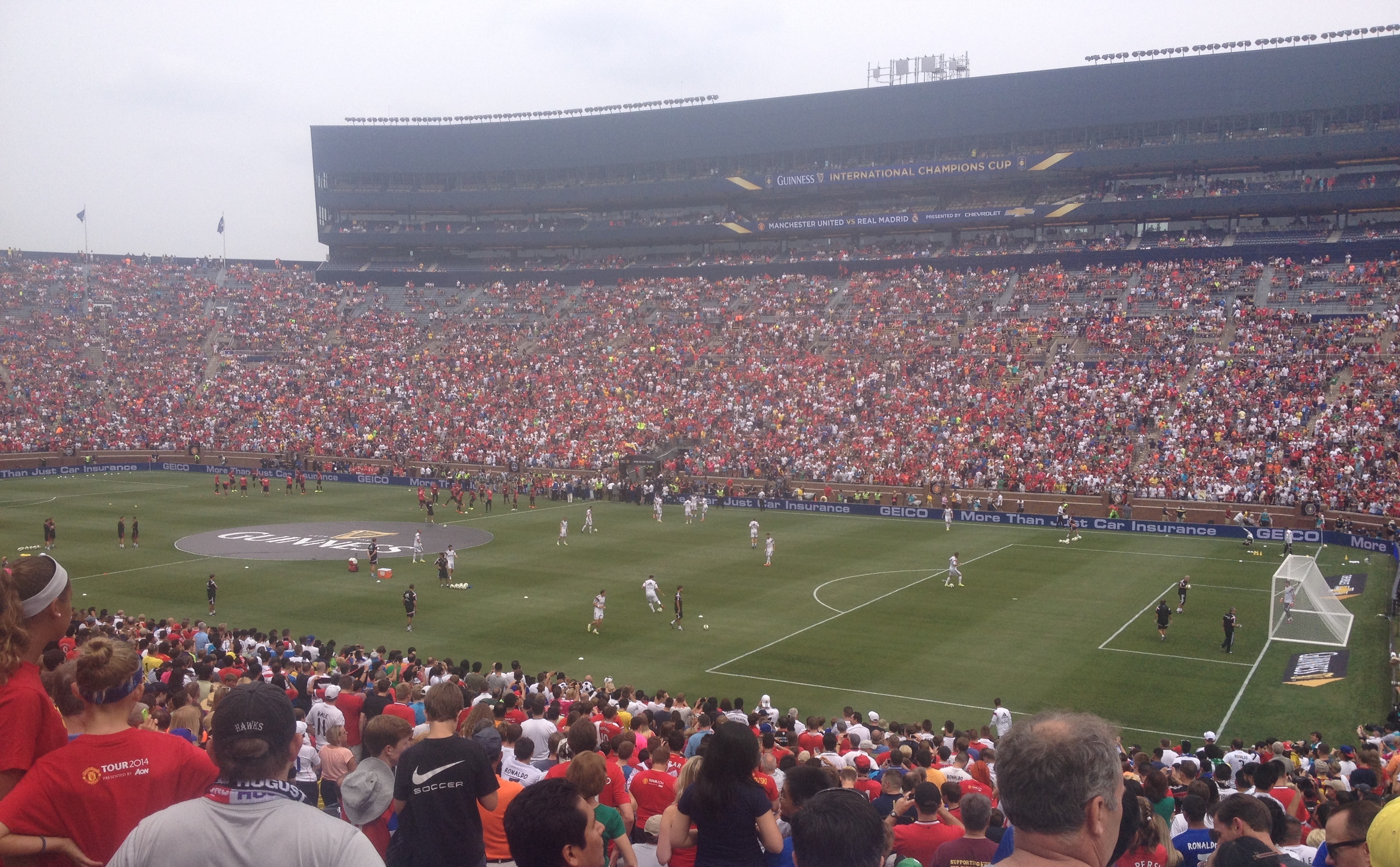
Real Madrid vs. Manchester United friendly game which set a record for most fans to watch a soccer game in the United States, August 2, 2014

== See also ==
- List of NCAA Division I FBS football stadiums
- List of stadiums by capacity
- Lists of stadiums

Events and tenants
| Preceded by Citizens Bank Park | Host of the NHL Winter Classic; 2014 | Succeeded by Nationals Park |
