= The Big Chill at the Big House =

2010 outdoor college ice hockey game

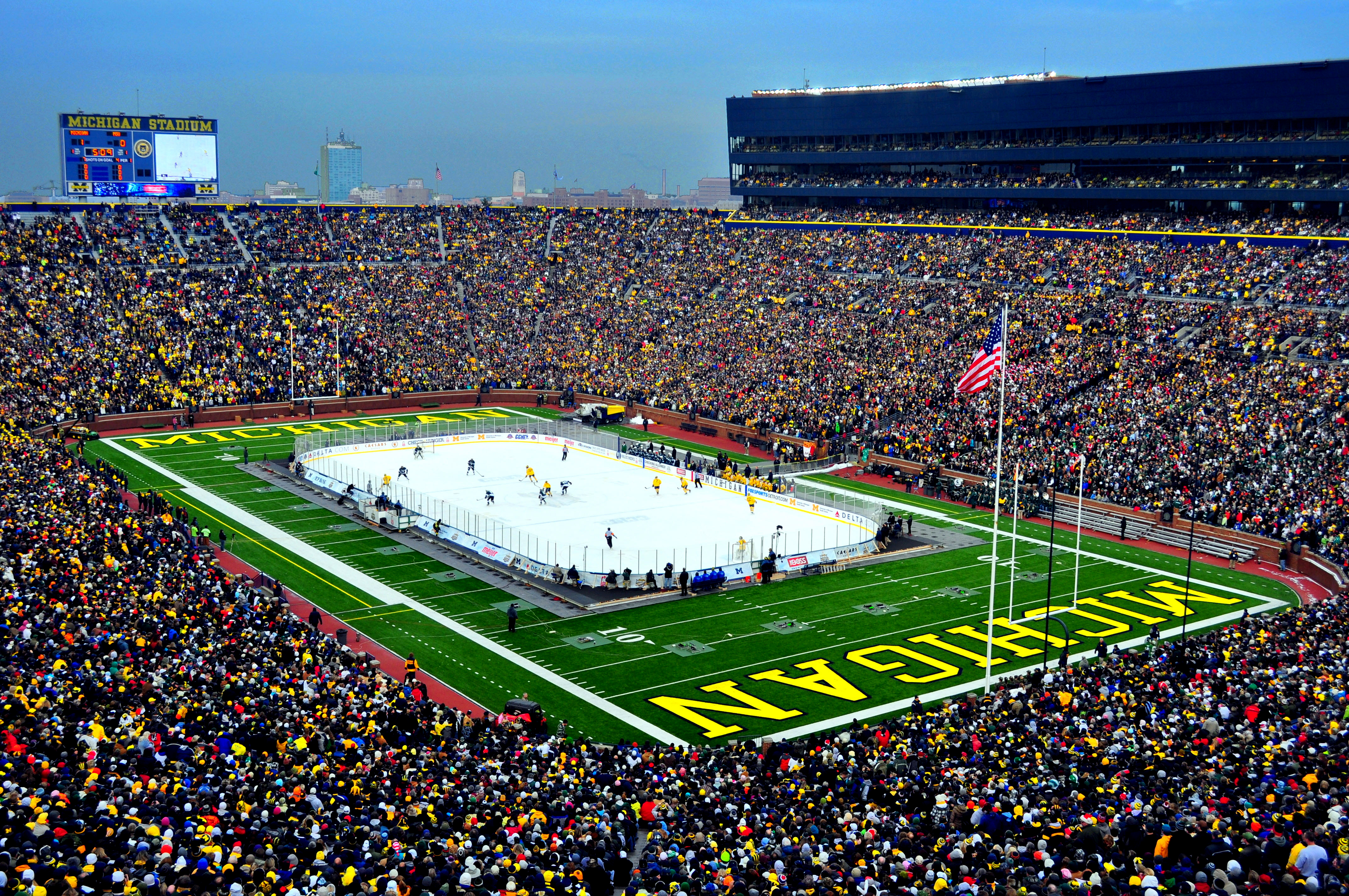
	1	2	3	Total
Michigan State	0	0	0	0
Michigan	2	1	2	5
- Date: December 11, 2010
- Venue: Michigan Stadium
- City: Ann Arbor, MI
- Attendance: 104,173 (certified), 113,411 (announced)

The Big Chill at the Big House (a.k.a. Cold War II) was an outdoor college ice hockey game played on December 11, 2010, at Michigan Stadium at the University of Michigan in Ann Arbor. The Michigan Wolverines men's team defeated its rival, the Michigan State Spartans, 5–0. In a rematch of the Cold War outdoor game between the teams in 2001, the "Big Chill" set a record for hockey attendance with an official attendance of 104,173.

== Previous Michigan outdoor games ==
The Wolverines had played two previous outdoor games in their history, both away from home.

=== Cold War ===
The Cold War was held on Saturday, October 6, 2001 between Michigan and Michigan State, held at Michigan State's football venue of Spartan Stadium in East Lansing, which resulted in a 3–3 tie in front of a crowd of 74,544.

=== Culver's Camp Randall Hockey Classic ===
On February 6, 2010, Michigan played another hockey rival, the University of Wisconsin, at the Badgers' football home of Camp Randall Stadium in Madison. In an event billed as the Culver's Camp Randall Hockey Classic, Wisconsin won, 3–2, in front of 55,301 fans. Game time temperature was 21 degrees F.

== Television ==
The game was broadcast locally by Fox Sports Detroit and nationally by the Big Ten Network, as well as in Ontario via Leafs TV. The game was available on the internet via Fox Sports Detroit's website, and in Alaska via KFXF.

== Festivities ==
The University of Michigan added permanent lighting to Michigan Stadium in time for the event. The University later announced that fireworks would be used when Michigan entered the ice during the game, as well as after every goal. Following the national anthem, a flyover was conducted by a B-2 Stealth Bomber.

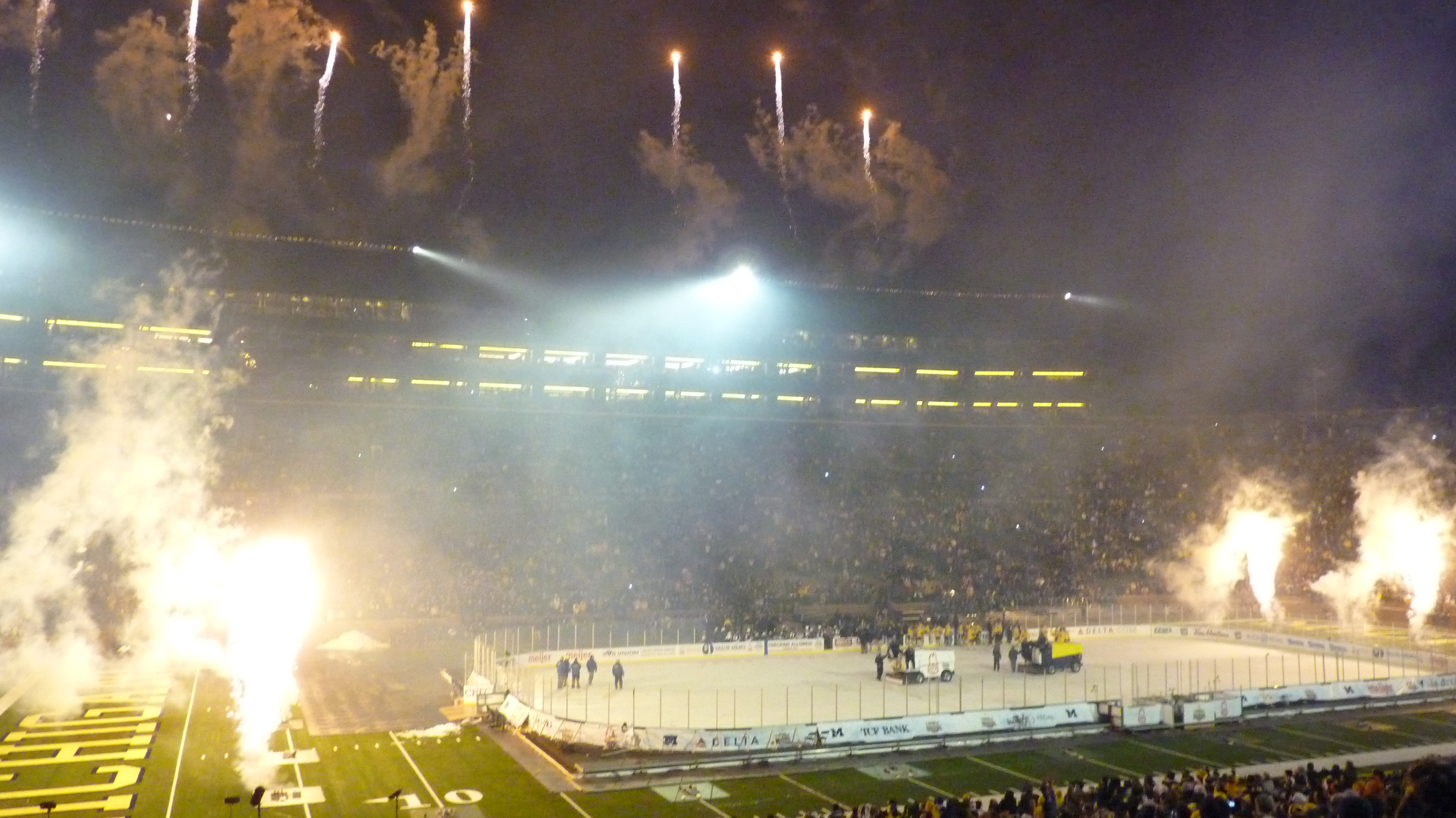
The fireworks extravaganza following The Big Chill at The Big House

A seven-minute fireworks show followed the game, conducted in unison with various songs from the soundtrack for the movie The Big Chill.

== Game summary ==
December 11, 2010	Michigan State	5–0	Michigan	Michigan Stadium	Recap

Michigan wore a vintage jersey for the event, which was worn from 1945 to 1948.

Michigan fired 29 shots on Michigan State goalie Drew Palmisano, while Michigan State fired 34 shots on Michigan goalie Shawn Hunwick, who recorded his first shutout of the season and the second of his career.

Scoring summary
Period	Team	Goal	Assist(s)	Time	Score
1st	MICH	Jon Merrill (4) – pp	Chad Langlais (6) and Ben Winnett (4)	12:04	1–0 MICH
1st	MICH	Jon Merrill (5)	Matt Rust (8) and Carl Hagelin (10)	14:54	2–0 MICH
2nd	MICH	Carl Hagelin (8) – pp	Matt Rust (9) and Brandon Burlon (7)	12:12	3–0 MICH
3rd	MICH	Carl Hagelin (9)	Matt Rust (10) Chad Langlais (7)	08:57	4–0 MICH
3rd	MICH	David Wohlberg (8)	Brandon Burlon (8)	10:45	5–0 MICH

=== Penalty summary ===
Period	Team	Player	Penalty	Time	PIM
1st	MICH	Kevin Lynch	Charging	02:20	2:00
1st	MSU	Dustin Gazley	Interference	11:48	2:00
2nd	MSU	Zach Josepher	Roughing	02:24	2:00
2nd	MICH	Chris Brown	Roughing	02:24	2:00
2nd	MICH	Brandon Burlon	High-sticking	03:33	2:00
2nd	MSU	Bench (served by Dean Chelios)	Too many men on the ice	05:53	2:00
2nd	MICH	Matt Rust	Holding the stick	07:48	2:00
2nd	MSU	Tim Buttery	Interference	10:30	2:00
3rd	MSU	Jake Chelios	Roughing	07:48	2:00
3rd	MSU	Matt Crandell	Roughing	12:23	2:00
3rd	MICH	Luke Glendening (served by Chris Brown)	Grabbing the facemask	12:23	2:00
3rd	MICH	Luke Glendening	Roughing	12:23	2:00
3rd	MICH	Carl Hagelin	Slashing	19:16	2:00

Shots by period
Team	1	2	3	Total
Michigan State	8	12	14	34
Michigan	8	10	11	29

Power play opportunities
Team	Goals/Opportunities
Michigan State	0/5
Michigan	3/4

Three star selections
	Team	Player	Statistics
1st	MICH	Jon Merrill	2 goals
2nd	MICH	Carl Hagelin	2 goals, 1 assist
3rd	MTL	Matt Rust	3 assists
4th*	MTL	Shawn Hunwick	34 saves, 1.000 SV%

- At the end of the game, Michigan goaltender Shawn Hunwick was named honorary 4th star of the Big Chill at the Big House to please the Michigan fans in attendance who were chanting his name.

== Team rosters ==
Michigan State Spartans				Michigan Wolverines			
#		Player	Position	#		Player	Position
4	(United States)	Trevor Nil	RW	3	(United States)	Scooter Vaughn	LW
5	(United States)	Brock Shelgren	D	6	(Canada)	Brandon Burlon	D
7	(United States)	Tim Buttery	D	7	(United States)	Chad Langlais	D
8	(United States)	Chris Forfar	C	8	(United States)	Jacob Fallon	C
9	(Canada)	Daultan Leveille	C	9	(United States)	Luke Moffat	RW
10	(United States)	Dustin Gazely	RW	10	(United States)	Chris Brown	RW
11	(Canada)	Brett Perlini	RW	11	(United States)	Kevin Lynch	LW
13	(United States)	Mike Merrifield	LW	12	(Sweden)	Carl Hagelin	LW
14	(United States)	Zach Josepher	D	13	(United States)	Lee Moffie	D
16	(United States)	Dean Chelios	LW	16	(Canada)	Ben Winnett	RW
17	(United States)	Matt Crandell	D	19	(United States)	Matt Rust	C
21	(United States)	Anthony Hayes	C	21	(United States)	A.J. Treais	C
22	(Canada)	Lee Reimer	LW	23	(United States)	Luke Glendening	RW
23	(Canada)	Matt Grassi	D	24	(United States)	Jon Merrill	D
27	(Canada)	Derek Grant	C	25	(United States)	David Wohlberg	LW
29	(United States)	Drew Palmisano	G	29	(Canada)	Louie Caporusso	C
37	(United States)	Will Yanakeff^{1}	G	30	(United States)	Adam Janecyk^{1}	G
42	(United States)	Jake Chelios	LW	31	(United States)	Shawn Hunwick	G
44	(United States)	Torey Krug	D	34	(United States)	Tristan Llewellyn	D
91	(Canada)	Zach Golembiewski	C	35	(United States)	Bryan Hogan^{2}	G
-	-	-	-	37	(United States)	Mac Bennett	D
(United States)		Head Coach: Rick Comley		(Canada)		Head Coach: Red Berenson	

^{1} Yanakeff and Janecyk served as reserve goaltenders and did not see playing time.
^{2} Hogan was originally the starter for Michigan, but suffered a groin injury that held him out of the game.

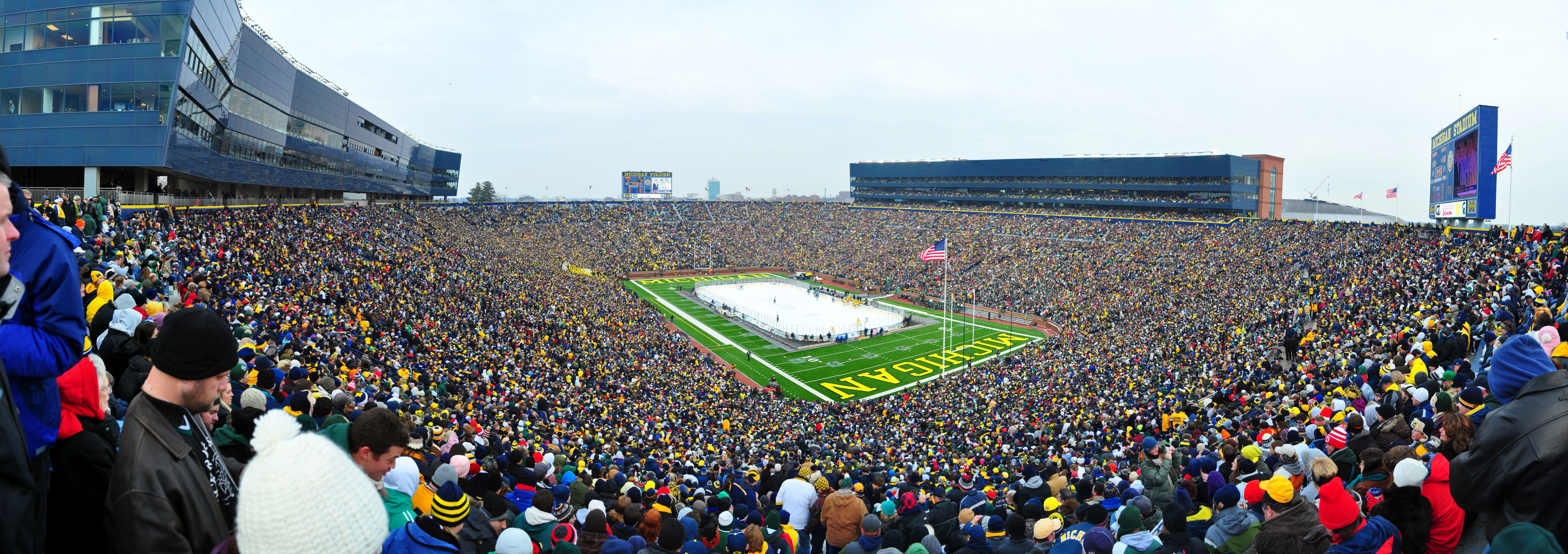

=== Officials ===
- Referees – Matt Shegos, Mark Wilkins
- Linesmen – Tony Molina, Bruce Vida

== See also ==
- 2014 NHL Winter Classic
- List of outdoor ice hockey games
- List of ice hockey games with highest attendance
