= Kaisaniemi =

Area in Kluuvi, Helsinki, Finland

Coordinates: 60°10′20″N 24°56′51″E

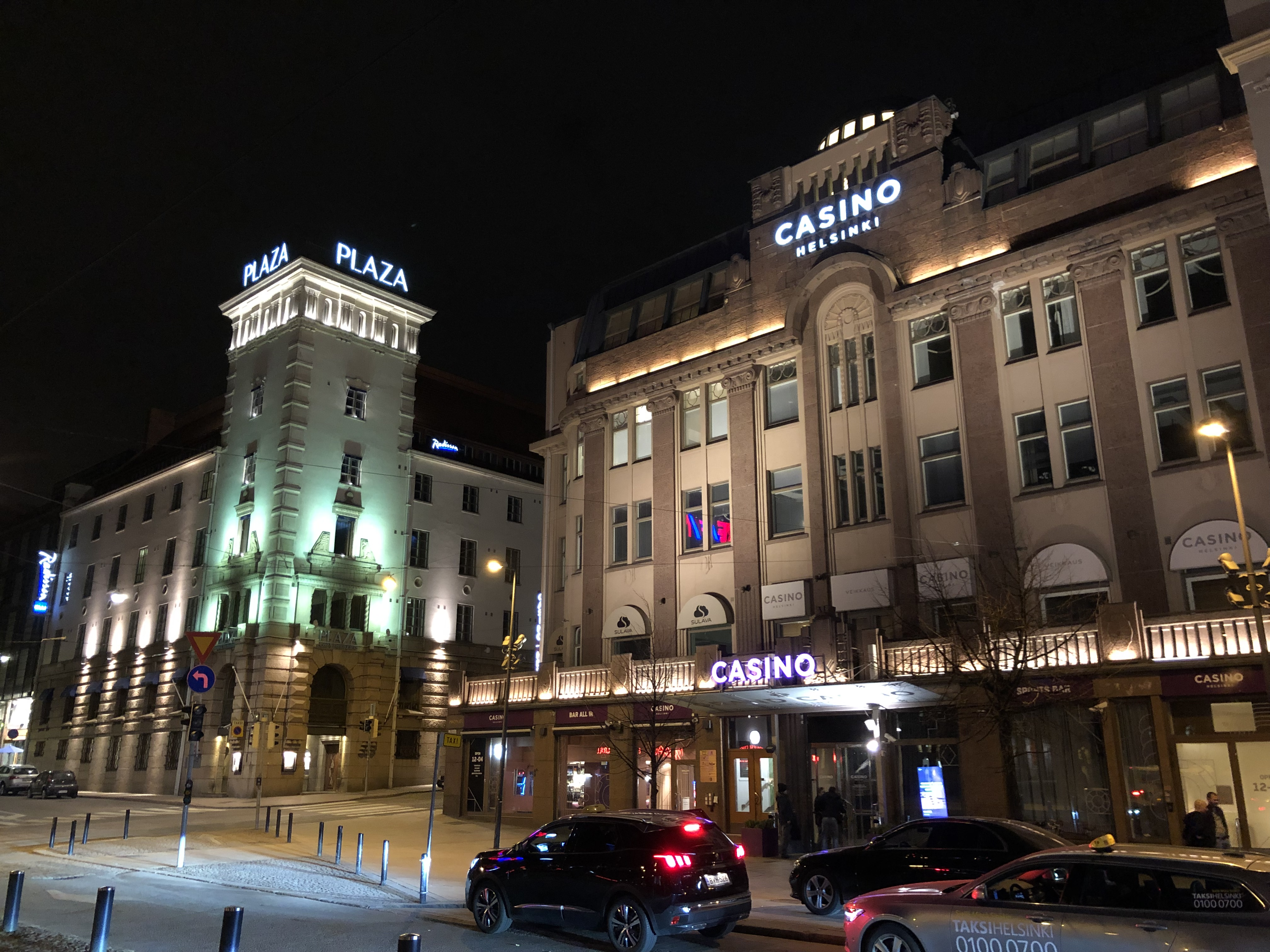
Plaza Hotel and Helsinki Casino in Kaisaniemi.

Kaisaniemi (Swedish: Kajsaniemi) is a part of the centre of Helsinki, Finland, located immediately east of the Helsinki Central railway station and south of Hakaniemi. Kaisaniemi is part of the Vironniemi district and neighbourhood of Kluuvi.

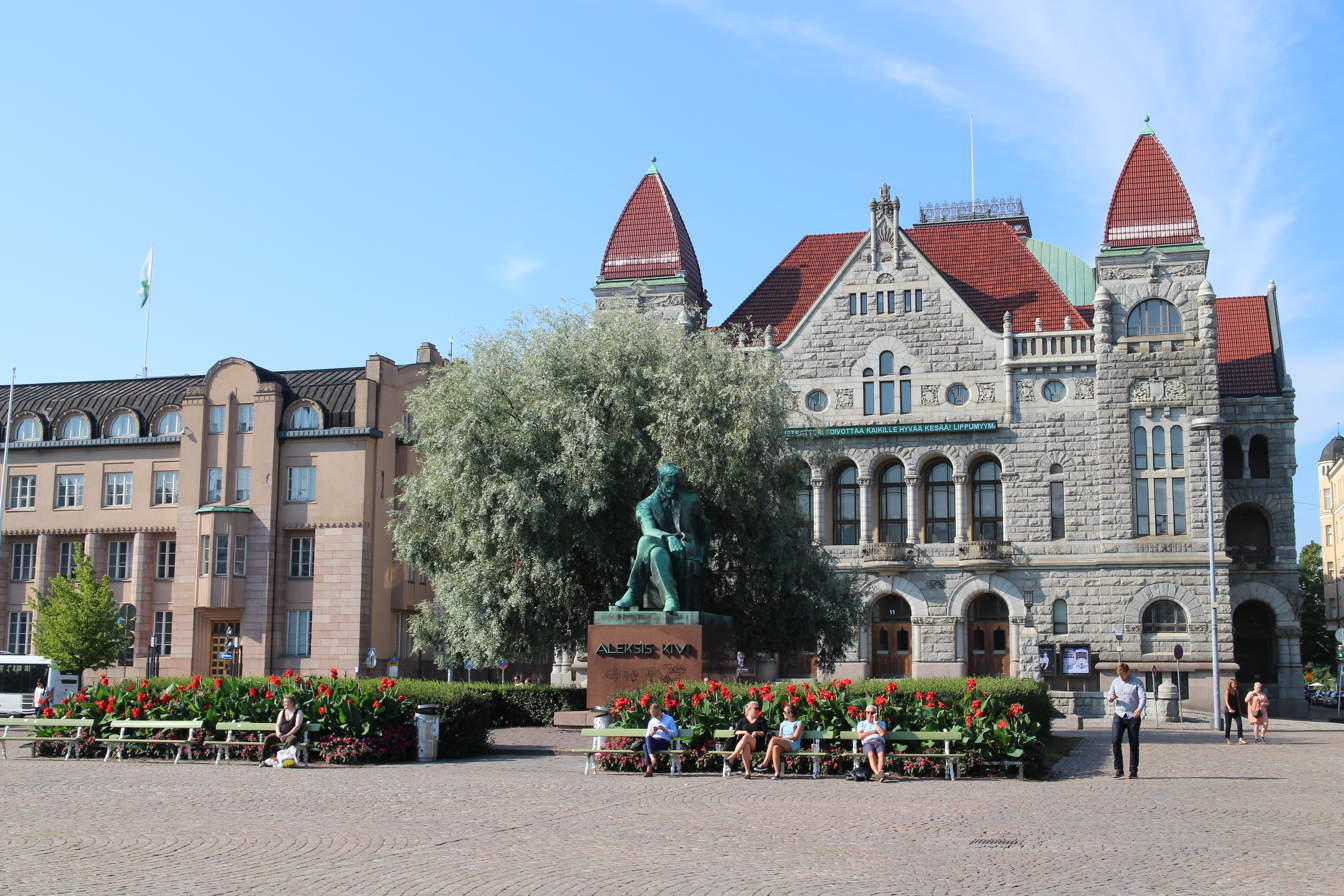
Finnish National Theatre in Kaisaniemi.

The Kaisaniemi district was founded around the 1920s, when in 1927, Catharina "Cajsa" Wahllund founded a restaurant in the area. The restaurant, known as "Cajsan Helmi", later influenced the name of the district surrounding it. The reason for the similarity between the Finnish and Swedish names is that unlike the typical naming scheme of most districts in Helsinki, as Kaisaniemi was named originally in Finnish, with the name being reused in the Swedish district name, with only a minor orthographic change, instead of translating the Finnish word "niemi" into Swedish.

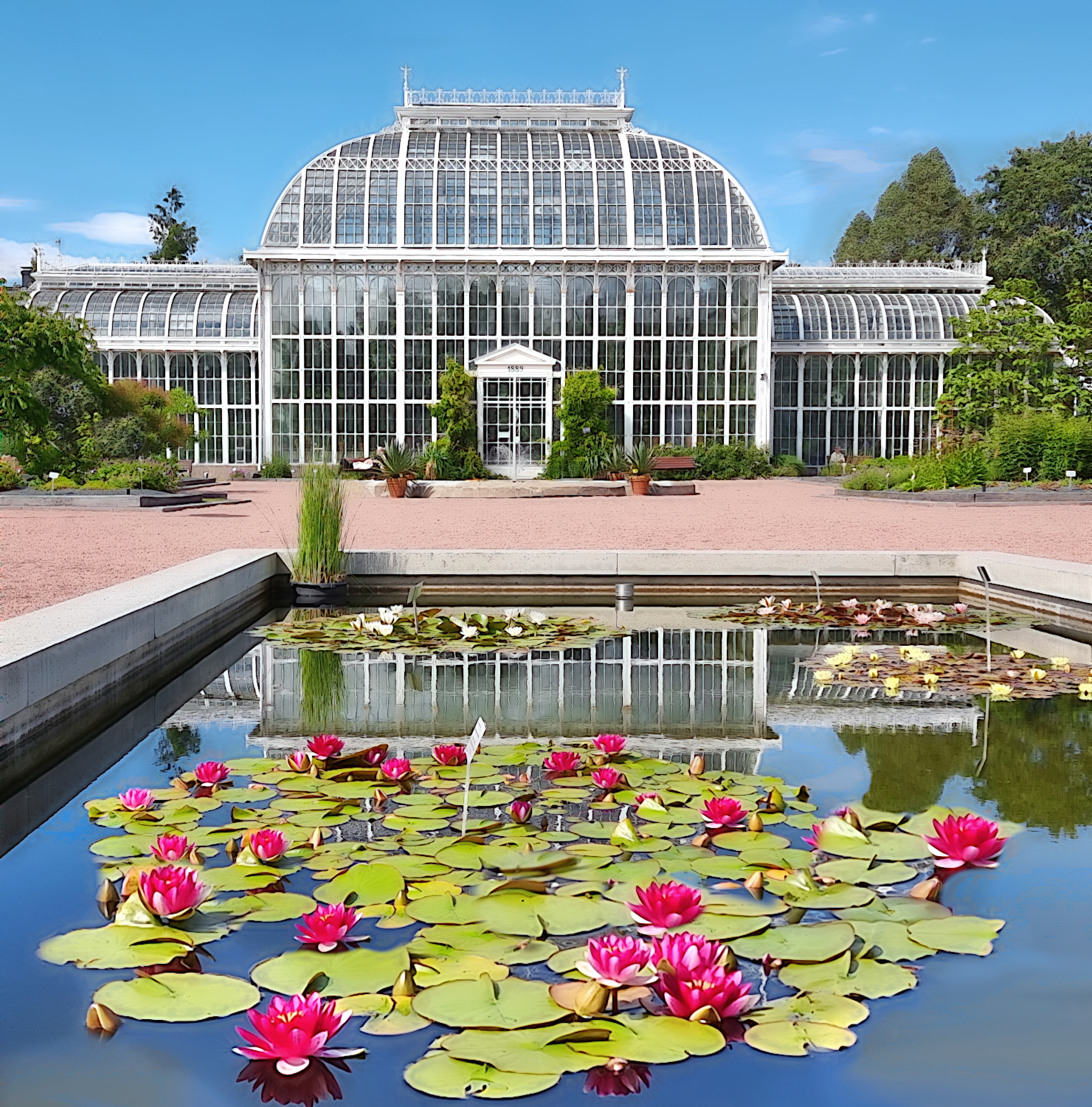
University of Helsinki Botanical Garden.

Kaisaniemi is well known for Kaisaniemi park, which covers roughly 17 hectares near the city centre. Kaisaniemi has Kinopalatsi, the second largest movie theatre in Helsinki. It is also the site of the fine University of Helsinki Botanical Garden and glasshouses. Kaisaniemi is served by the University of Helsinki metro station (known as Kaisaniemi before 2015), opened in 1995. The Finnish National Theatre, Helsinki Casino and a number of hotels are located in the area. The Green League party of Finland traditionally holds their less formal events and happenings at the Restaurant Kaisaniemi.
