= Fashion show =

Event of displaying latest clothing and apparel collection

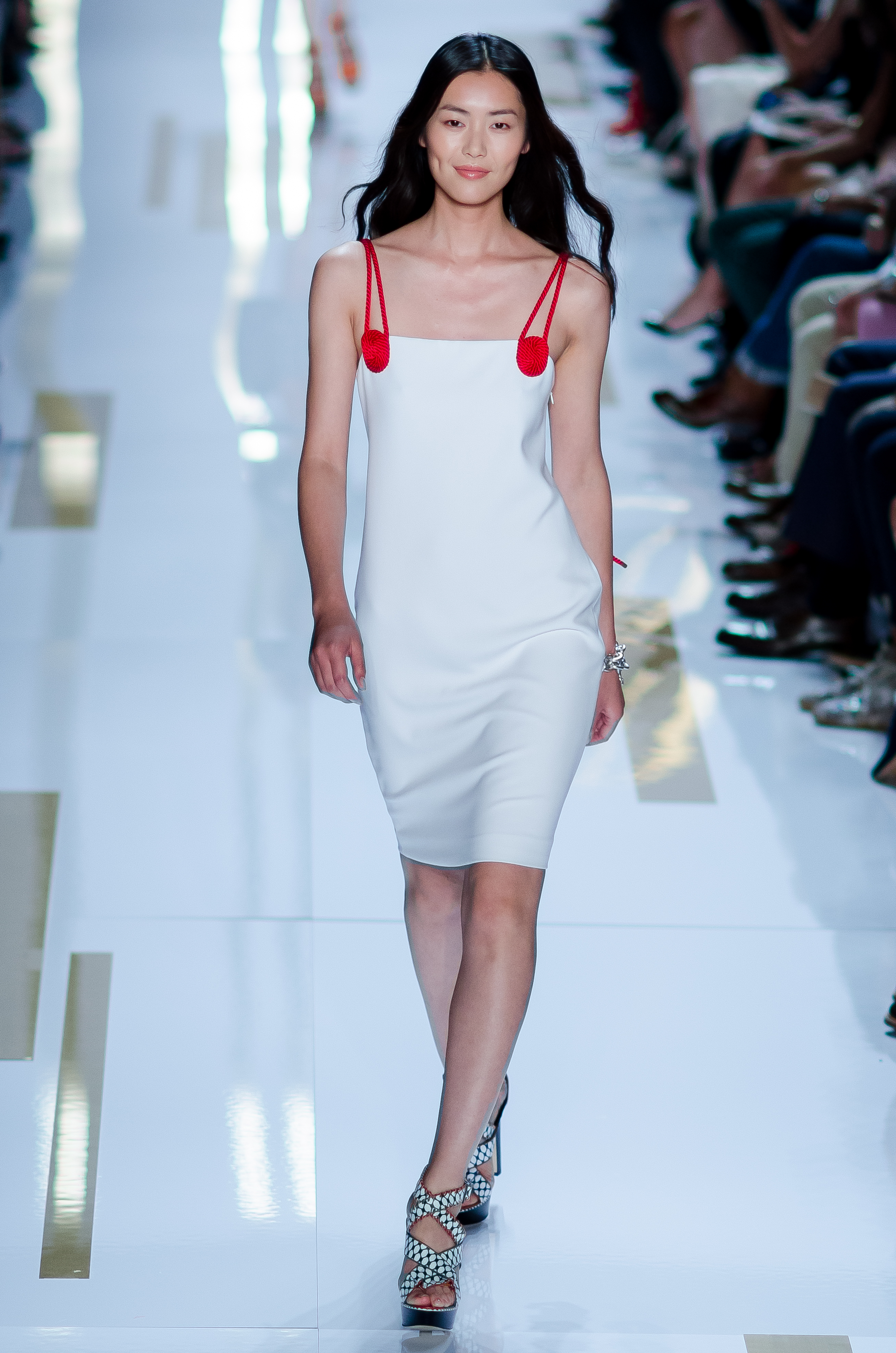
Liu Wen, a supermodel, walking the catwalk as she models fashions by designer Diane von Fürstenberg at New York Fashion Week in 2013

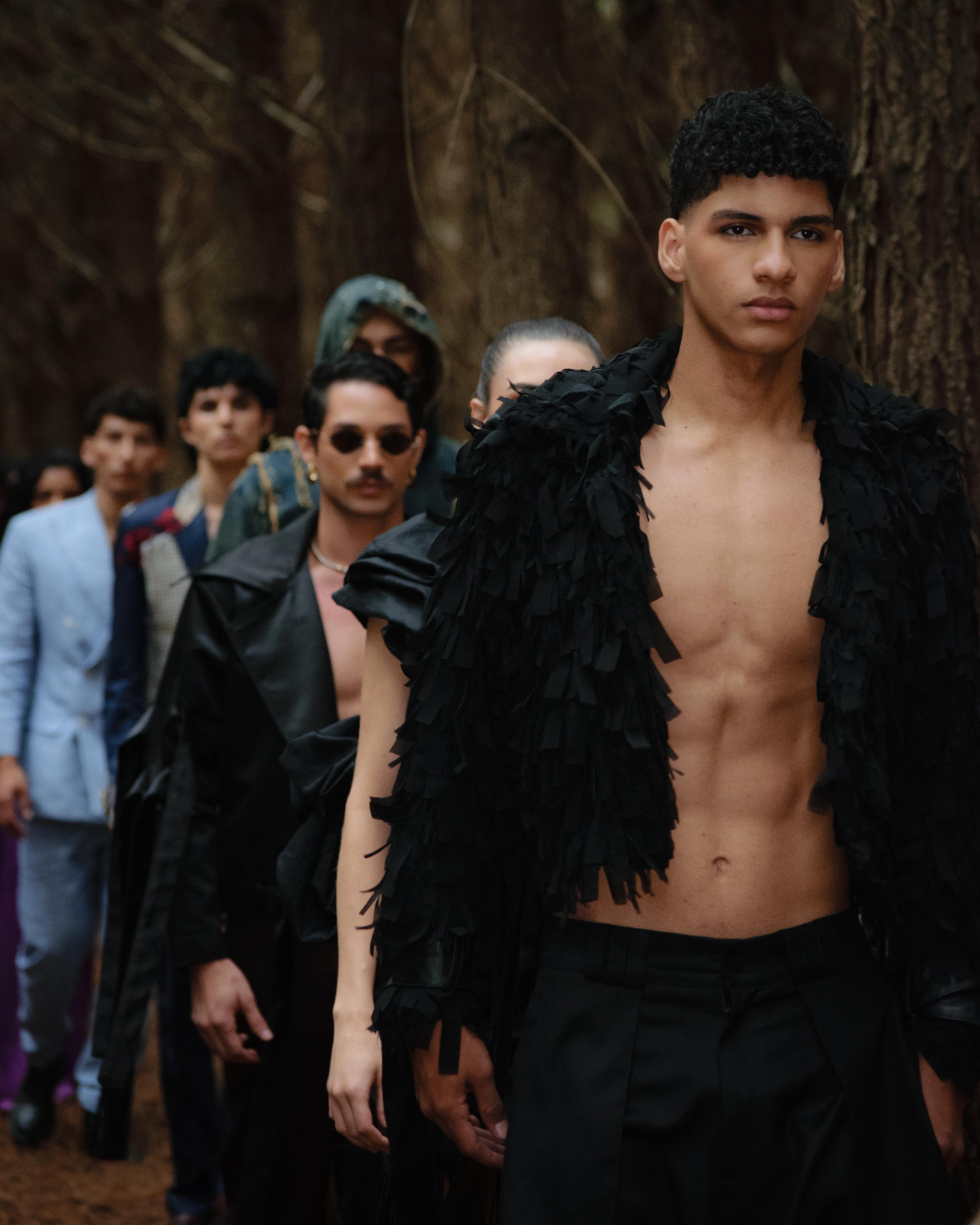
Donovan Walking the runway for the closing of the launch of Cali Fashion Week in Colombia

A fashion show is an event put on by a fashion designer to showcase their upcoming line of clothing and/or accessories during a fashion week. Fashion shows debut every season, particularly the spring/summer and fall/winter seasons. This is where designers seek to promote their new fashions. The four major fashion weeks in the world, collectively known as the "Big 4", are those held in New York City, London, Milan, and Paris. Berlin Fashion Week is also of global importance.

In a typical fashion show, models walk the catwalk dressed in the clothing created by the designer. Clothing is illuminated on the catwalk using lighting and special effects. The order in which each model walks out, wearing a specific outfit, is usually planned in accordance with the statement that the designer wants to make about their collection. It is then up to the audience to try to understand what the designer is trying to "say", visually deconstruct each outfit and appreciate the detail and craftsmanship of every piece.

Occasionally, fashion shows take the form of installations, where the models are static, standing or sitting in a constructed environment. A wide range of contemporary designers produce their shows as theatrical productions, with elaborate sets and added elements such as live music or a technological components such as holograms or pre-recorded video backdrops.

== History ==
=== 19th and 20th centuries ===
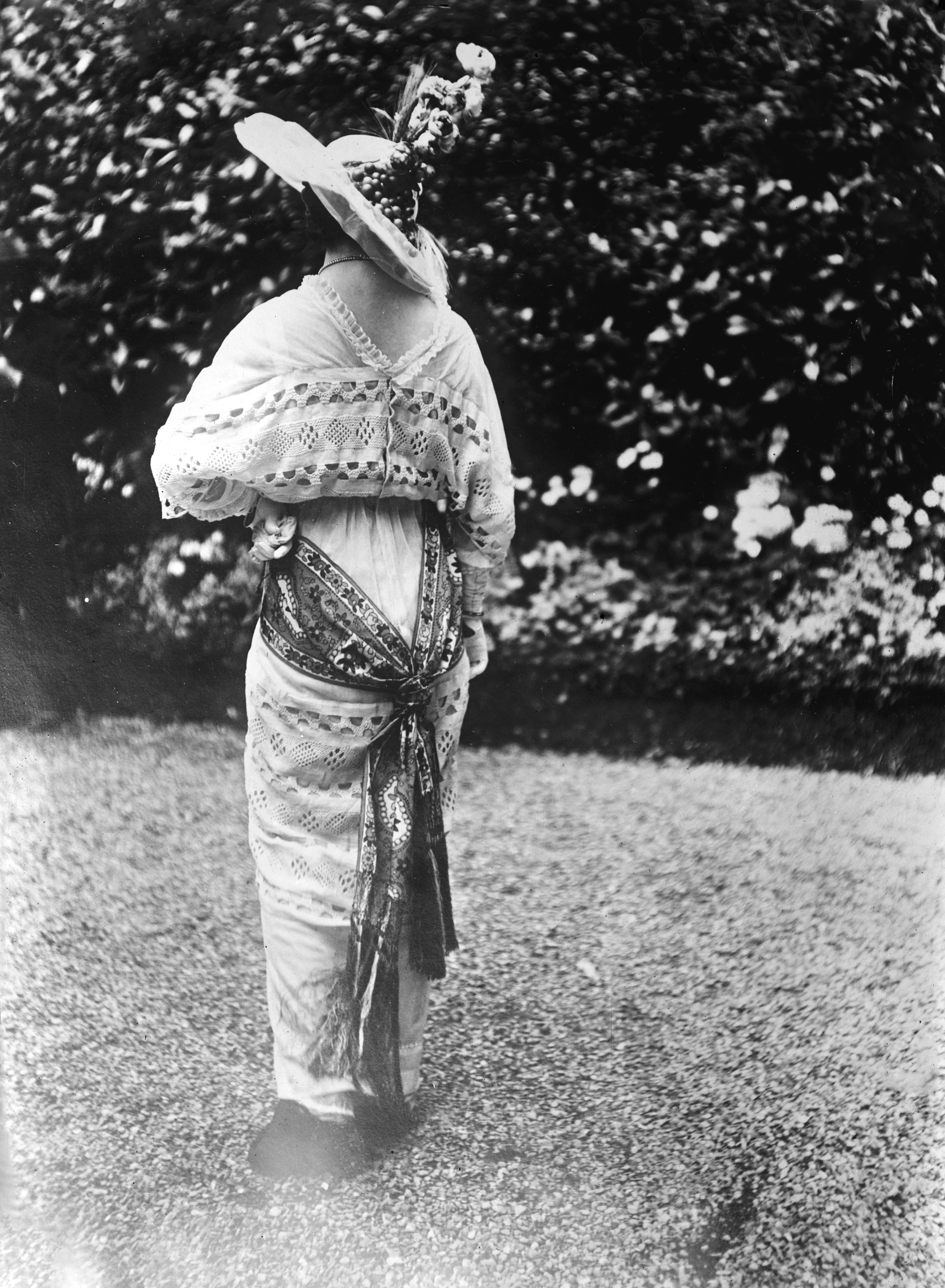
Paris fashion and runway at the turn of the century

The origins of fashion shows remain ambiguous to historians, as there has yet to be a comprehensive study on the subject. One of the designers of this concept, Charles Frederick Worth, gained traction by displaying clothes on actual people instead of mannequins. By the end of the 19th century, "fashion parades" were regularly organized at Paris couture salons. American retailers imported the concept of the fashion show in the early 1900s. The first American fashion show likely took place in 1903 in the New York City store of the Ehrlich Brothers. By 1910, large department stores such as Wanamaker's in Manhattan and Philadelphia were also staging fashion shows. These events showed couture gowns from Paris or the store's copies of them; they aimed to demonstrate the owners' good taste and capture the attention of female shoppers. As the popularity for these formal presentations expanded, it was in 1918 when fashion houses established fixed dates for runway shows to occur. These occurrences took place twice annually, specifically for fashion houses to plan for and promote their lines to foreign buyers. Runway shows were often held in department stores or hotels when they first began. European fashion houses would actively seek out buyers in the United States, specifically in larger cities, by hosting these runway shows.

By the 1920s, retailers across the United States held fashion shows. Often, these shows were theatrical, presented with narratives, and organized around a theme (e.g. Parisian, Chinese, or Russian). These shows enjoyed huge popularity through mid-century, sometimes attracting thousands of customers and gawkers.

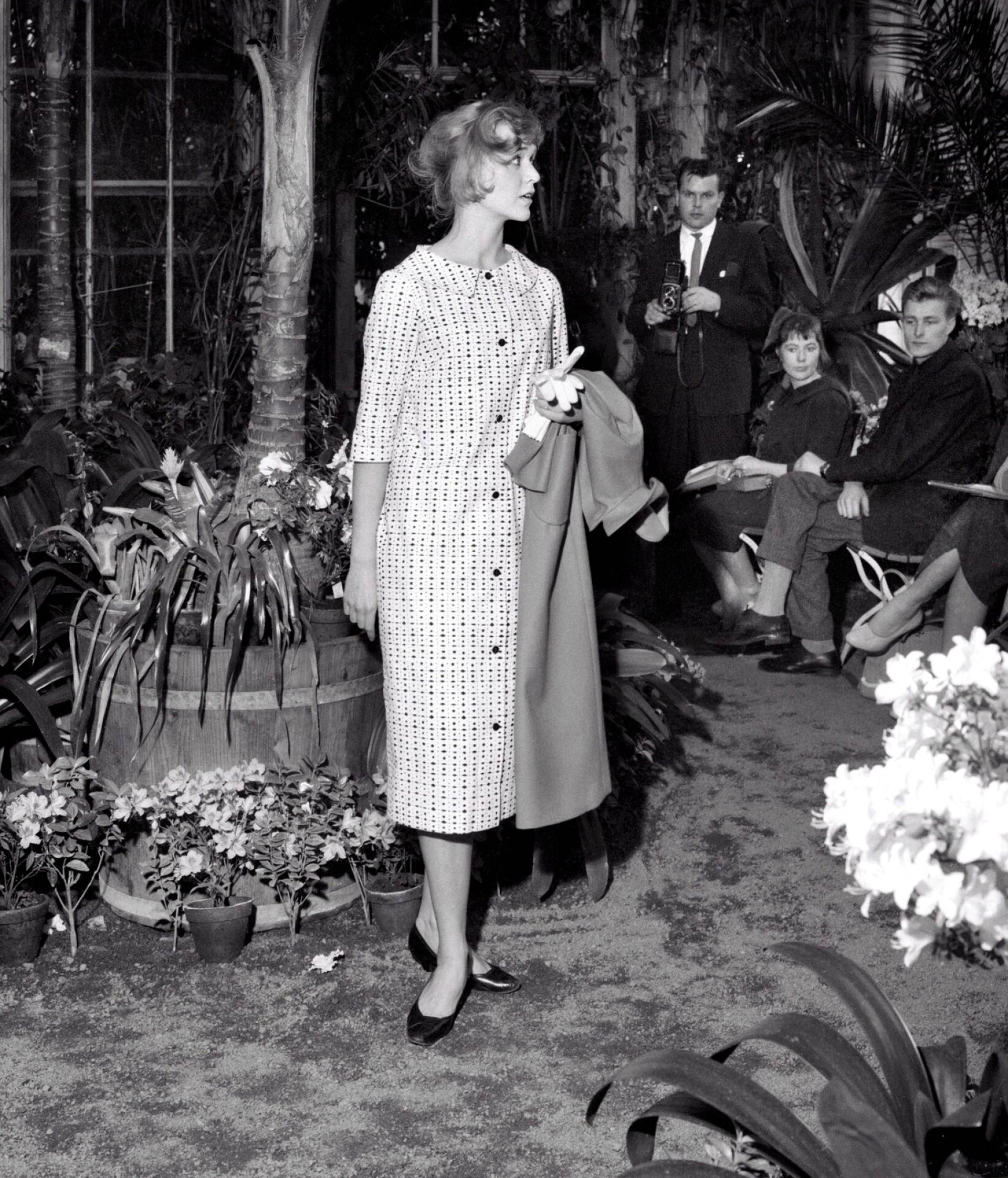
Finnish actress Elina Salo presenting clothes designed by Vuokko Nurmesniemi at a fashion show in the Helsinki Botanical Garden in 1958

In the 1970s and 1980s, American designers began to hold their own fashion shows in private spaces separate from such retailers. In the early 1990s, however, many in the fashion world began to rethink this strategy. Fern Mallis, who was the executive director of the Council of Fashion Designers of America at the time, remembered that following a series of accidents at shows held in small, hazardous venues, the prevailing attitude was, "We love fashion but we don't want to die for it." In response to these shows, the New York shows were centralized in Bryant Park during Fashion Week in late 1993.

=== 21st century ===
Some designers have attempted to modernize the style and presentation of fashion shows by integrating technological advances in experimental ways, such as including pre-recorded digital videos as backdrops. During New York Fashion Week in 2014, designer Ralph Lauren presented his new Polo line for Spring 2015 in a water-screen projection in Manhattan's Central Park. Technological progress has also allowed a broader portion of the fashion industry's followers to experience shows. In 2010, London Fashion Week was the first fashion week to allow viewing of its shows through live streaming. Live streaming of runway shows and mediated shows has now become commonplace.

Tom Ford created a music video with Lady Gaga for his Spring/Summer 2016 women's collection.

In the 21st century, fashion shows are usually also filmed and appear on specially assigned television channels or even in documentaries. Shows have also become increasingly elaborate for many of the top labels, including sprawling sets that often come with higher costs.

Fashion shows present the latest seasonal styles, functioning as both a walking art exhibition and a blueprint for fast fashion stores that replicate high fashion designs. While they can sometimes be perceived as shocking, this is often intentional, serving the crucial purpose of generating publicity. For many others, fashion shows also represent a way of life and establish the annual mood. Attendees of the performances also get to see an artistic medium firsthand and network with professionals in the field. Fashion presentations have evolved in the digital age, with the epidemic hastening this transition.

== Format and setting ==
A runway may be as basic as a narrow space between rows of chairs or more elaborate setups with multiple catwalks. Most runway shows are held inside, for shelter against the weather, but there are times when runway shows are held outdoors. In the 2016 Paris Fashion Week, Chanel presented an elaborate setup by designing the hall as if it were an airport. The viewing guests sat as if they were awaiting their flights while the models walked around the airport approaching ticket counters.

== Models ==
With the creation of runway shows, the concept of runway modeling was rapidly established with the establishment of agencies and professional modeling careers. Before professional agencies, fashion houses that runway shows often had their own in house models who would specifically be fitted and costumes for each show. By having in house models to present the clothes for runway, the fashion houses could ensure that the clothing was perfectly altered for presentation and bound to sell. However, as the demand for models grew, the modeling agency was established to represent runway models.

=== Inclusivity ===
Fashion shows have historically been exclusive, featuring predominantly young, thin, tall, and Eurocentric models. Over the past decade, the industry has shifted toward broader representation. Vogue, an influential fashion institution, has long marginalized bodies outside the conventional sample sizes. According to their most recent report, runway representation of nonwhite models increased from about 15% in 2015 to over 40% by 2023 at many fashion weeks. In 2015, plus-size and curve models accounted for less than 1% of runway appearances. Between 2022 and 2023, around 6% of models were larger than US size 0–2. In the Spring/Summer 2026 season, less than 1% of models were plus-size (US 14+). This represents roughly a 9% increase in plus-size representation on catwalks over the past ten years.

Casting models that are larger than size 4 remains challenging for brands as they typically cast shows only days in advance, and models must fit into existing sample sizes. Casting larger models requires planning and producing various sample sizes, which is costly. Even when designers create inclusive collections, retailers often purchase only the smaller sizes.

Some designers, such as Christian Siriano, Chromat, and Collina Strada, have cast plus-size, transgender, nonbinary, disabled, and racially diverse models on the runway. Brands including Savage X Fenty, Tommy Hilfiger (Adaptive), Mugler, and Pyer Moss have expanded representation by featuring models of diverse ages, abilities, genders, and cultural backgrounds.

== Catwalk ==
The term catwalk originates from the walkway, stage platform, or clearing used by models to demonstrate clothing and accessories during a fashion show. Catwalks are used by designers to introduce new fashion lines and introduce new designers that grab the attention of consumers. In fashion jargon, "what's on the catwalk" or similar phrasing can refer to whatever is new and popular in fashion. Some, especially in the United States, refer to the catwalk as a runway.

== Terminology ==
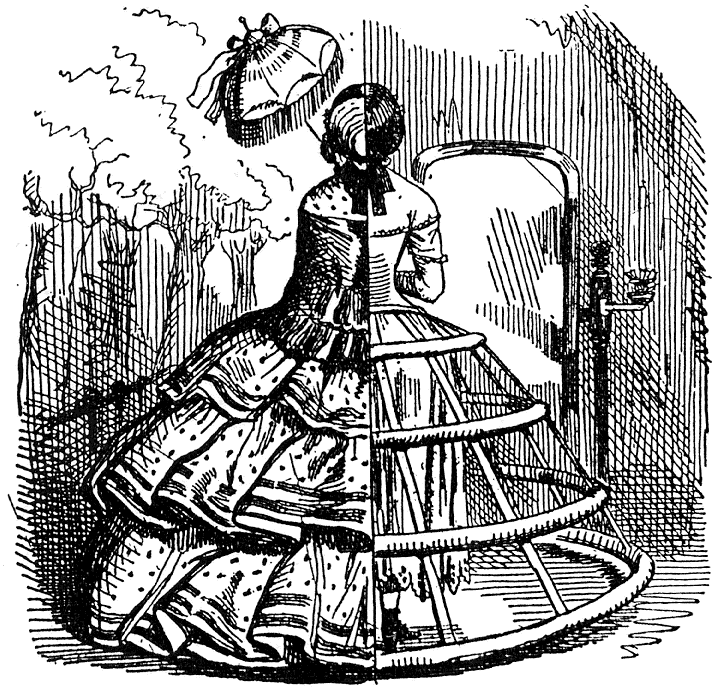
Fashion sketching before live runway presentation

- Exclusive: When a model scores an exclusive for a fashion label, this means that they have been picked to walk for that particular designer only. This might launch their career, elevate their status in the fashion industry and 'guarantee' them spots on the world's best catwalks.
- Haute couture: A French phrase for high fashion. Runway shows were created to specifically display custom garments such as Haute couture.
- Look book: A collection of photos taken of models wearing a designer's or manufacturer's clothing, that is sent out to fashion editors, buyers, clients, and special customers to show the designer's looks for the season.
- Sketches: Sketches, or illustrations, were the first way that designers would present clientele with their line. This is before mannequins and live runway models were established within the industry.

== Gallery ==
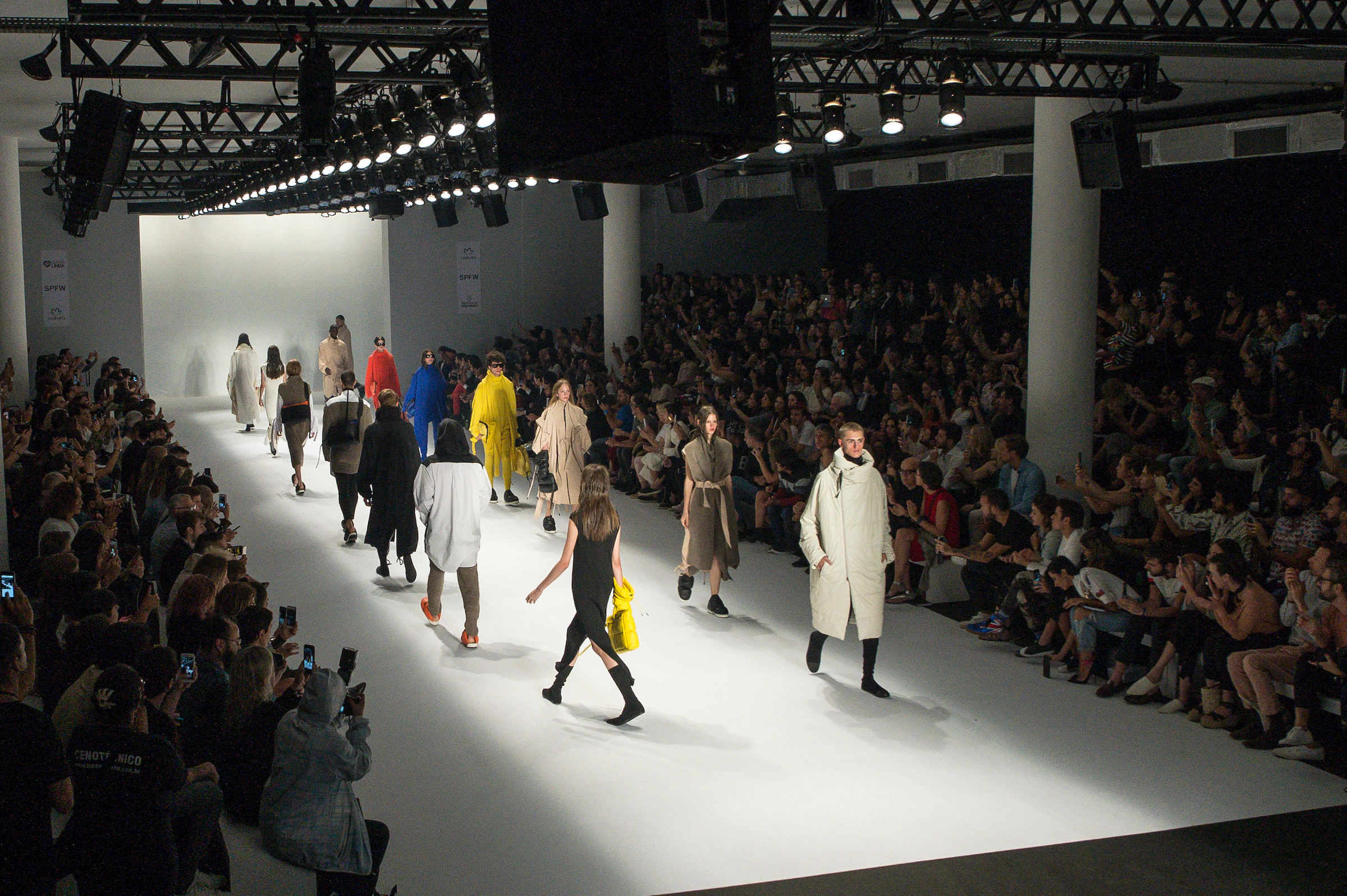
Models on the runway at São Paulo Fashion Week, 2017

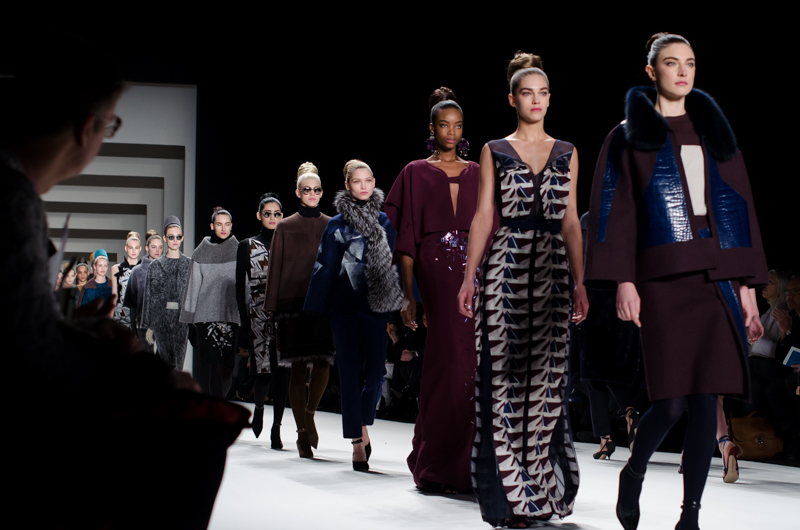
Haute couture fashion models walking the catwalk at the Carolina Herrera show during New York Fashion Week in 2014

== See also ==
- Fashion
- Fashion design
- Fashion trend
- Fashion week
- Fetish fashion
- Haute couture
- List of fashion events
- List of individual dresses
