= Kaisaniemi Park =

Public park in central Helsinki, Finland

Coordinates: 60°10′29″N 24°56′45″E

Kaisaniemi park (Finnish: Kaisaniemen puisto, Swedish: Kajsaniemiparken) is a popular park, in the center of Helsinki, in the region of Kluuvi. The Kaisaniemi Park was named after Catharina "Cajsa" Wahllund. Part of the park was given to the University of Helsinki in 1829, for gardening. The oldest greenhouse was opened in 1889.

In the park, is the oldest public memorial in Helsinki, called Freemason's Grave, there's also a football pitch, basketball and tennis courts.

It is a place of several events, including concerts, the World Village event and The Tuska Open Air metal festival, which was held there from 2001 to 2010.

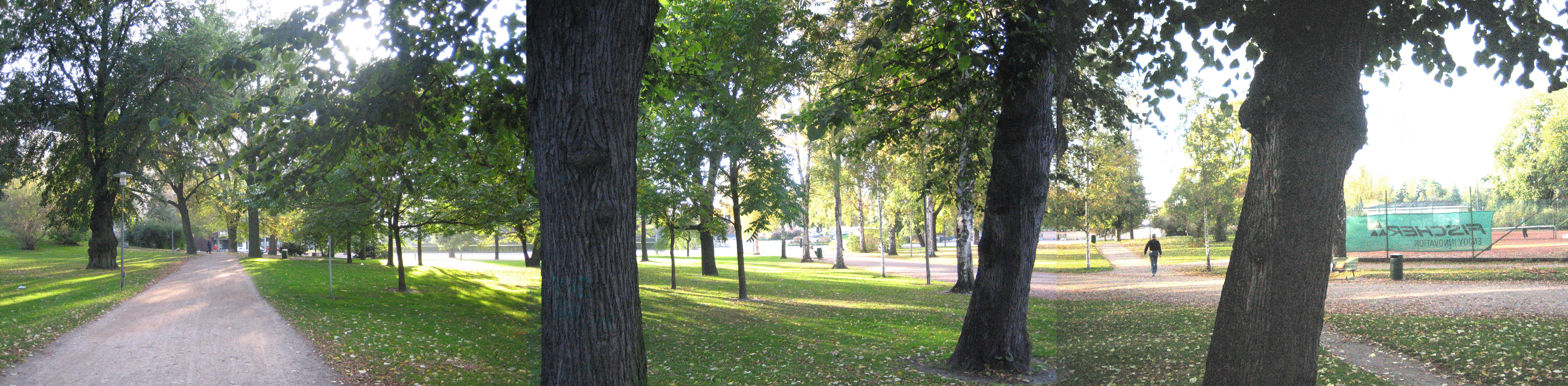
Kaisaniemi park during the summer of 2005

It usually hosts the Helsinki Day concert. It also hosted the Norwegian pop duo Marcus and Martinus in June 2018.

Kaisaniemi park has been in media attention because of problems with criminality, especially with drug use and trade. The problem with criminality has got worse during the park multi-year renovation in the beginning of the 2020s.

== Pictures from the park ==
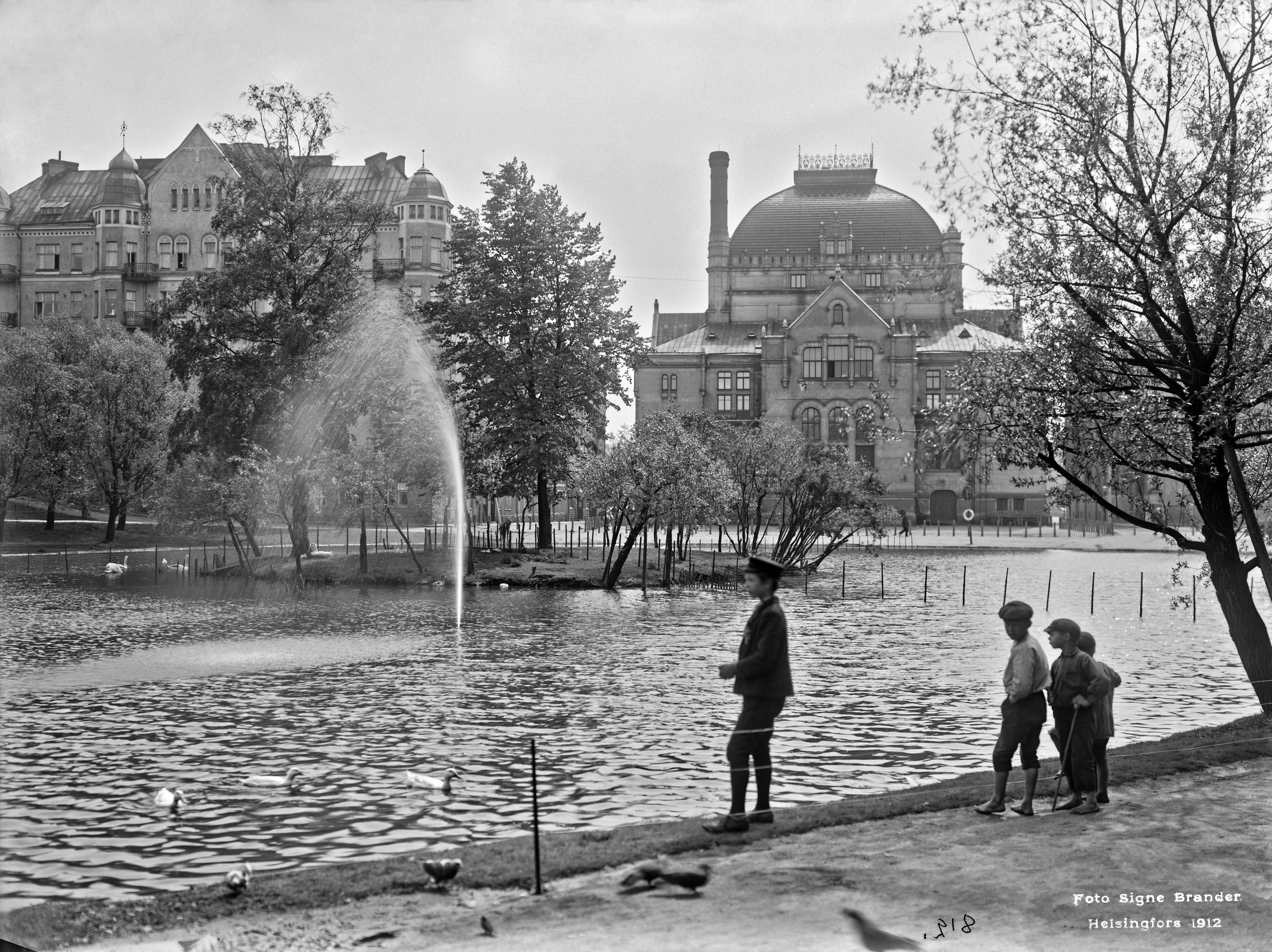
Fountain with the national theater in the background, 1912

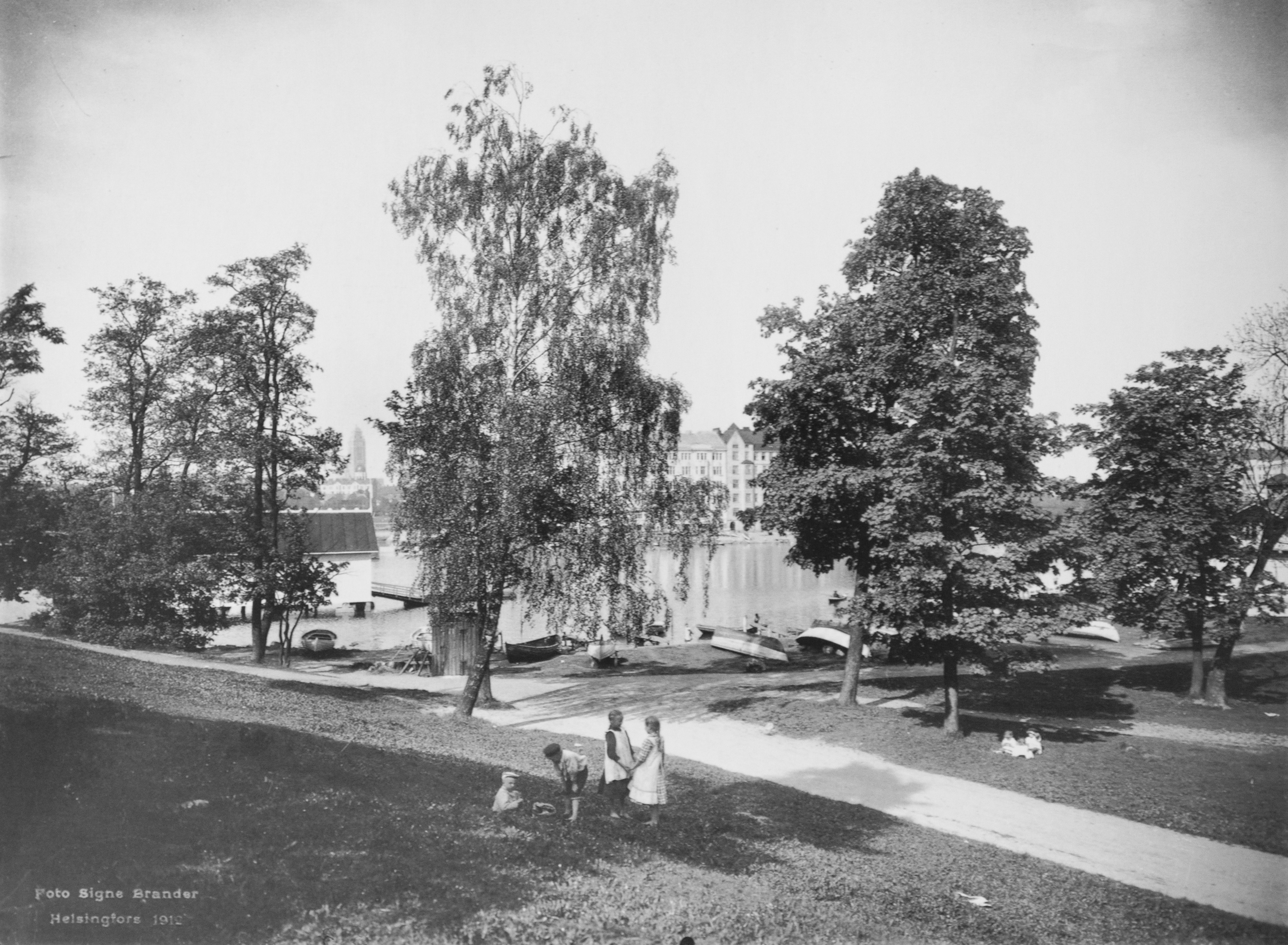
View with the Kallio Church in the background, 1912

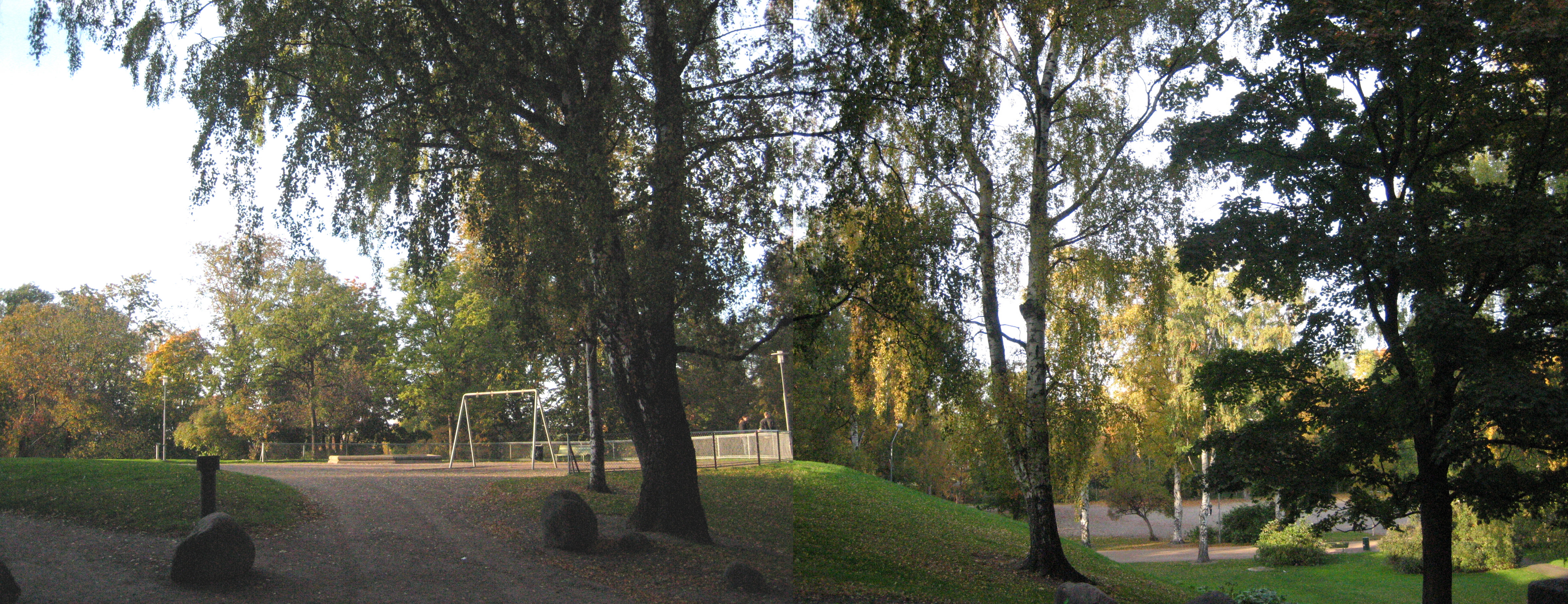
View from Vuorikatu street

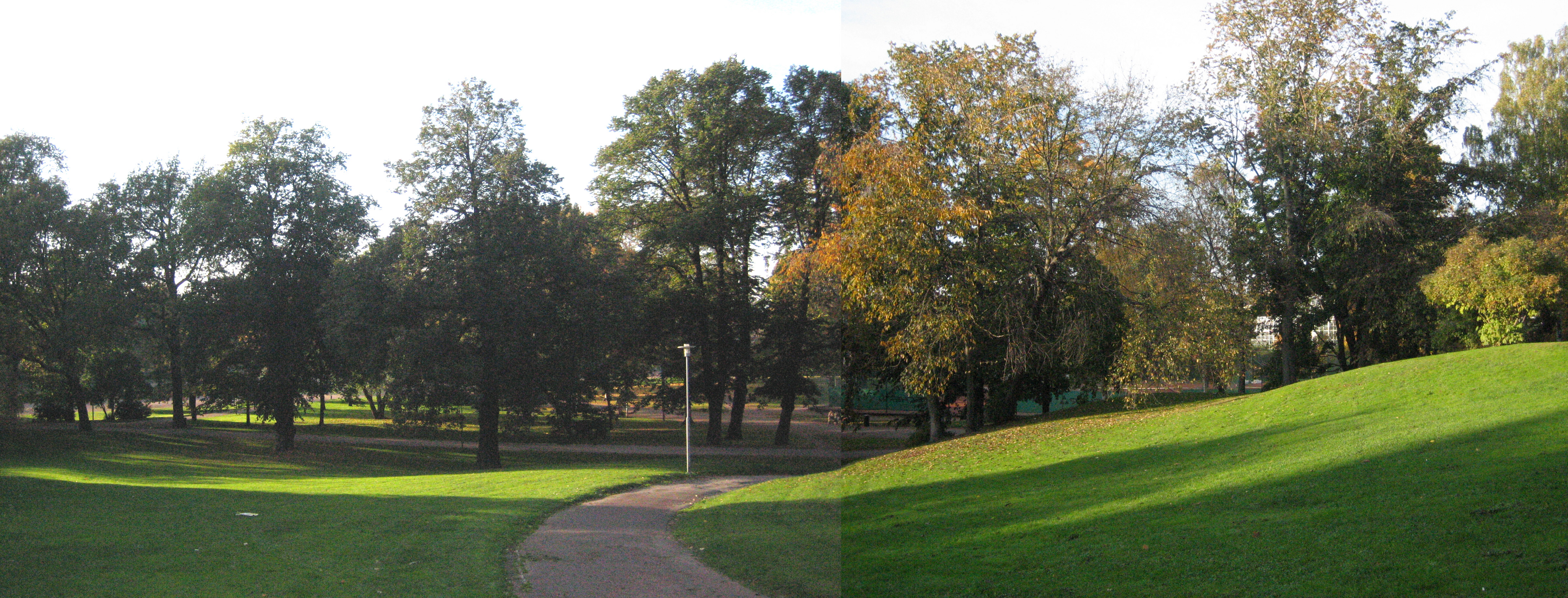
View from east-south

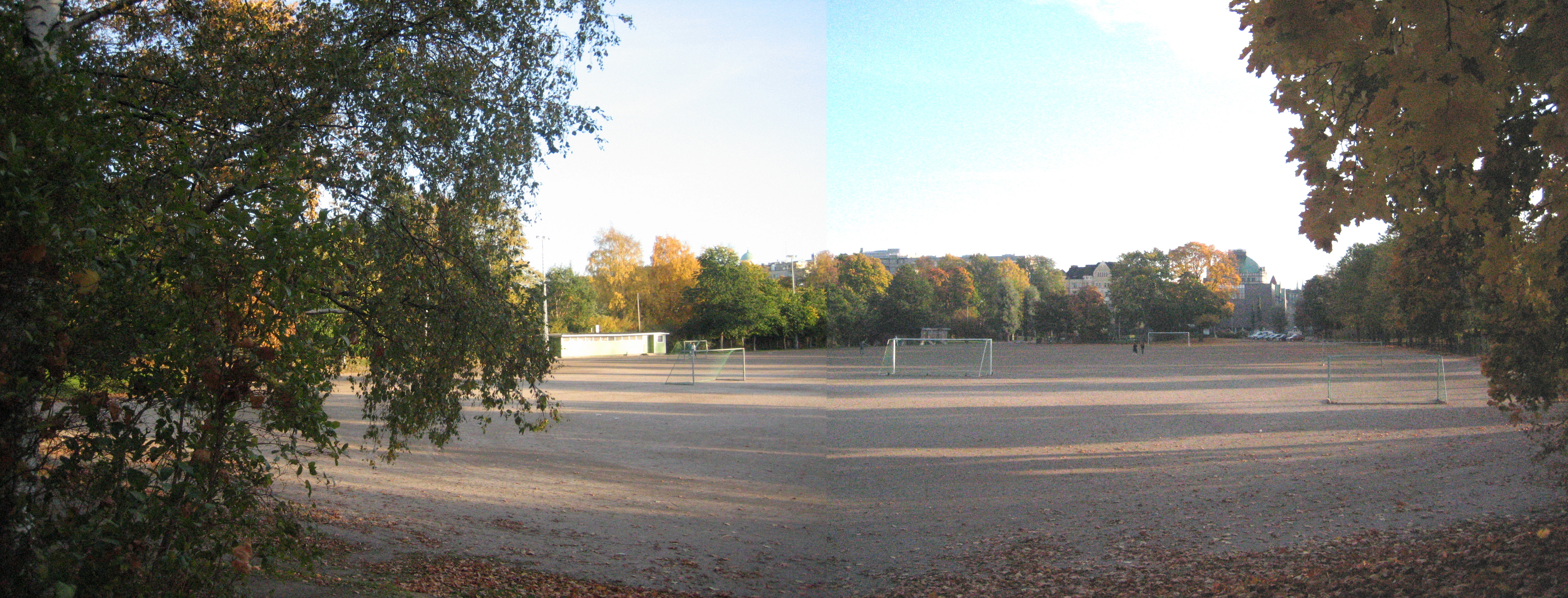
Sandfield, usually occupied by the soccer players

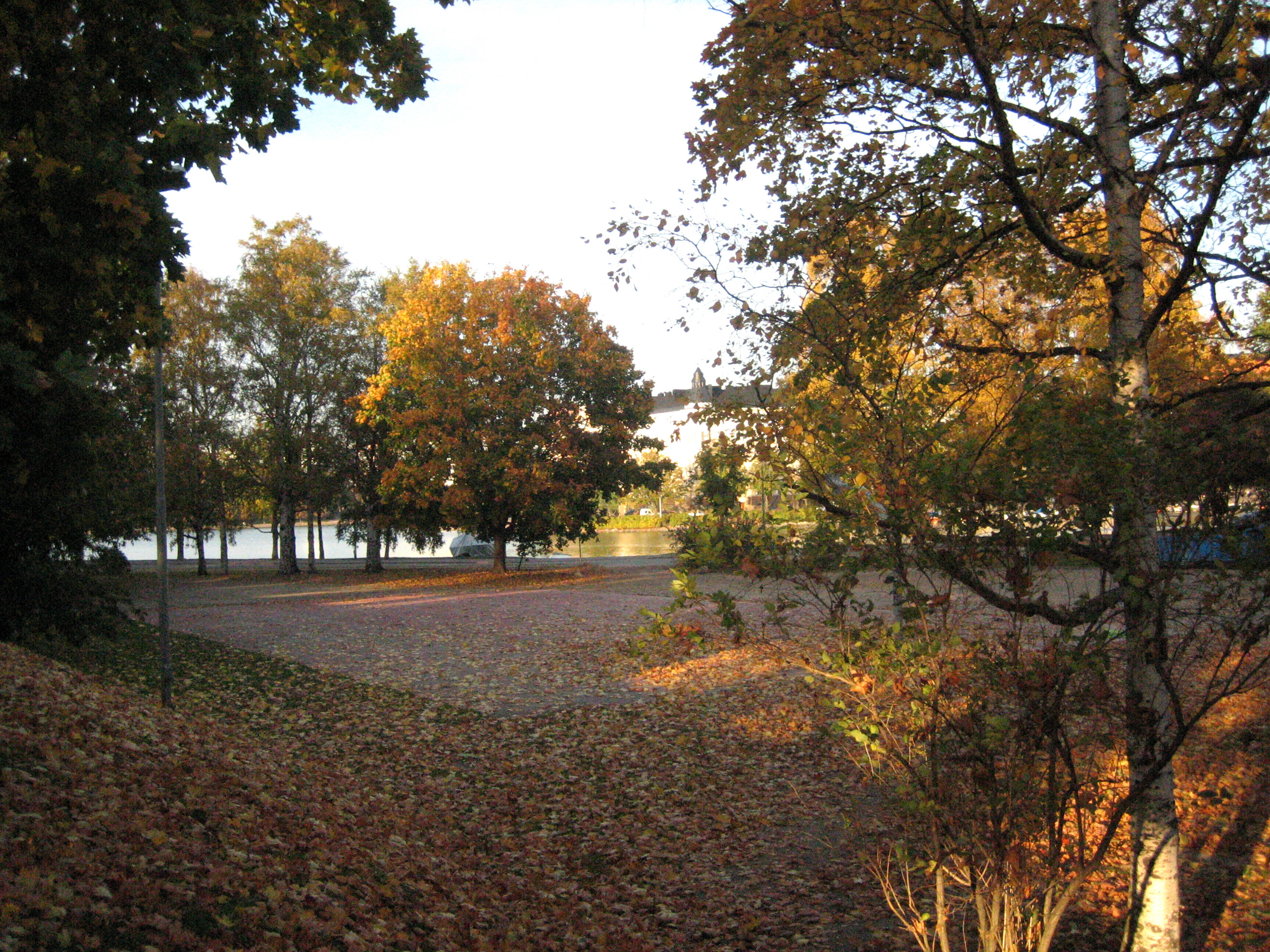
The basketball season is over

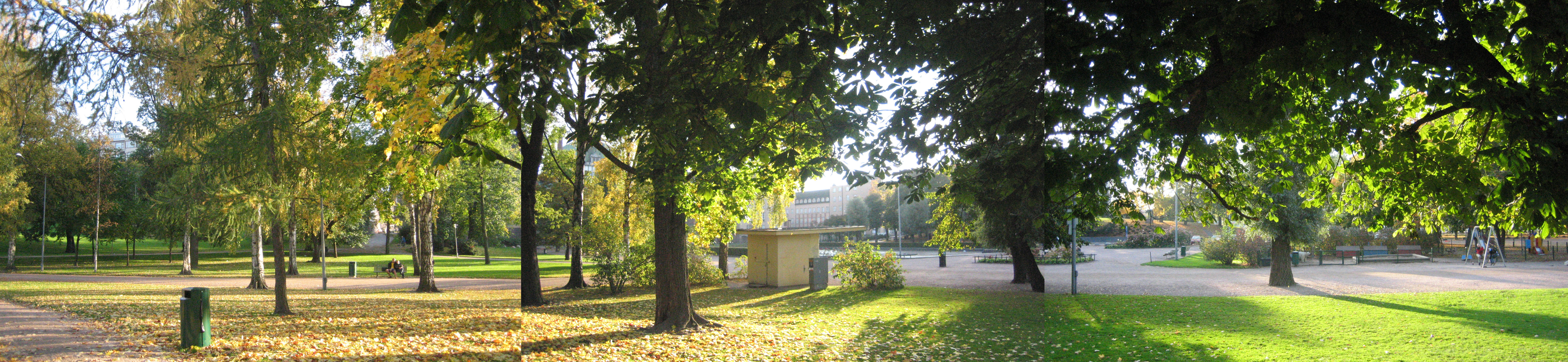
A panorama

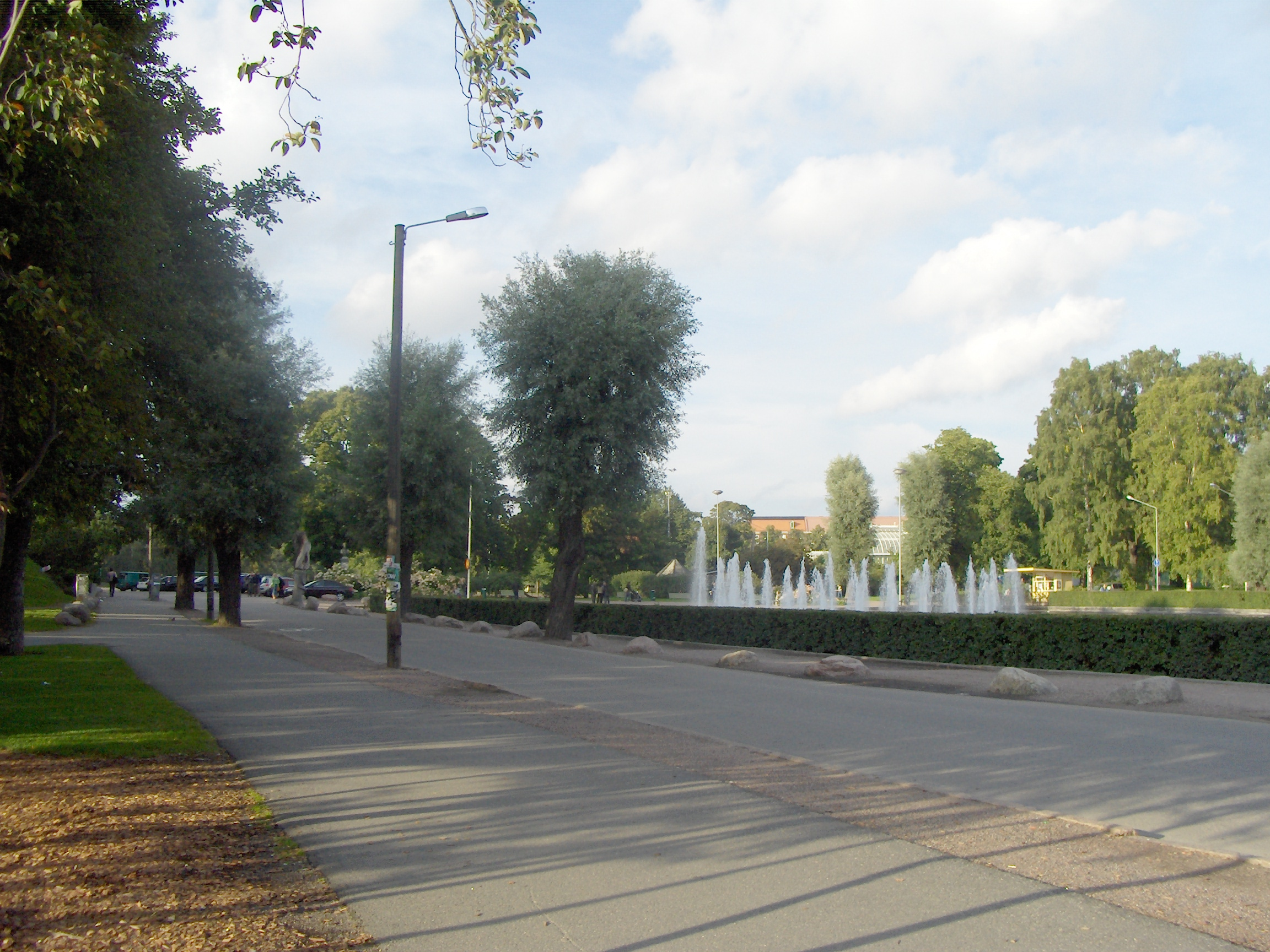
View from the pond
