= Cajsa Wahllund =

Finnish restaurateur (1771–1843)

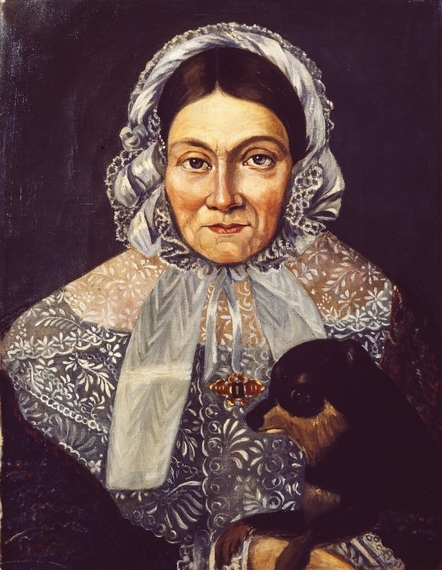
A portrait of Cajsa Wahllund.

Catharina Christina "Cajsa" Wahllund (1 May 1771, Värmland, Sweden – 13 July 1843, Helsinki) was a Swedish-born Finnish restaurateur.

Wahllund moved from Sweden to Finland in 1810. She was the successful owner of a popular inn and restaurant in Turku (Åbo) in 1812–1819 and in Helsinki (Helsingfors) in 1819–1843. She has been regarded as having introduced restaurants to Finland. She was a successful and popular businesswoman, and was especially popular among students: her restaurant became a known center of students.

== Legacy ==
The Kaisaniemi Park was named after her.
