= Freemason's Grave =

Tomb and memorial in Helsinki, Finland

Coordinates: 60°10′32″N 24°56′39″E

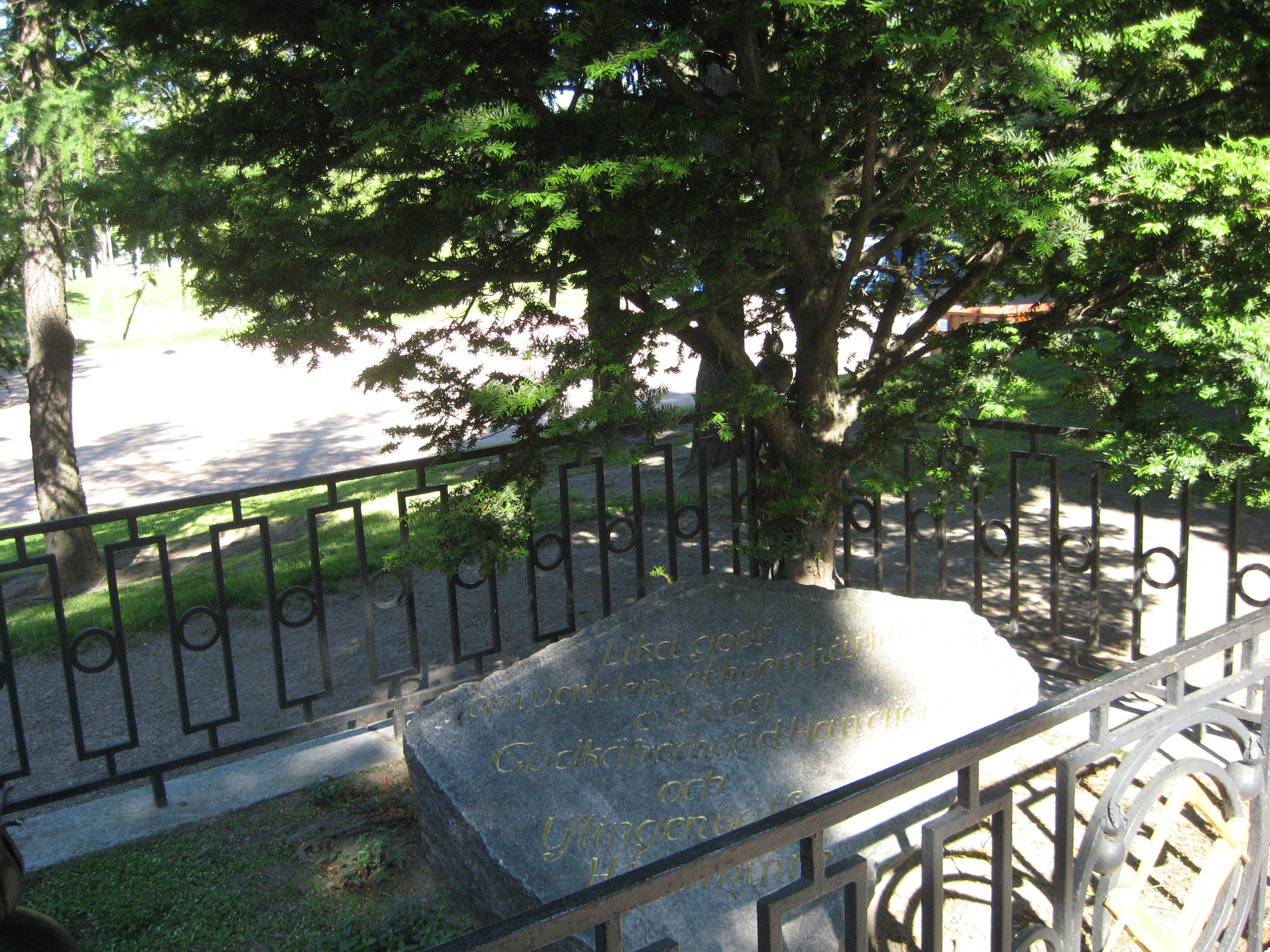
Freemason's Grave in Kaisaniemi

The Freemason's Grave is a grave monument on a grassy knoll northwest of the Kaisaniemi Botanical Gardens in Helsinki, Finland. It commemorates Fredrik Granatenhjelm, an artillery officer from the Sveaborg Fortress (now Suomenlinna), who later moved to the mainland Helsinki, gaining great repute as a philanthropist.

== Granatenhjelm ==
A Swedish Royal Knight; a veteran of the Seven Years' War and the War of the Caps, Fredrik Granatenhjelm (May 1, 1708 – December 13, 1784), is buried in the grave. Despite the monument's name, possibly derived from its square and compasses decorations, it is not known whether Granatenhjelm himself was a member of the Freemasons. Some historians have been led to assume it, perhaps out of weight from the popular designation of the monument. It is known for certain that he was posthumously made an honorary member of the quasi-masonic Walhalla-orden.

== Location outside church grounds ==
The spot was chosen as it was the location where the officer habitually rested on his daily constitutionals, then within Edboms decorative garden, and where he had expressed a wish to be buried. The Walhalla-orden took these wishes to King Gustaf III and gained permission to bury him outside church grounds, when he was examining the troops at Parola, during his visit to Finland. The order's members were also the ones who carried his casket into the ground.

The grave monument is exceptional within the city in that it is not within a church yard. At the site of Helsinki's first church, the gravestone of a single tradesman is all that has been retained to designate the spot, but Freemason's Grave differs in that it was intended to be a solitary grave from the start. Another similar case is the urn of poet Katri Vala which is set at a spot adjacent to her eponymous park in the Sörnäinen neighbourhood.

== Monument above the grave ==
Originally a statue was planned for the site, but when that plan failed, Lars Jägerhorm was able to get a commemorative stone and guardrails around it. The masonic symbols of that guardrail that have led to the popular designation of the monument as a "Freemason's grave". The unbeaten stone face bears the freehand style inscription: "Lika godt om verlden vet hvem här hvilar alt nog Gud käner hvad Han gjort och Uslingen välsignar HANS minne." ("As little as the world cares who lies here, God will nevertheless know his deeds and the wretched bless HIS memory.")

An evergreen conifer is planted next to the stone, and an ironwork guardrail with masonic square and compass are featured within the rails; this decoration and the inscription on the stone is kept painted with gold. The emblems of field artillery, incendiary grenades, are set as knobs to top the posts at the corners of the ironworks; palpably also a play of words on his family name "Granatenhjelm".
