= University of Helsinki Botanical Garden =

Botanical garden in Helsinki, Finland

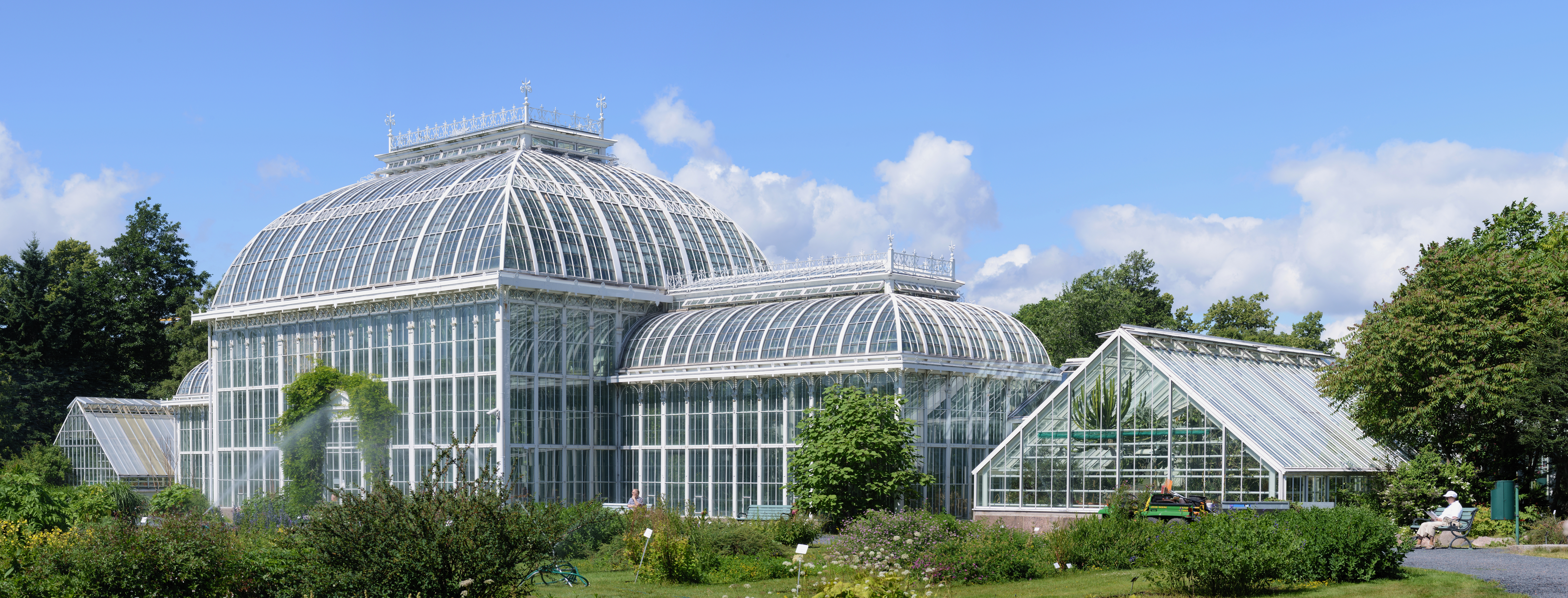
- The Palm House, built in 1889
- Interactive map of University of Helsinki Botanical Garden
- Location: Helsinki, Finland
- Coordinates: 60°10′20″N 24°56′51″E

The University of Helsinki Botanical Garden is an institution subordinate to the Finnish Museum of Natural History of the University of Helsinki, which maintains a collection of live plants for use in research and teaching. The Botanical Garden has two separate sites: one in Kaisaniemi and one in Kumpula.

The Kaisaniemi Garden is open to the public. Its greenhouse is currently home to more than 800 different species of plants and its grounds to more than 2,800 plants of different origins.

Construction on the Kumpula Garden started in 1987 and opened to the public in 2009.

== History of the Kaisaniemi Garden ==
=== A walking area for the people of Helsinki ===
In 1763, Governor Hans Henrik Böje rented a plot of land from the city of Helsinki bordered by Hämeen maantie (nowadays Siltasaarenkatu) and started a garden on it. In 1773, control of the garden was handed over to gardener Erik Edbom. When Helsinki became the capital in 1812, the garden became a municipal garden. Later on, in 1827, work on transforming the garden into a walking area for the denizens of Helsinki commenced according to plans drawn up by Carl Ludvig Engel. His plans divided the park into two distinct areas: a symmetrical, tree-lined park and a landscaped garden formed by winding paths. In 1829, the walking area was pared back once the Imperial Academy of Turku Botanical Garden moved next to it after the Great Fire hit Turku and the Imperial Academy relocated to Helsinki.

=== History of the Botanical Garden ===
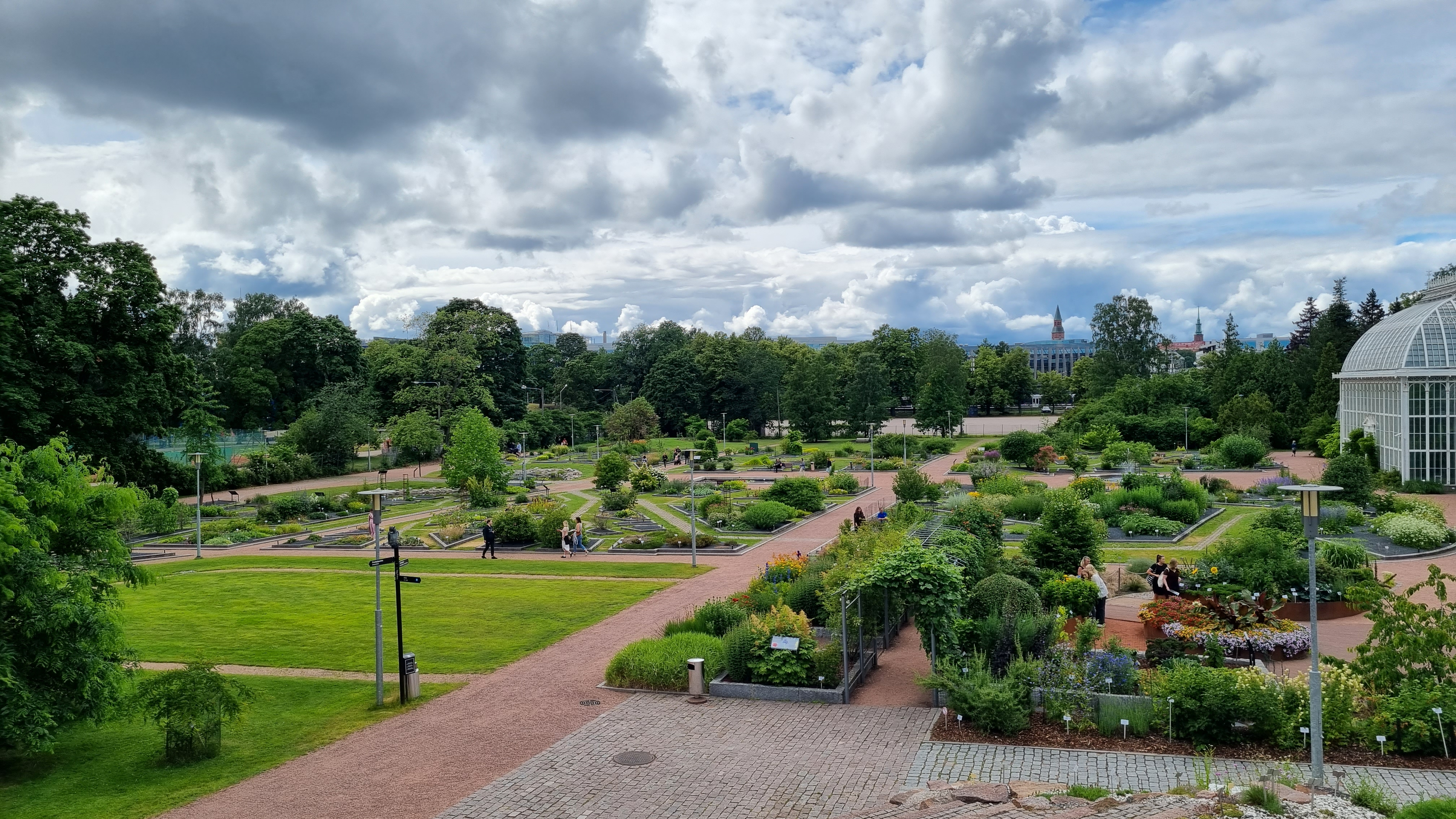
The Kaisaniemi Garden

The University of Helsinki Botanical Garden has its roots in the Imperial Academy of Turku Botanical Garden, which was established by Professor Elias Tillandz in 1678. Tillandz' garden was a small garden for growing cabbages and medicinal plants. After Tillandz' death, the garden was left to its own demise until Professor Pehr Kalm took responsibility for it. The garden started to flourish as Kalm brought hundreds of useful plants with him from North America. When the Imperial Academy of Turku relocated to Helsinki in 1828, it was allocated a piece of land in Kaisaniemi that had previously served as common pasture for the people of Helsinki. Professor of Zoology and Botany Carl Reinhold Sahlberg started construction on a new garden, relying on his extensive private collection that was not destroyed in the Great Fire of Turku. Head Gardener Franz Faldermann of the Saint Petersburg Botanical Garden was commissioned to design the botanical garden. According to his plan, the garden had two separate areas: gardens and a park-like arboretum. He also planned the greenhouse buildings, of which the first was completed in 1832. Sahlberg served as the first head and organizer of the botanical garden, whose ambitious goal was to create collections of all of the plants in Finland and as many of the non-Finnish plants that thrived in Finland.

The wooden, single-storey main building designed by Engel was built in the middle of the garden by 1831. In the 1850s, it was expanded according to plans by Jean Wik. The wood building was moved out of the way of the new main building. In its new location, it became the gardeners' living quarters, which is the purpose it still serves today. Wiik planned an Empire style bakehouse for the garden and a fence to protect the garden from the cows grazing in pasture nearby. Engel also planned a joint Gothic stable and cow barn, which has already been demolished.

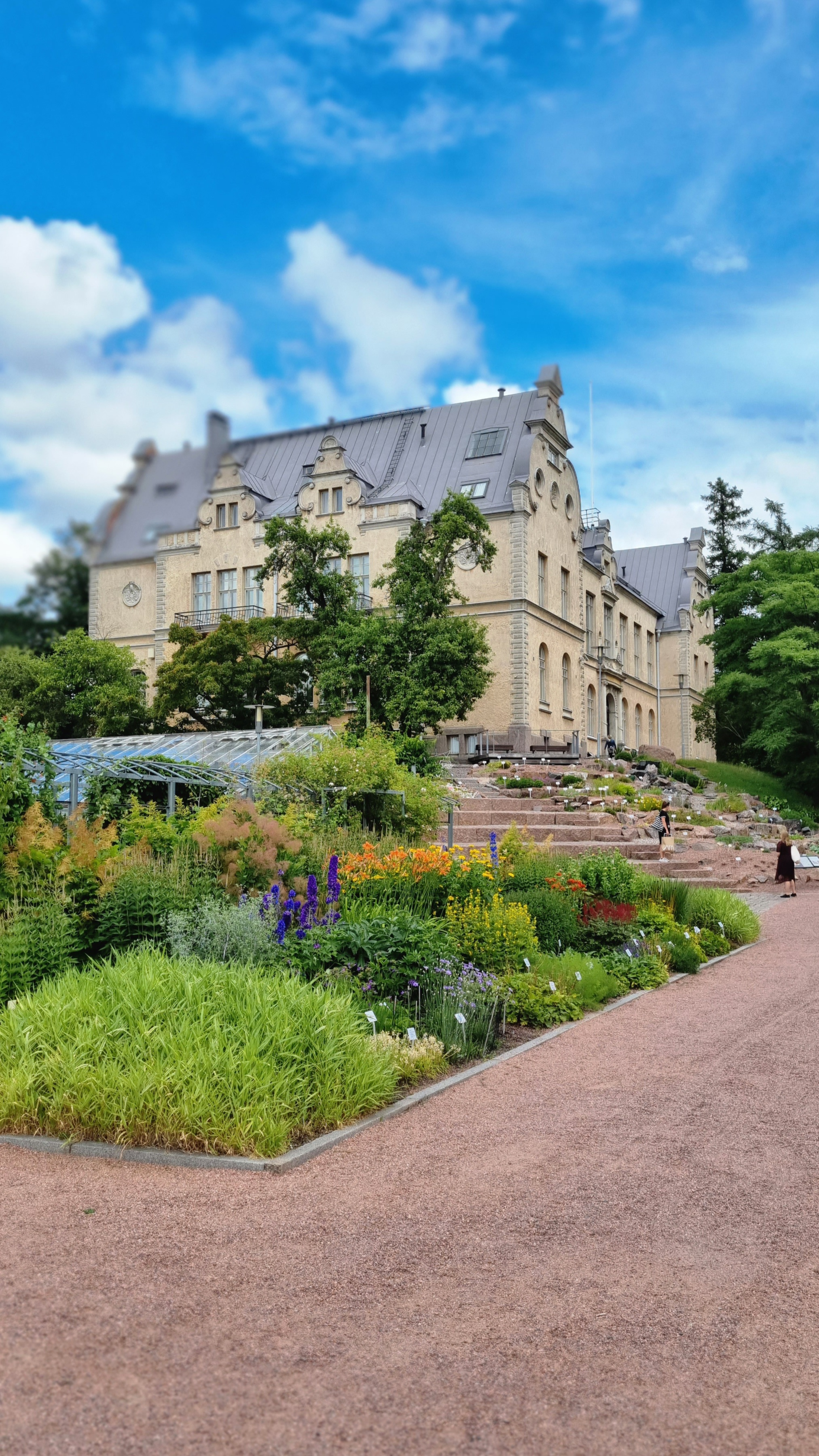
The Botanical Museum, built in 1903

The botanical garden's current buildings are the handiwork of Architect Gustaf Nyström, as the original greenhouses designed by Faldermann were replaced at the end of the 19th century with new greenhouses designed by Nyström. Unlike Faldermann's greenhouses, Nyström's were made of wrought iron. In 1889, the large, tropical Palm House with its glass roof was finished and in 1896 the rest of the greenhouses. In 1903, construction on the institute building housing the Botanical Department and the Botanical Museum that Nyström had designed to replace the original main building now serving as the gardeners' living quarters and the professor's living quarters was finished. The Botanical Museum is still housed in the same building. The gardeners' building was relocated to the western border of the botanical garden. Furthermore, wooden buildings from the 19th century were moved to the northern border of the garden from elsewhere in Helsinki during the 1990s.

During the Continuation War, the garden was hit by three bombs and the greenhouses were damaged. As a result, all of the more than 1,500 taxa in the greenhouses, with the exception of a single cypress and the seeds of a water-lily, died due to freezing temperatures. The seeds survived at the bottom of the water-lily pool and the current water-lily in the pool is the descendant of that water-lily.

In the 1950s, the greenhouses were restored and modernized and from 1996 to 1998, they were refurbished once again. The Kaisaniemi Garden and its greenhouses will continue to be used for exhibitions and research.

=== Gallery ===
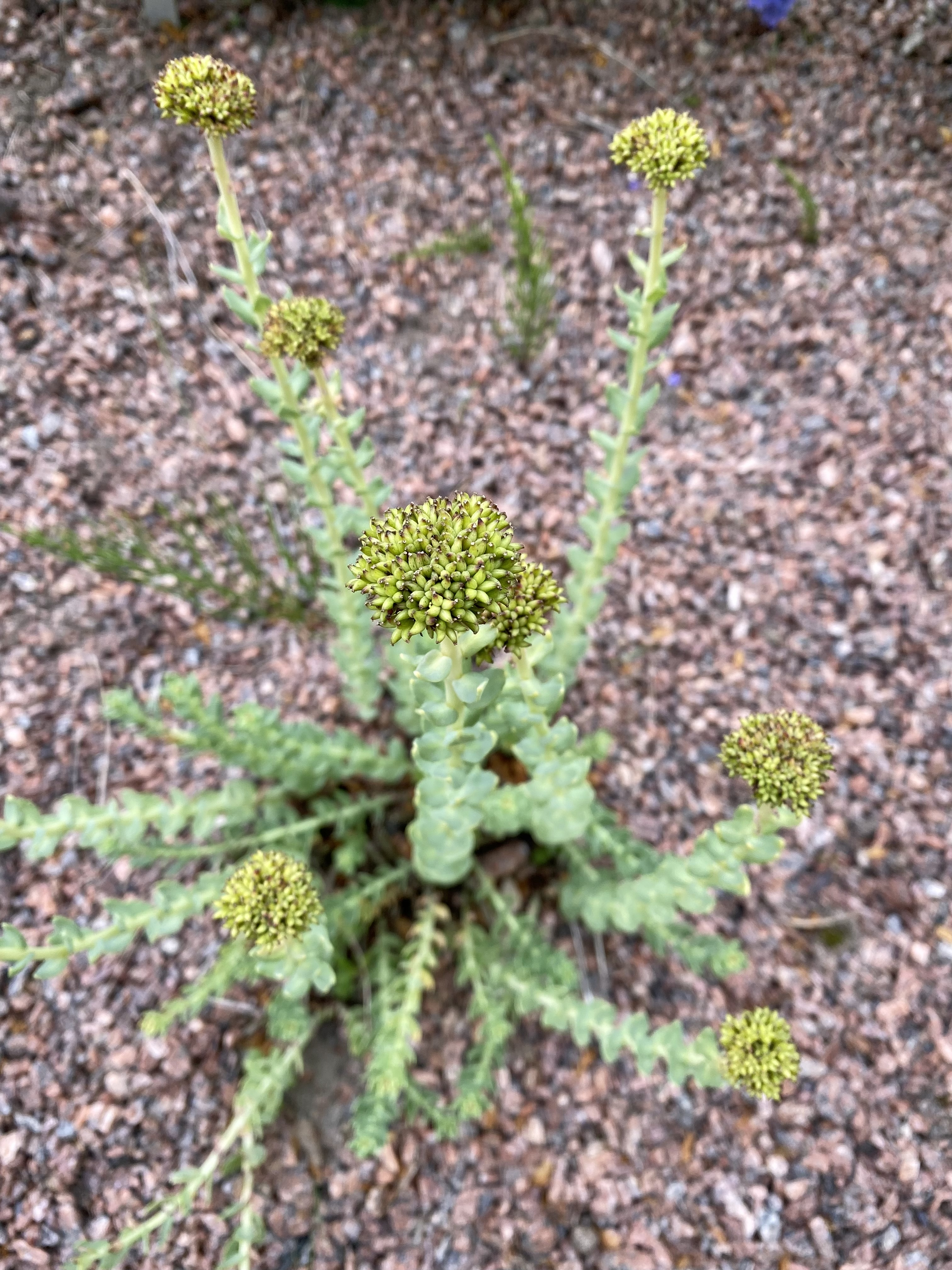

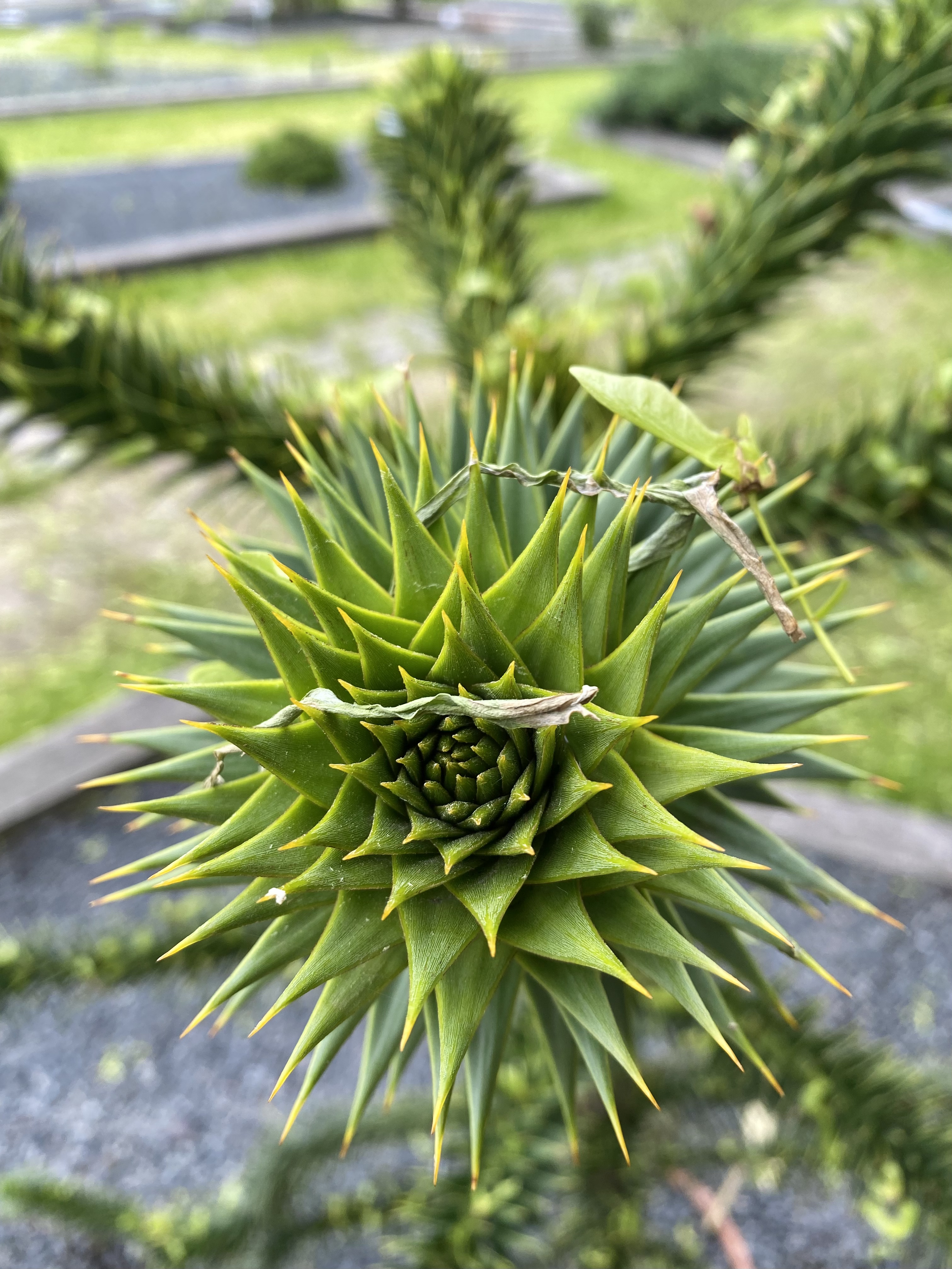

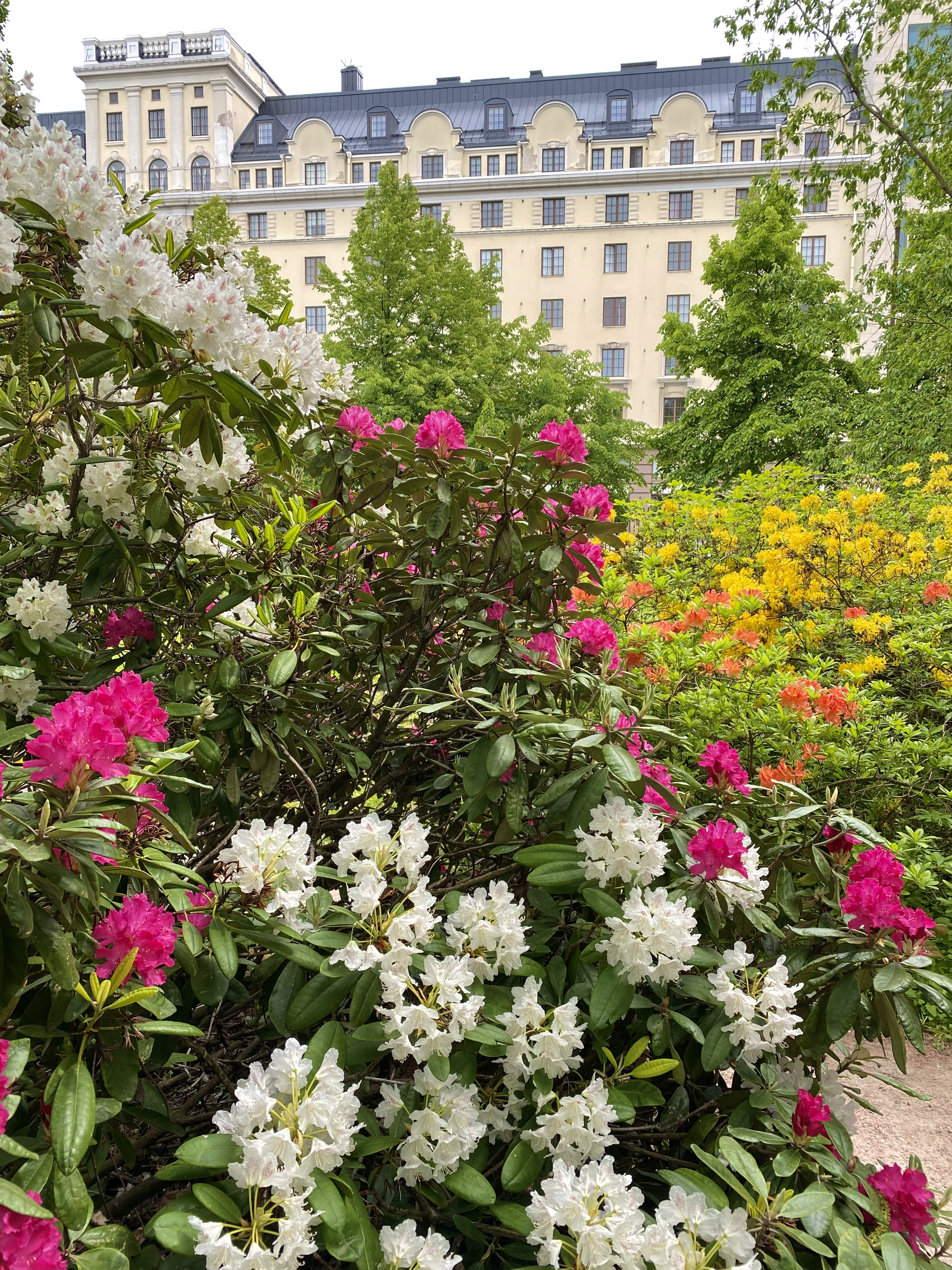

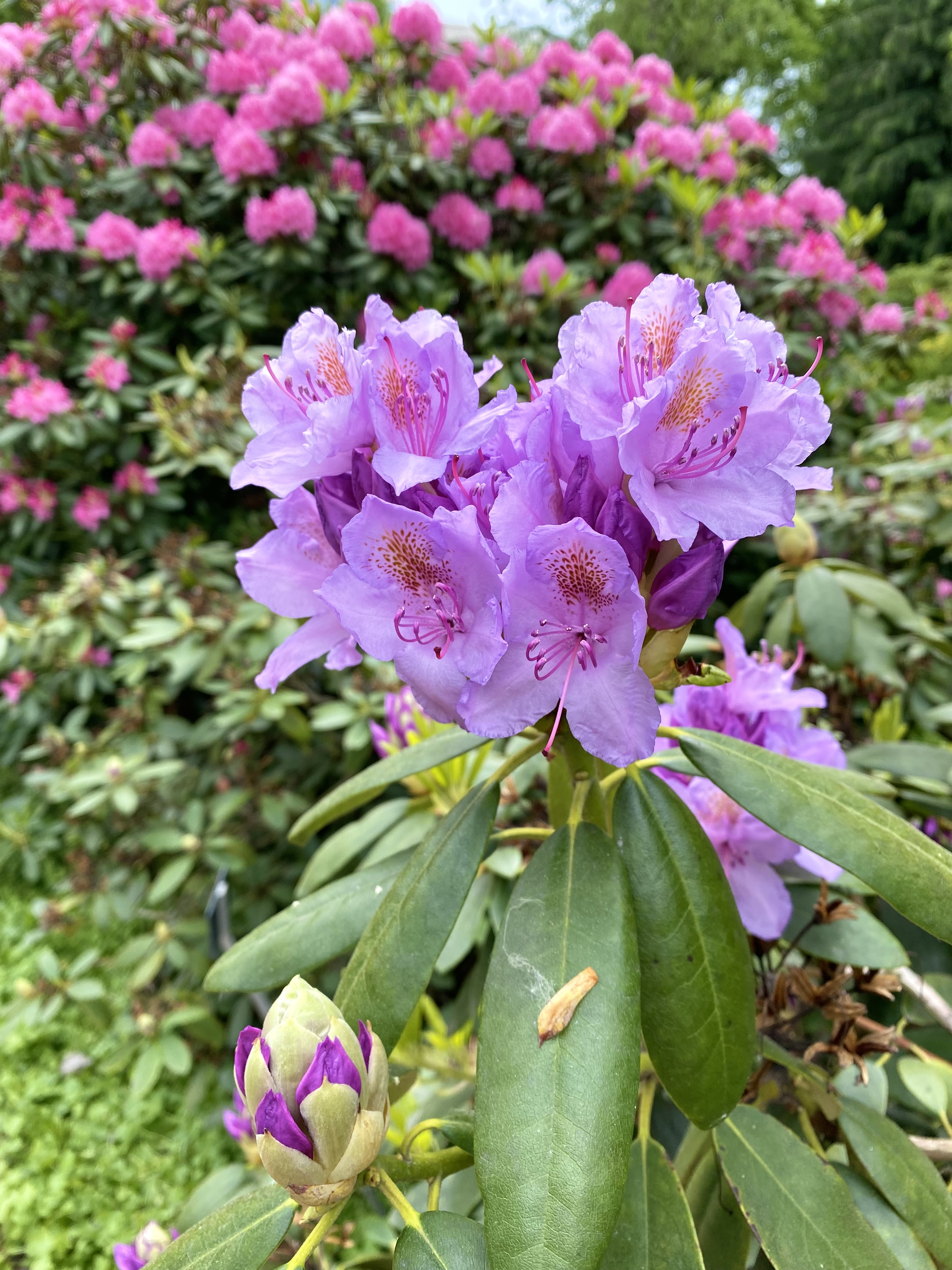

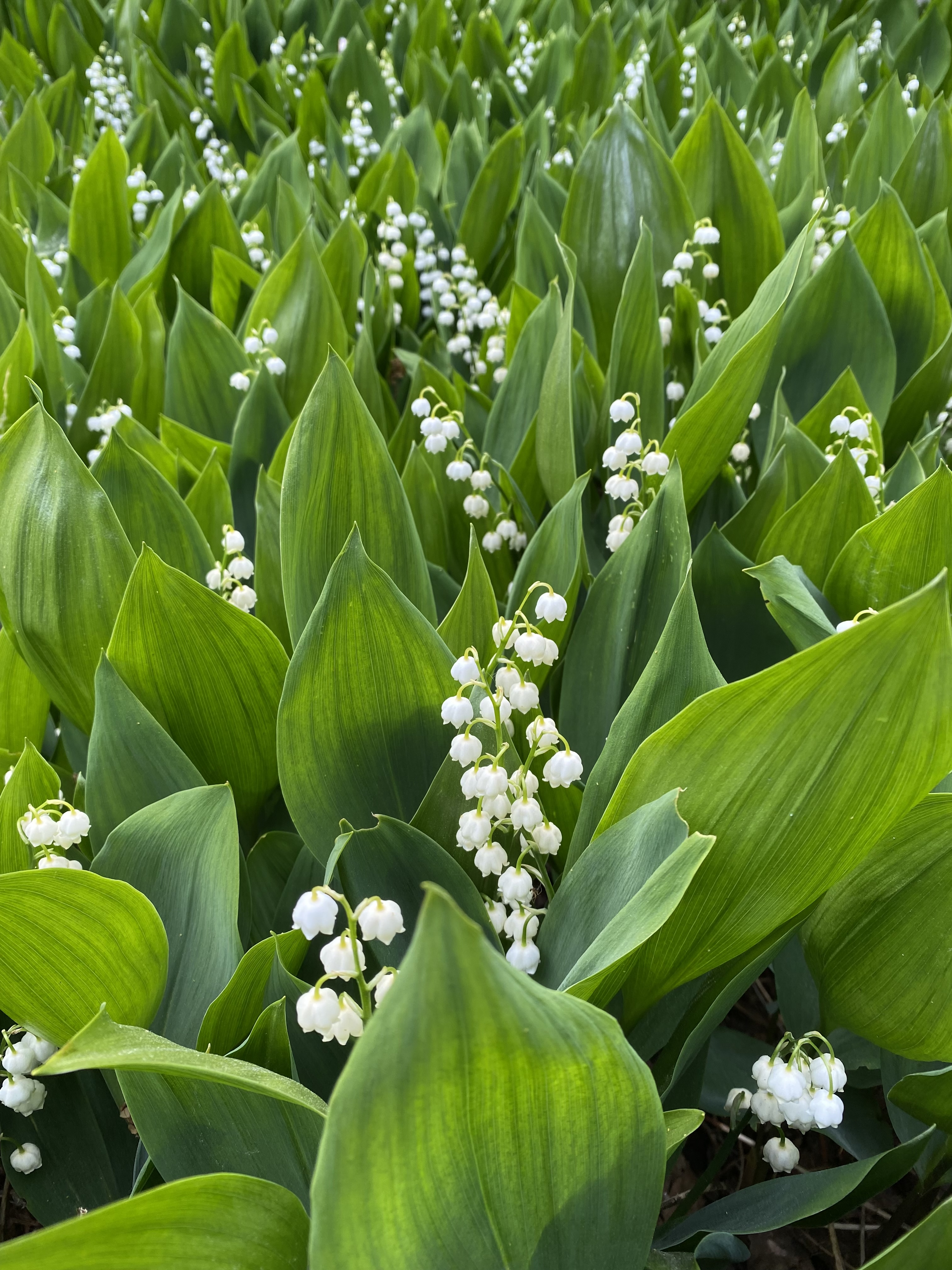

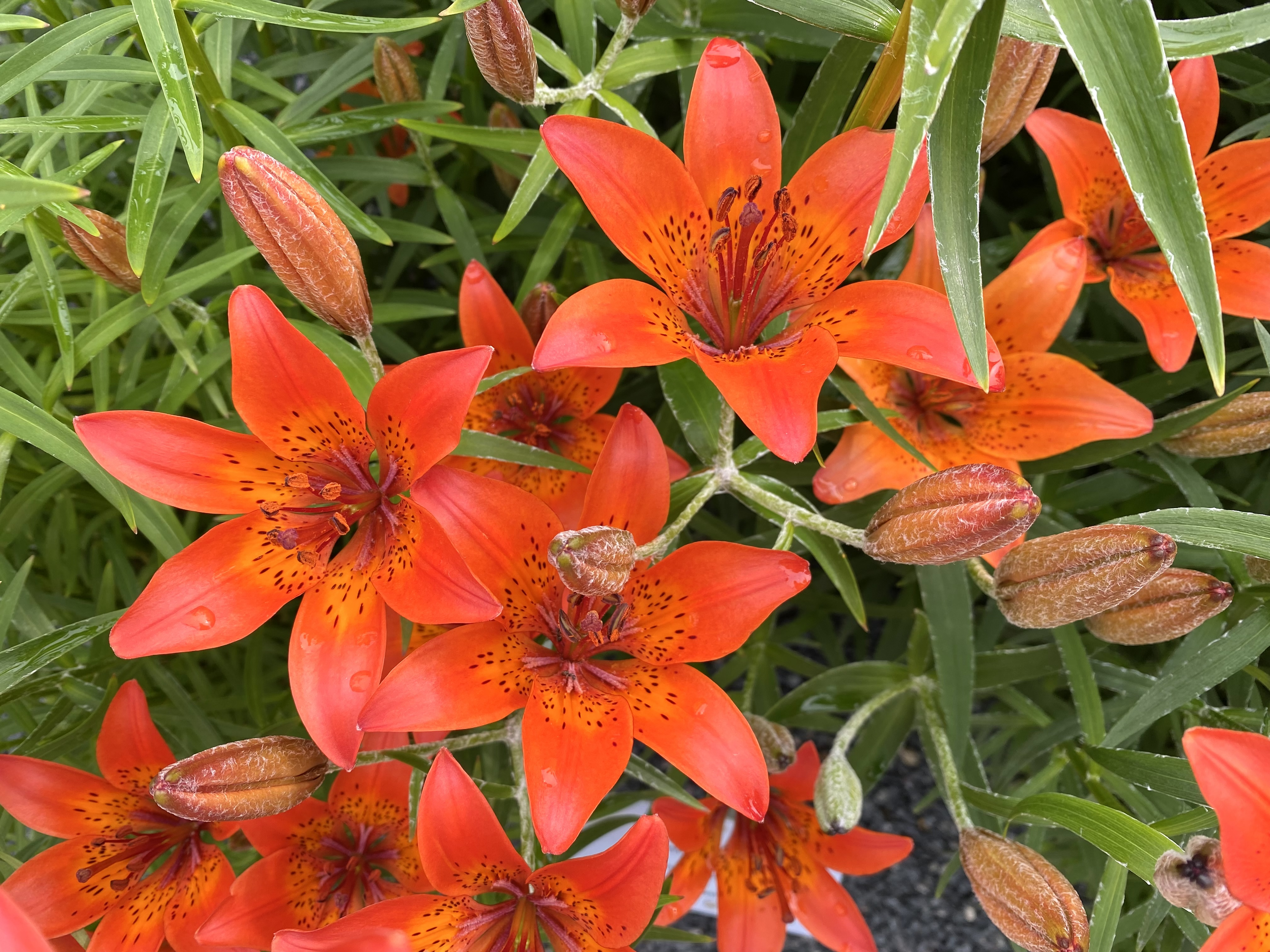

== History of the Kumpula Garden ==
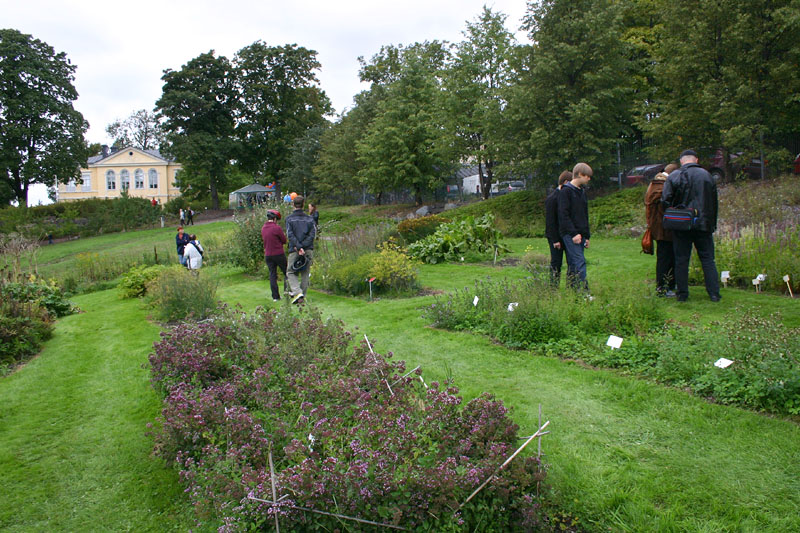
The useful plant section of the Kumpula Garden on September 9, 2006

In the 20th century, the university's botanical garden started to run out of space, so when the decision was made to split the university into four separate campus areas in the 1970s, a plot of land for a new botanical garden was set aside on the Kumpula Campus.

The boundaries of the Kumpula Garden were drawn in 1987. The new garden was built in the former garden of the Kumpula Manor. It opened to public in 2009. The garden is divided up into two separate sections: one for useful plants and one where the plants are arranged according to their geographical origin. The plants are gathered from areas that have climates similar to that of southern Finland, e.g., from Europe, North America and the Far East.
