= List of outdoor ice hockey games =

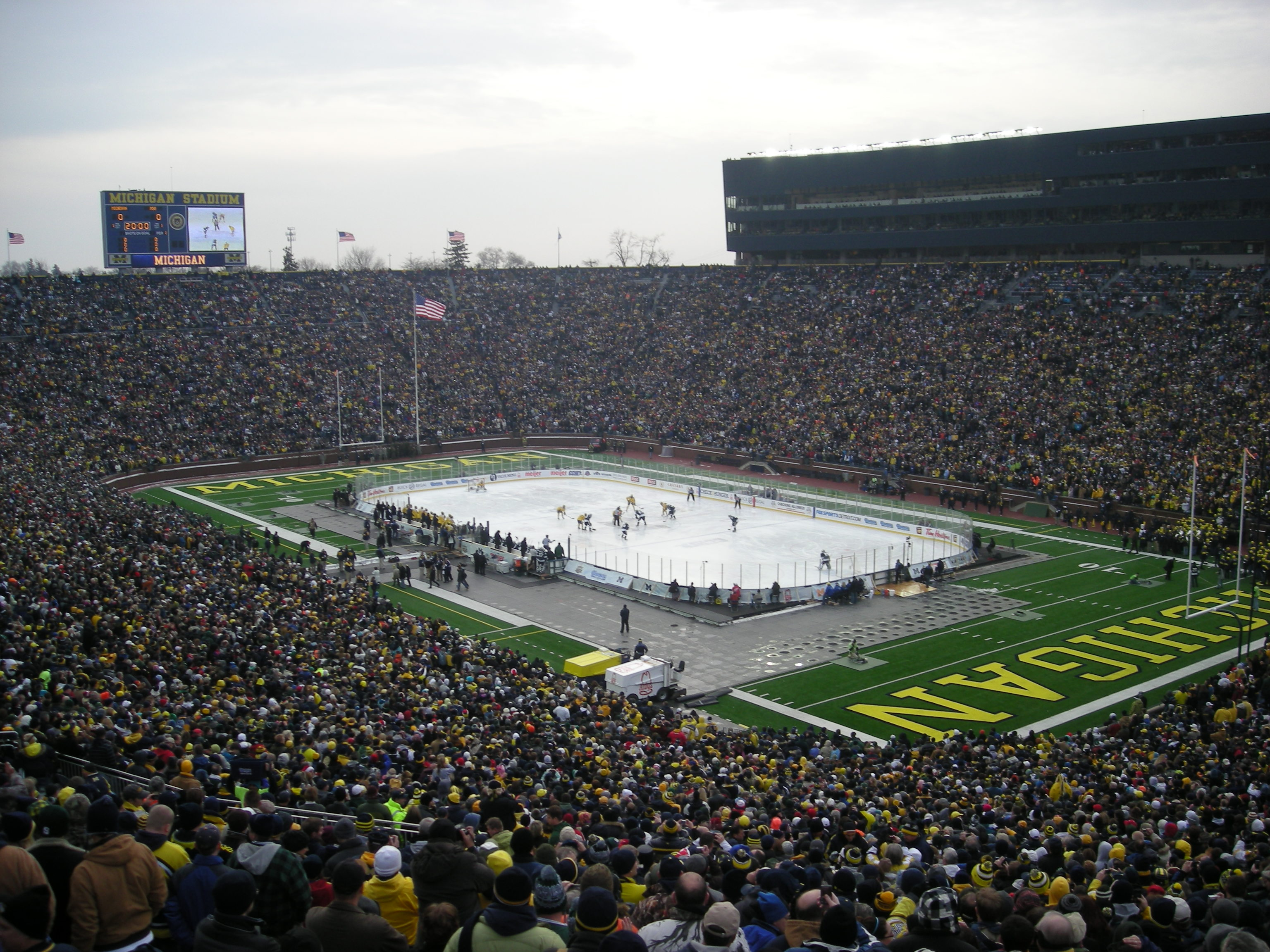
The University of Michigan and Michigan State set a world record for attendance on December 11, 2010, at Michigan Stadium in Ann Arbor.

Playing hockey games outdoors—in soccer, football and baseball stadiums—is an increasingly popular trend for junior, college, professional and international competitions in the 21st century. The popularity of outdoor games has resulted in attendance records in several leagues, and the current world record total of 104,173 was set at The Big Chill at the Big House, a December 2010 National Collegiate Athletic Association game between the University of Michigan and Michigan State University.

While other indoor sports such as basketball have been able to use outdoor tennis courts and even aircraft carriers for outdoor games, this is rarely possible in ice hockey because a regulation rink is generally much wider and longer than the playing surface available in either of those venues. Ice hockey, however, has been played at Stade Roland Garros, the venue of the French Open in tennis. Staging a Vysshaya liga game on the Russian aircraft carrier Admiral Kuznetsov has been considered as well. To compensate for the varying weather conditions at outdoor ice hockey games, the teams may switch sides after each half of a period.

== History ==
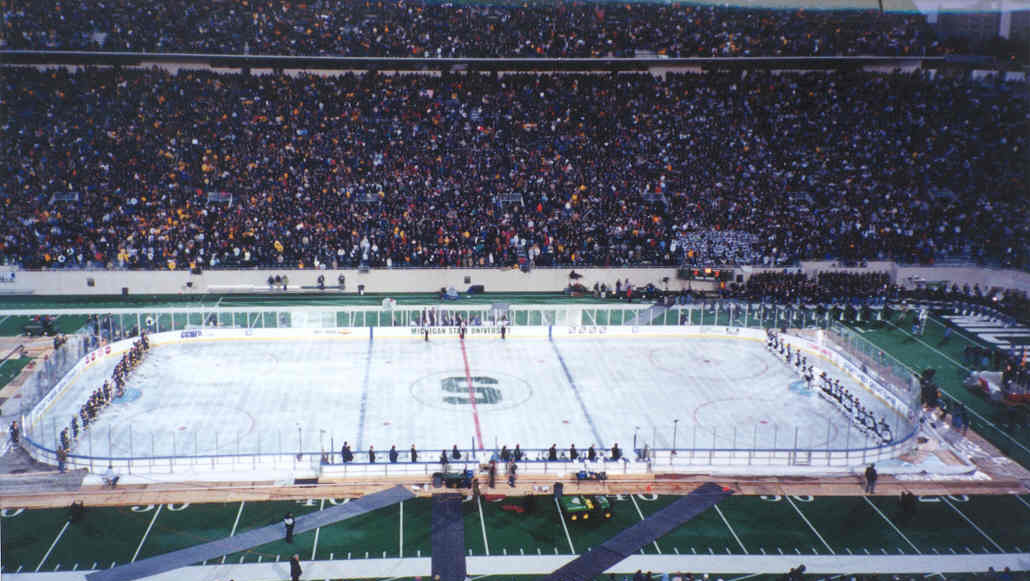
The University of Michigan and Michigan State's game, known as the Cold War, was first held in 2001 and launched the modern outdoor game phenomenon.

In the early history of hockey, games were played outdoors on rivers, lakes, and other naturally occurring ice surfaces. The first indoor game, held in 1875, was a novelty at the time, and after that the game moved inside. While the first Olympic hockey tournament, held in 1920, was played indoors, games at the first Winter Olympics in 1924 were the first of several such tournaments to be played outdoors. Games at the World Championships were occasionally played outdoors, including the final game in 1957 between the Soviet Union and Sweden at the Lenin Stadium in Moscow. The attendance at that game was approximately 55,000, a number that stood as a record for more than 40 years. In 1954, the Detroit Red Wings of the National Hockey League (NHL) played an exhibition game on an outdoor ice surface against the inmates of Michigan's Marquette Branch Prison.

While the New York Rangers and the Los Angeles Kings played an NHL exhibition game in 1991 outside Caesars Palace in Las Vegas, the modern trend for outdoor competition began in 2001. That year, Michigan State University and the University of Michigan played to a 3–3 tie in an outdoor game known as the Cold War before 74,554 fans. The game was held at Michigan State's Spartan Stadium, with the hockey rink set up in the middle of the football field.

The NHL's first regular season outdoor game ensued: the 2003 Heritage Classic, hosted by the Edmonton Oilers, who lost by a 4–3 score to the Montreal Canadiens. Though the game was played in frigid temperatures that went as low as −19 °C (−2 °F), it drew over 57,000 fans and was hailed as a success. The league followed it up in 2008 when it inaugurated the NHL Winter Classic as an annual event to be held on New Year's Day. The 2008 NHL Winter Classic, held in Buffalo, set an NHL attendance record of 71,217. The 2014 NHL Winter Classic, held at Michigan Stadium in Ann Arbor, Michigan, set a new NHL attendance record of 105,491. In 2011, for the first time the NHL hosted two outdoor games, the Winter Classic in Pittsburgh, and the Heritage Classic in Calgary.

Outdoor games have been held by many leagues around the world. The Swiss league's SCL Tigers hosted SC Bern in an outdoor game to celebrate the 100th Tigers–Bern Derby in 2007. In 2009, Swedish clubs Frölunda HC and Färjestads BK played a game at Ullevi. The game broke the former European league-game record for attendance at that time with a crowd of 31,144 (beaten in February 2011 when Jokerit and HIFK played in front of 36,644 spectators). The game also broke the Swedish record crowd of 23,192, set in the same stadium in 1962. The current world record for attendance at a hockey game was set in December 2010, in an NCAA game between the same two teams that participated in the Cold War. In this game, Michigan hosted Michigan State in an event known as The Big Chill at the Big House. The game had an announced attendance of 113,411 spectators, but Guinness World Records certified the attendance as 104,173 based on tickets scanned. The record had previously been set at the opening game of the 2010 IIHF World Championship, in which the hosting Germans defeated the United States 2–1 before a then-record 77,803 fans. Although the game was held at Veltins-Arena in Gelsenkirchen, it was not technically an outdoor game, as the stadium's retractable roof was closed due to International Ice Hockey Federation regulations. In 2010, Färjestad and Frölunda again played an outdoor game against each other, this time in Karlstad. 15,274 spectators saw Färjestad win the game 5–2.

== Popularity ==
Outdoor games have proven to be immensely popular with fans. For the 2003 Heritage Classic, the NHL received over 900,000 requests from all over the world for a chance to buy one of the 57,167 tickets available. CBC's Hockey Night in Canada telecast of the game drew 2.7 million viewers, a record for a regular season game for the half-century old television program. In the United States, the Winter Classics have been a ratings winner; 4.56 million people watched the 2011 Winter Classic, and the game led to a ratings win for NBC in the coveted 18–49 age group despite the fact that poor weather forced the NHL to move the start time of the game back several hours on less than a day's notice. It became the most watched NHL regular season game in the last 36 years. The games have been credited as causing increased interest in hockey in the United States. In Russia, the Kontinental Hockey League (KHL) hosted its first All-Star Game in 2009 in Moscow's Red Square. The league used the location to promote the KHL during the 2008 financial crisis.

== Games ==
Though games have been held outdoors since the sport's earliest days, this list contains only those held since the 2001 Cold War popularized the trend of holding outdoor games as events. This list also does not contain games held in domed or retractable roof stadiums that were closed during the game such as the Frozen Dome Classic held at the Carrier Dome in 2014.

Date	Event	Location	League	Home team	Score	Visiting team	Attendance	Notes	Ref
October 6, 2001	Cold War	(United States) Spartan Stadium; East Lansing, Michigan	NCAA Division I men's (CCHA)	Michigan State Spartans (men)	3–3	Michigan Wolverines (men)	74,554	First outdoor game in NCAA history; set a new ice hockey attendance world record (since broken); third-highest NCAA men's hockey attendance	
November 22, 2003	2003 Heritage Classic	(Canada) Commonwealth Stadium; Edmonton, Alberta	NHL	Edmonton Oilers	3–4	Montreal Canadiens	57,167	First regular season outdoor game in NHL history	
April 2, 2005	Our Game to Give	(Canada) Ivor Wynne Stadium; Hamilton, Ontario	Charity game	Team Gilmour	9–8	Team Staios	10,300	Held during 2004–05 NHL lockout	
February 13, 2006	Frozen Tundra Hockey Classic	(United States) Lambeau Field; Green Bay, Wisconsin	NCAA Division I men's (WCHA)	Wisconsin Badgers (men)	4–2	Ohio State Buckeyes (men)	40,890	ninth-highest attendance for NCAA men's hockey	
January 14, 2007	100th Tigers-Bern derby match	Stade de Suisse; Bern, Switzerland	NLA	SCL Tigers	2–5	SC Bern	30,076	National League A attendance record	
January 1, 2008	2008 NHL Winter Classic	(United States) Ralph Wilson Stadium; Orchard Park, New York	NHL	Buffalo Sabres	1–2 (SO)	Pittsburgh Penguins	71,217		
January 1, 2009	2009 NHL Winter Classic	(United States) Wrigley Field; Chicago, Illinois	NHL	Chicago Blackhawks	4–6	Detroit Red Wings	40,818		
January 10, 2009	2009 KHL All-Star Game	Red Square; Moscow, Russia	KHL	Team Yashin	6–7	Team Jágr	2,500 (est.)	First KHL outdoor game	
February 7, 2009		Gstaad Skating Rink; Gstaad, Switzerland	Exhibition	Switzerland (men's)	4–3 (SO)	Slovakia (men's)	3,000 (est.)		
February 14, 2009	Fairbanks Ice Dogs 1st Annual Outdoor Game	(United States) Big Dipper Ice Arena; Fairbanks, Alaska	NAHL	Fairbanks Ice Dogs	3–1	Alaska Avalanche	2,000 (est.)	First outdoor game sanctioned by USA Hockey	
December 27, 2009	2009 Hungarian Winter Classic	Kisstadion; Budapest, Hungary	MOL Liga	Ferencvárosi TC	2–1	Újpesti TE	4,500		
December 28, 2009	2009 SEL Outdoor Classic	Ullevi; Gothenburg, Sweden	SEL	Frölunda HC	4–1	Färjestad BK	31,144	Elitserien/SHL attendance record	
January 1, 2010	2010 NHL Winter Classic	(United States) Fenway Park; Boston, Massachusetts	NHL	Boston Bruins	2–1 (OT)	Philadelphia Flyers	38,112		
January 8, 2010	Frozen Fenway 2010	(United States) Fenway Park; Boston, Massachusetts	NCAA Division I women's (Hockey East)	Northeastern Huskies (women)	3–5	New Hampshire Wildcats (women)	6,889	set a (since surpassed) attendance record for NCAA Division I women's ice hockey	
January 8, 2010	Frozen Fenway 2010	(United States) Fenway Park; Boston, Massachusetts	NCAA Division I men's (Hockey East)	Boston College Eagles (men)	2–3	Boston University Terriers (men)	38,472	eighth-highest attendance for NCAA men's hockey	
January 9, 2010	2010 EBEL Winter Classic	Hypo-Arena; Klagenfurt, Austria	EBEL	EC KAC	1–3	VSV EC	30,500	Austrian Hockey League attendance record	
January 9, 2010	New Jersey Pond Hockey Classic	(United States) Navesink Country Club; Navesink, New Jersey	ACHA	Rowan University (men)	4–4	University of Maryland, Baltimore County (men)	100	First ACHA outdoor game	
January 29, 2010	Salata Open Air 2010	Salata-Arena; Zagreb, Croatia	EBEL	KHL Medveščak Zagreb	2-3 (SO)	VSV EC	4,600		
January 31, 2010	Salata Open Air 2010	Salata-Arena; Zagreb, Croatia	EBEL	KHL Medveščak Zagreb	4-3 (SO)	Vienna Capitals	4,600		
February 6, 2010	Camp Randall Hockey Classic	(United States) Camp Randall Stadium; Madison, Wisconsin	NCAA Division I women's (WCHA)	Wisconsin Badgers (women)	6–1	Bemidji State Beavers (women)	8,263	set a (since surpassed) attendance record for NCAA Division I women's ice hockey	
February 6, 2010	Camp Randall Hockey Classic	(United States) Camp Randall Stadium; Madison, Wisconsin	NCAA Division I men's (WCHA)	Wisconsin Badgers (men)	3–2	Michigan Wolverines (men)	55,031	fourth-highest attendance for an NCAA men's ice hockey game	
February 20, 2010	Mirabito Outdoor Classic	(United States) New York State Fairgrounds; Syracuse, New York	AHL	Syracuse Crunch	2–1	Binghamton Senators	21,508	First AHL outdoor game; AHL attendance record (since broken)	
March 13, 2010	Fairbanks Ice Dogs 2nd Annual Outdoor Game	(United States) Big Dipper Ice Arena; Fairbanks, Alaska	NAHL	Fairbanks Ice Dogs	3–2	Wichita Falls Wildcats	2,500 (est.)		
November 26, 2010	Northern Classic	(Canada) Fort McMurray, Alberta	AJHL	Fort McMurray Oil Barons	4–2	Drayton Valley Thunder	5,726	AJHL attendance record	
December 4, 2010	The Frozen Face-off	(United States) Michigan Stadium; Ann Arbor, Michigan	MCHA	Adrian Bulldogs (men)	3–0	Concordia Falcons (men)	1,470	First D-III outdoor game	
December 11, 2010	The Big Chill at the Big House	(United States) Michigan Stadium; Ann Arbor, Michigan	NCAA Division I men's (CCHA)	Michigan Wolverines (men)	5–0	Michigan State Spartans (men)	104,173	Attendance world record	
December 26, 2010	2010 SEL Outdoor Classic	Karlstad Outdoor Arena; Karlstad, Sweden	SEL	Färjestad BK	5–2	Frölunda HC	15,274		
December 31, 2010	2011 NHL Winter Classic Alumni Game	(United States) Heinz Field; Pittsburgh, Pennsylvania	NHL Alumni	Pittsburgh Penguins alumni	5–5	Washington Capitals alumni	10,000	(Note: Organizers of the 2011 NHL Winter Classic Alumni Game limited the number of tickets available to far fewer than could be accommodated or were desired, a move that caused controversy.)	
January 1, 2011	2011 NHL Winter Classic	(United States) Heinz Field; Pittsburgh, Pennsylvania	NHL	Pittsburgh Penguins	1–3	Washington Capitals	68,111		
January 2, 2011	Open Air Hockey 2011	Pardubice-Svítkov Speedway; Pardubice, Czech Republic	ELH	HC Eaton Pardubice	4–2	HC Kometa Brno	17,140	ELH attendance record (since broken)	
January 9, 2011	2011 World Junior Ice Hockey Championships – Division III	Zócalo; Mexico City, Mexico	IIHF WJHC	Mexico national junior team (men's)	8–0	Bulgaria national junior team (men's)	3,000	First outdoor ice hockey game in Mexico	
January 15, 2011	Rockstar Outdoor Hockey Classic	(United States) Avista Stadium; Spokane, Washington	CHL (WHL)	Spokane Chiefs	11–2	Kootenay Ice	7,075	First WHL and CHL regular season outdoor game	
January 15, 2011		(United States) Bernick's Outdoor Rink; Sartell, Minnesota	MIAC	Saint Benedict Blazers (women)	1–9	Concordia Cobbers (women)	100		
January 29, 2011	North Shore Winter Classic	(Canada) Iron Bridge Outdoor Arena; Iron Bridge, Ontario	GMHL	Elliot Lake Bobcats	8–2	Algoma Avalanche	400 (est.)		
February 5, 2011	2011 Talviklassikko	Helsinki Olympic Stadium; Helsinki, Finland	SM-liiga	Jokerit	3–4	HIFK	36,644	SM-liiga attendance record; attendance record for a European league match (since broken)	
February 13, 2011	Whalers Hockey Fest	(United States) Rentschler Field; East Hartford, Connecticut	NCAA Division I men's (Atlantic Hockey)	Connecticut Huskies (men)	3–1	Sacred Heart Pioneers (men)	1,911		
February 13, 2011	Whalers Hockey Fest	(United States) Rentschler Field; East Hartford, Connecticut	NCAA Division I women's (Hockey East)	Connecticut Huskies (women)	3–4	Providence Friars (women)	153		
February 15, 2011	Whalers Hockey Fest	(United States) Rentschler Field; East Hartford, Connecticut	NCAA Division III women's (NESCAC)	Trinity Bantams (women)	5–1	Wesleyan Cardinals (women)	100		
February 15, 2011	Whalers Hockey Fest	(United States) Rentschler Field; East Hartford, Connecticut	NCAA Division III men's (NESCAC)	Wesleyan Cardinals (men)	1–3	Trinity Bantams (men)	820		
February 19, 2011	Whalers Hockey Fest	(United States) Rentschler Field; East Hartford, Connecticut	NCAA Division I men's (Atlantic Hockey)	American International Yellow Jackets (men)	1–4	Army Black Knights (men)	1,142		
February 19, 2011	Whalers Hockey Fest	(United States) Rentschler Field; East Hartford, Connecticut	NHL Alumni	Hartford Whalers alumni	4–4	Boston Bruins alumni	10,000		
February 19, 2011	Whale Bowl	(United States) Rentschler Field; East Hartford, Connecticut	AHL	Connecticut Whale	4–5 (SO)	Providence Bruins	21,673	AHL attendance record (since broken)	
February 19, 2011	Face-Off in the Foothills	(Canada) McMahon Stadium; Calgary, Alberta	NHL Alumni	1989 Calgary Flames	3–5	Montreal Canadiens alumni	10,000+		
February 20, 2011	2011 Heritage Classic	(Canada) McMahon Stadium; Calgary, Alberta	NHL	Calgary Flames	4–0	Montreal Canadiens	41,022		
February 21, 2011	Face-Off in the Foothills	(Canada) McMahon Stadium; Calgary, Alberta	CHL (WHL)	Calgary Hitmen	2–3	Regina Pats	20,888	WHL and CHL attendance records; junior hockey attendance record (since broken)	
February 26, 2011	Slaget om Siljan	Villa Långbers Arena; Leksand, Sweden	HockeyAllsvenskan	Leksands IF	1–4	Mora IK	17,319		
March 12, 2011	Fairbanks Ice Dogs 3rd Annual Outdoor Game	(United States) Big Dipper Ice Arena; Fairbanks, Alaska	NAHL	Fairbanks Ice Dogs	5–3	Wenatchee Wild	2,000 (est.)		
December 10, 2011	2011 SEL Outdoor Classic	Elmia Outdoor Arena; Jönköping, Sweden	SEL	HV71	0–1 (OT)	Linköpings HC	18,884	Attendance record for a sports event in Jönköping	
December 31, 2011	2012 NHL Winter Classic Alumni Game	(United States) Citizens Bank Park; Philadelphia, Pennsylvania	NHL Alumni	Philadelphia Flyers alumni	3–1	New York Rangers alumni	45,808		
January 2, 2012	2012 NHL Winter Classic	(United States) Citizens Bank Park; Philadelphia, Pennsylvania	NHL	Philadelphia Flyers	2–3	New York Rangers	46,967		
January 6, 2012	2012 AHL Outdoor Game	(United States) Citizens Bank Park; Philadelphia, Pennsylvania	AHL	Adirondack Phantoms	4–3 (OT)	Hershey Bears	45,653	AHL attendance record	
January 7, 2012	Frozen Fenway 2012	(United States) Fenway Park; Boston, Massachusetts	NCAA Division I men's (Hockey East )	Vermont Catamounts (men)	2–3 (OT)	UMass Minutemen (men)	38,456	tenth-highest attendance for NCAA men's hockey	
January 7, 2012	Frozen Fenway 2012	(United States) Fenway Park; Boston, Massachusetts	NCAA Division I men's (Hockey East )	New Hampshire Wildcats (men)	4–5 (OT)	Maine Black Bears (men)	38,456	tenth-highest attendance for NCAA men's hockey	
January 10, 2012	Frozen Fenway 2012	(United States) Fenway Park; Boston, Massachusetts	NCAA Division I women's (Hockey East)	Providence Friars (women)	2–3	Dartmouth Big Green (women)	1,305		
January 13, 2012	Frozen Fenway 2012	(United States) Fenway Park; Boston, Massachusetts	NCAA Division III men's (ECAC East)	Babson Beavers (men)	1–4	Norwich Cadets (men)	7,250		
January 13, 2012	Frozen Fenway 2012	(United States) Fenway Park; Boston, Massachusetts	NCAA Division I men's (ECAC Hockey)	Harvard Crimson (men)	0–2	Union Dutchmen (men)	8,981		
January 14, 2012	Frozen Fenway 2012	(United States) Fenway Park; Boston, Massachusetts	NCAA Division I men's (Hockey East)	Boston College Eagles (men)	2–1	Northeastern Huskies (men)	29,601		
January 15, 2012	The Frozen Diamond Faceoff	(United States) Progressive Field; Cleveland, Ohio	NCAA Division I men's (CCHA)	Ohio State Buckeyes (men)	1–4	Michigan Wolverines (men)	25,864	First outdoor hockey game between rivals Ohio State and Michigan	
January 19, 2012	OUA Outdoor Classic	(Canada) Ivor Wynne Stadium; Hamilton, Ontario	OUA	UOIT Ridgebacks (women)	2–3	Brock Badgers (women)	102		
January 20, 2012	2012 AHL Outdoor Classic "Steeltown Showdown"	(Canada) Ivor Wynne Stadium; Hamilton, Ontario	NHL Alumni	Montreal Canadiens alumni	5–6	Toronto Maple Leafs alumni	8,000		
January 21, 2012	2012 AHL Outdoor Classic "Steeltown Showdown"	(Canada) Ivor Wynne Stadium; Hamilton, Ontario	AHL	Hamilton Bulldogs	2–7	Toronto Marlies	20,565		
January 22, 2012	OUA Outdoor Classic	(Canada) Ivor Wynne Stadium; Hamilton, Ontario	OUA	Waterloo Warriors (men)	3–1	Brock Badgers (men)	500		
February 3, 2012	Salata Open Air 2012	Salata-Arena; Zagreb, Croatia	EBEL	KHL Medveščak Zagreb	3-1	HDD Olimpija Ljubljana	4,500		
February 4, 2012	2012 Talviklassikko	Helsinki Olympic Stadium; Helsinki, Finland	SM-liiga	HIFK	3–2 (SO)	Jokerit	34,264		
February 5, 2012	Salata Open Air 2012	Salata-Arena; Zagreb, Croatia	EBEL	KHL Medveščak Zagreb	3-0	EC-KAC	4,500		
February 9, 2012	2012 Oddset Hockey Games	Helsinki Olympic Stadium; Helsinki, Finland	Euro Hockey Tour	Finland (men)	0–2	Russia (men)	25,036		
February 17, 2012	Russian Classic	Central Stadium; Krasnoyarsk, Russia	VHL	Sokol Krasnoyarsk	2–3	Lokomotiv Yaroslavl	16,100	First VHL outdoor game	
September 14, 2012	2012 Arena Ice Fever	Pula Arena; Pula, Croatia	EBEL	Medveščak Zagreb	2–3	Olimpija Ljubljana	7,022	First hockey game held in an amphitheater	
September 16, 2012	2012 Arena Ice Fever	Pula Arena; Pula, Croatia	EBEL	Medveščak Zagreb	4–1	Vienna Capitals	7,130		
December 8, 2012	2012 SEL Outdoor Classic/Brynäs IF 100-year celebration	Gävlebocken Arena; Gävle, Sweden	SEL	Brynäs IF	3–0	Timrå IK	15,009		
January 4, 2013	Bežigrad IceFest 2013	Bežigrad Stadium; Ljubljana, Slovenia	EBEL	Olimpija Ljubljana	5–4 (OT)	EC VSV	7,000		
January 5, 2013	2013 DEL Winter Game	Stadion Nürnberg; Nürnberg, Germany	DEL	Thomas Sabo Ice Tigers	4–3	Eisbären Berlin	50,000	First DEL outdoor game; attendance record for a European league match (since broken)	
January 6, 2013	City Game	(United States) Penguins Pond at Highmark Stadium; Pittsburgh, Pennsylvania	ACHA	Pitt Panthers (men)	5–3	Duquesne Dukes (men)	N/A	Game traditionally held at CONSOL Energy Center; held during the 2012–13 NHL lockout	
January 6, 2013	Bežigrad IceFest 2013	Bežigrad Stadium; Ljubljana, Slovenia	EBEL	Olimpija Ljubljana	8–4	Medveščak Zagreb	10,000		
January 8, 2013	Bežigrad IceFest 2013	Bežigrad Stadium; Ljubljana, Slovenia	EBEL	Olimpija Ljubljana	2–4	EC KAC	7,800		
January 20, 2013	2013 AHL Outdoor Classic	(United States) Hersheypark Stadium; Hershey, Pennsylvania	AHL	Hershey Bears	1–2 (OT)	Wilkes-Barre/Scranton Penguins	17,311		
February 9, 2013	Mutual of Omaha Battles on Ice	(United States) TD Ameritrade Park Omaha; Omaha, Nebraska	USHL	Omaha Lancers	4–2	Lincoln Stars	13,523	First outdoor USHL game	
February 9, 2013	Mutual of Omaha Battles on Ice	(United States) TD Ameritrade Park Omaha; Omaha, Nebraska	NCAA Division I men's (WCHA)	Omaha Mavericks (men)	2–5	North Dakota (men)	13,650		
February 17, 2013	2013 OfficeMax Hockey City Classic	(United States) Soldier Field; Chicago, Illinois	NCAA Division I men's (CCHA)	Notre Dame Fighting Irish (men)	2–1	Miami RedHawks (men)	52,051	fifth-highest attendance for an NCAA men's ice hockey game	
February 17, 2013	2013 OfficeMax Hockey City Classic	(United States) Soldier Field; Chicago, Illinois	NCAA Division I men's (WCHA)	Wisconsin Badgers (men)	3–2	Minnesota Golden Gophers (men)	52,051	fifth-highest attendance for an NCAA men's ice hockey game	
December 13, 2013	2013 EBEL Winter Classic	City Park; Budapest, Hungary	EBEL	Hydro Fehérvár AV19	6–3	EC Red Bull Salzburg	4,013		
December 13, 2013	Frozen Frontier	(United States) Frontier Field; Rochester, New York	AHL	Rochester Americans	5–4 (SO)	Lake Erie Monsters	11,015		
December 14, 2013	Frozen Frontier	(United States) Frontier Field; Rochester, New York	NCAA Division I women's (inter-conference)	RIT Tigers (women)	2–6	Clarkson Golden Knights (women)	1,578	First outdoor women's hockey game in the state of New York	
December 14, 2013	Frozen Frontier	(United States) Frontier Field; Rochester, New York	NCAA Division I men's (Atlantic Hockey)	RIT Tigers (men)	2–2 (OT)	Niagara Purple Eagles (men)	4,760		
December 14, 2013	2013 SHL Outdoor Classic (Note: The SEL Outdoor Classic was renamed the SHL Outdoor Classic due to the league name change in June 2013.)	Gamla Ullevi; Gothenburg, Sweden	SHL	Frölunda HC	1–4	Skellefteå AIK	13,452	Second SHL outdoor game in Gothenburg	
December 14, 2013	Open Ice Winter Classic Tampere	Tampere Stadium; Tampere, Finland	Liiga	Tappara	1–0	Ilves	15,062		
December 15, 2013	2013 EBEL Winter Classic	City Park; Budapest, Hungary	EBEL	Hydro Fehérvár AV19	2– (OT)	EC-KAC	4,013		
December 15, 2013	Frozen Frontier	(United States) Frontier Field; Rochester, New York	NCAA Division III men's (inter-conference)	Nazareth Golden Flyers (men)	2–3	Geneseo Knights (men)	1,000		
December 15, 2013	Frozen Frontier	(United States) Frontier Field; Rochester, New York	OJHL	Buffalo Jr. Sabres	4–5	St. Michael's Buzzers	1,173		
December 15, 2013	Frozen Frontier	(United States) Frontier Field; Rochester, New York	NHL/AHL Alumni	Rochester Americans alumni	5–3	Buffalo Sabres alumni	N/A	Game played in two halves	
December 16, 2013	2013 Hockeytown Winter Festival/ Great Lakes Invitational	(United States) Comerica Park; Detroit, Michigan	OUA	Windsor Lancers	2–5	Western Mustangs	1,000		
December 22, 2013	Winter Game 2013	Stade des Alpes; Grenoble, France	Ligue Magnus	Grenoble Brûleurs de Loups	4–5	Briançon Diables Rouges	19,767	French league attendance record (since broken)	
December 27, 2013	2013 Hockeytown Winter Festival/ Great Lakes Invitational	(United States) Comerica Park; Detroit, Michigan	NCAA Division I men's	Michigan Tech Huskies (men)	3–2 (SO)	Michigan State Spartans (men)	25,449		
December 27, 2013	2013 Hockeytown Winter Festival/ Great Lakes Invitational	(United States) Comerica Park; Detroit, Michigan	NCAA Division I men's	Michigan Wolverines (men)	2–3 (OT)	Western Michigan Broncos (men)	25,449		
December 28, 2013	Frozen Fenway 2014	(United States) Fenway Park; Boston, Massachusetts	NCAA Division I men's (Atlantic Hockey)	Bentley Falcons (men)	3–2	Holy Cross Crusaders (men)	3,898		
December 28, 2013	2013 Hockeytown Winter Festival/ Great Lakes Invitational	(United States) Comerica Park; Detroit, Michigan	NCAA Division I men's	Michigan Wolverines (men)	0–3	Michigan State Spartans (men)	26,052		
December 28, 2013	2013 Hockeytown Winter Festival/ Great Lakes Invitational	(United States) Comerica Park; Detroit, Michigan	NCAA Division I men's	Western Michigan Broncos (men)	1–0 (OT)	Michigan Tech Huskies (men)	26,052		
December 29, 2013	2013 Hockeytown Winter Festival	(United States) Comerica Park; Detroit, Michigan	CHL (OHL)	Saginaw Spirit	5–6	Windsor Spitfires	25,749	OHL and CHL attendance record (since broken)	
December 29, 2013	2013 Hockeytown Winter Festival	(United States) Comerica Park; Detroit, Michigan	CHL (OHL)	Plymouth Whalers	2–1 (SO)	London Knights	26,384	OHL and CHL attendance record	
December 30, 2013	2013 Hockeytown Winter Festival	(United States) Comerica Park; Detroit, Michigan	AHL	Grand Rapids Griffins	3–4 (SO)	Toronto Marlies	20,337		
December 31, 2013	2013 Hockeytown Winter Festival	(United States) Comerica Park; Detroit, Michigan	NHL Alumni	Detroit Red Wings alumni	5–4	Toronto Maple Leafs alumni	33,425		
December 31, 2013	2013 Hockeytown Winter Festival	(United States) Comerica Park; Detroit, Michigan	NHL Alumni	Detroit Red Wings alumni	6–5 (SO)	Toronto Maple Leafs alumni	33,425		
January 1, 2014	2014 NHL Winter Classic	(United States) Michigan Stadium; Ann Arbor, Michigan	NHL	Detroit Red Wings	2–3 (SO)	Toronto Maple Leafs	105,491 (announced) < 104,173 (certified)	NHL attendance record	
January 4, 2014	Frozen Fenway 2014	(United States) Fenway Park; Boston, Massachusetts	NCAA Division I men's (Hockey East)	Merrimack Warriors (men)	1–1	Providence Friars (men)	31,569		
January 4, 2014	Frozen Fenway 2014	(United States) Fenway Park; Boston, Massachusetts	NCAA Division I men's (Hockey East)	Boston College Eagles (men)	4–3	Notre Dame Fighting Irish (men)	31,569		
January 7, 2014	Frozen Fenway 2014	(United States) Fenway Park; Boston, Massachusetts	NCAA Division III men's (inter-conference)	Salem State Vikings (men)	2–4	UMass Boston Beacons (men)	1,133		
January 7, 2014	Frozen Fenway 2014	(United States) Fenway Park; Boston, Massachusetts	NCAA Division III men's (NESCAC)	[[Williams Ephs (men)]]	4–2	[[Trinity Bantams (men)]]	4,132		
January 9, 2014	Frozen Fenway 2014	(United States) Fenway Park; Boston, Massachusetts	NCAA Division III men's (ECAC East)	Babson Beavers (men)	0–1	Norwich Cadets (men)	1,200		
January 11, 2014	Frozen Fenway 2014	(United States) Fenway Park; Boston, Massachusetts	NCAA Division I men's (Hockey East)	Northeastern Huskies (men)	4–1	UMass Lowell River Hawks (men)	25,580		
January 11, 2014	Frozen Fenway 2014	(United States) Fenway Park; Boston, Massachusetts	NCAA Division I men's (Hockey East)	Boston University Terriers (men)	3–7	Maine Black Bears (men)	25,580		
January 11, 2014	2014 NLA Winter Classic	Stade de Genève; Geneva, Switzerland	NLA	Genève-Servette HC	0–1 (OT)	Lausanne Hockey Club	29,400		
January 17, 2014	2014 Hockey City Classic	(United States) TCF Bank Stadium; Minneapolis, Minnesota	NCAA Division I women's (WCHA)	Minnesota Golden Gophers (women)	4–0	Minnesota State Mavericks (women)	6,623		
January 17, 2014	2014 Hockey City Classic	(United States) TCF Bank Stadium; Minneapolis, Minnesota	NCAA Division I men's (Big Ten)	Minnesota Golden Gophers (men)	1–0	Ohio State Buckeyes (men)	45,021	seventh-highest attendance for NCAA men's hockey	
January 19, 2014	Russian Classic	Central Stadium; Chelyabinsk, Russia	VHL	Chelmet Chelyabinsk	2–5	Lada Togliatti	9,200		
January 25, 2014	2014 NHL Stadium Series	(United States) Dodger Stadium; Los Angeles, California	NHL	Los Angeles Kings	0–3	Anaheim Ducks	54,099		
January 26, 2014	2014 NHL Stadium Series	(United States) Yankee Stadium; New York, New York	NHL	New Jersey Devils	3–7	New York Rangers (Note: The Rangers were designated as the visiting team for their outdoor games held in New York City as a legal fiction; their home arena, Madison Square Garden, receives tax-exempt status, but only if the Rangers do not "cease playing" home games at MSG, generally interpreted as playing any "home" game outside of MSG.)	50,105		
January 29, 2014	2014 NHL Stadium Series	(United States) Yankee Stadium; New York, New York	NHL	New York Islanders	1–2	New York Rangers	50,027		
March 1, 2014	2014 NHL Stadium Series	(United States) Soldier Field; Chicago, Illinois	NHL	Chicago Blackhawks	5–1	Pittsburgh Penguins	62,921		
March 1, 2014	2014 Talviklassikko	Helsinki Olympic Stadium; Helsinki, Finland	Liiga	Jokerit	1–2	HIFK	23,485		
March 2, 2014	2014 Heritage Classic	(Canada) BC Place; Vancouver, British Columbia	NHL	Vancouver Canucks	2–4	Ottawa Senators	54,194	BC Place's retractable roof was closed due to weather concerns.	
December 18, 2014	2015 Slovenian Winter Classic	Republic Square Open Ice Rink; Ljubljana, Slovenia	Slovenian Ice Hockey League	HDD Olimpija Ljubljana	2–1	HDD Jesenice	3,500		
December 27, 2014	Toledo Walleye Winterfest	(United States) Fifth Third Field; Toledo, Ohio	ECHL	Toledo Walleye	1–2	Kalamazoo Wings	11,222	First ECHL outdoor game	
January 1, 2015	2015 NHL Winter Classic	(United States) Nationals Park; Washington, D.C.	NHL	Washington Capitals	3–2	Chicago Blackhawks	42,832		
January 3, 2015	Toledo Walleye Winterfest	(United States) Fifth Third Field; Toledo, Ohio	NCAA Division I men's	Bowling Green Falcons (men)	2–2	Robert Morris Colonials (men)	3,806		
January 3, 2015	Toledo Walleye Winterfest	(United States) Fifth Third Field; Toledo, Ohio	ECHL	Toledo Walleye	2–3 (SO)	Fort Wayne Komets	11,081		
January 3, 2015	2015 EBEL Winter Classic	Wörthersee Stadion; Klagenfurt, Austria	EBEL	EC KAC	1–4	EC VSV	29,700		
January 10, 2015	2015 DEL Winter Game	ESPRIT arena Düsseldorf, Germany	DEL	DEG	3–2	Kölner Haie	51,125	Attendance record for a European league match (since broken); DEL attendance record	
January 23, 2015	2015 QMJHL Winter Classic	(Canada) Grandes Estrades Coors Banquet; Saint-Tite, Quebec	CHL (QMJHL)	Shawinigan Cataractes	4–2	Victoriaville Tigres	5,996		
January 24, 2015	2015 QMJHL Winter Classic	(Canada) Grandes Estrades Coors Banquet; Saint-Tite, Quebec	CHL (QMJHL)	Shawinigan Cataractes	2–3	Quebec Remparts	7,323		
February 7, 2015	2015 Hockey City Classic	(United States) Soldier Field; Chicago, Illinois	NCAA Division I men's (NCHC)	Western Michigan Broncos (men)	3–4	Miami RedHawks (men)	22,751		
February 7, 2015	2015 Hockey City Classic	(United States) Soldier Field; Chicago, Illinois	NCAA Division I men's (Big Ten)	Michigan State Spartans (men)	1–4	Michigan Wolverines (men)	22,751		
February 14, 2015	Russian Classic	Sputnik Stadium; Nizhny Tagil, Russia	VHL	Sputnik Nizhny Tagil	0–4	Yuzhny Ural Orsk	9,000		
February 21, 2015	2015 NHL Stadium Series	(United States) Levi's Stadium; Santa Clara, California	NHL	San Jose Sharks	1–2	Los Angeles Kings	70,205		
December 18, 2015	Golden State Hockey Rush	(United States) Raley Field; West Sacramento, California	AHL	Stockton Heat	3–2	Bakersfield Condors	9,357	Postponed from December 17, 2015 due to rain	
December 31, 2015	2016 Outdoor Women's Classic	(United States) Gillette Stadium; Foxborough, Massachusetts	NWHL/CWHL	Boston Pride	1–1	Les Canadiennes	Unknown	First professional women's outdoor game	
December 31, 2015	2016 NHL Winter Classic Alumni Game	(United States) Gillette Stadium; Foxborough, Massachusetts	NHL Alumni	Boston Bruins alumni	5–4 (SO)	Montreal Canadiens alumni	Unknown		
January 1, 2016	2016 NHL Winter Classic	(United States) Gillette Stadium; Foxborough, Massachusetts	NHL	Boston Bruins	1–5	Montreal Canadiens	67,246		
January 3, 2016	Brno Hockey Games 2016	Stadium Za Lužánkami; Brno, Czech Republic	ELH	Kometa Brno	5–2	Škoda Plzeň	18,514		
January 8, 2016	Brno Hockey Games 2016	Stadium Za Lužánkami; Brno, Czech Republic	ELH	Kometa Brno	2–4	Sparta Praha	21,502	Set the new ELH attendance record (since broken)	
January 9, 2016	2016 DEL2 Winter Derby	Stadion Dresden; Dresden, Germany	DEL2	Dresdner Eislöwen	4–3 (OT)	Lausitzer Füchse	31,853	DEL2 attendance record (since broken)	
February 20, 2016	Battle on Blake	(United States) Coors Field; Denver, Colorado	NCAA Division I men's (NCHC)	Denver Pioneers (men)	4–1	Colorado College Tigers (men)	35,144	NCHC attendance record; set a new all-sports record attendance for a Denver Pioneers home team sporting event	
February 21, 2016	2016 NHL Stadium Series	(United States) TCF Bank Stadium; Minneapolis, Minnesota	NHL	Minnesota Wild	6–1	Chicago Blackhawks	50,426		
February 27, 2016	2016 NHL Stadium Series	(United States) Coors Field; Denver, Colorado	NHL	Colorado Avalanche	3–5	Detroit Red Wings	50,095		
September 10, 2016	2016 DEL2 Summer Game	Commerzbank Arena; Frankfurt, Germany	DEL2	Löwen Frankfurt	4–5 (OT)	Kassel Huskies	30,000		
October 23, 2016	2016 NHL Heritage Classic	(Canada) Investors Group Field; Winnipeg, Manitoba	NHL	Winnipeg Jets	0–3	Edmonton Oilers	33,240		
December 16, 2016	Ulkojäät 2016	Tampere, Finland	Liiga	Ilves	3–4 (OT)	Tappara	11,000		
December 17, 2016	Ulkojäät 2016	Tampere, Finland	Liiga	Ilves	3–2 (OT)	HIFK	8,500		
December 28, 2016	Karácsonyi HOKIBULI Winter Game 2016	Városligeti Műjégpálya; Budapest, Hungary	EBEL	SAPA Fehérvár AV 19	2–8	EC Red Bull Salzburg	4,253		
December 29, 2016	Karácsonyi HOKIBULI Winter Game 2016	Városligeti Műjégpálya; Budapest, Hungary	MOL Liga	Újpesti TE	4–1	HSC Csíkszereda	2,000		
December 29, 2016	Karácsonyi HOKIBULI Winter Game 2016	Városligeti Műjégpálya; Budapest, Hungary	MOL Liga	MAC Budapest	6–3	DVTK Jegesmedvék	3,050		
December 30, 2016	Karácsonyi HOKIBULI Winter Game 2016	Városligeti Műjégpálya; Budapest, Hungary	EBEL	SAPA Fehérvár AV 19	5–2	EC KAC	4,242		
December 30, 2016	Winter Game 2016	Parc Olympique Lyonnais; Décines-Charpieu, France	Ligue Magnus	Lyon Lions	2–5	Grenoble; Brûleurs de Loups	25,182	Tickets distributed; official French league attendance record	
January 1, 2017	NHL Centennial Classic	(Canada) BMO Field; Toronto, Ontario	NHL	Toronto Maple Leafs	4–3 (OT)	Detroit Red Wings	40,148		
January 2, 2017	2017 NHL Winter Classic	(United States) Busch Stadium; St. Louis, Missouri	NHL	St. Louis Blues	4–1	Chicago Blackhawks	46,556		
January 5, 2017	Frozen Fenway 2017	(United States) Fenway Park; Boston, Massachusetts	NCAA Division I men's (Atlantic Hockey)	Army Black Knights (men)	1–3	Bentley Falcons (men)	3,348		
January 7, 2017	2017 DEL Winter Game	Rhein-Neckar-Arena; Sinsheim, Germany	DEL	Schwenninger Wild Wings	3–7	Adler Mannheim	25,022		
January 7, 2017	2017 AHL Outdoor Classic	(United States) Memorial Stadium; Bakersfield, California	AHL	Bakersfield Condors	3–2 (OT)	Ontario Reign	12,330		
January 8, 2017	Frozen Fenway 2017	(United States) Fenway Park; Boston, Massachusetts	NCAA division I men's (Hockey East)	Boston University Terriers (men)	5–3	UMass Minutemen (men)	19,547		
January 8, 2017	Frozen Fenway 2017	(United States) Fenway Park; Boston, Massachusetts	NCAA division I men's (Hockey East)	Boston College Eagles (men)	3–1	Providence Friars (men)	19,547		
January 10, 2017	Frozen Fenway 2017	(United States) Fenway Park; Boston, Massachusetts	NCAA division I women's (ECAC)	Harvard Crimson (women)	1–3	Boston College Eagles (women)	801		
January 12, 2017	Frozen Fenway 2017	(United States) Fenway Park; Boston, Massachusetts	NCAA division III women's (NESCAC)	Connecticut College Camels (women)	0–3	Bowdoin Polar Bears (women)	1,000		
January 12, 2017	Frozen Fenway 2017	(United States) Fenway Park; Boston, Massachusetts	NCAA division III men's (New England Hockey)	UMass Boston Beacons (men)	5–1	Babson Beavers (women)	1,800		
January 14, 2017	Frozen Fenway 2017	(United States) Fenway Park; Boston, Massachusetts	NCAA division I men's (Hockey East)	New Hampshire Wildcats (men)	2–2	Northeastern Huskies (men)	16,432		
January 14, 2017	Frozen Fenway 2017	(United States) Fenway Park; Boston, Massachusetts	NCAA division I men's (Hockey East)	Connecticut Huskies (men)	0–4	Maine Black Bears (men)	16,432		
January 21, 2017	2017 GET-ligaen Winter Classic	Fredrikstad Stadion; Fredrikstad, Norway	GET-ligaen	Stjernen Hockey	0–3	Sparta Warriors	12,500		
February 25, 2017	2017 NHL Stadium Series	(United States) Heinz Field; Pittsburgh, Pennsylvania	NHL	Pittsburgh Penguins	4–2	Philadelphia Flyers	67,318		
February 26, 2017	—N/a	(United States) Heinz Field; Pittsburgh, Pennsylvania	NCAA Division I men's (Atlantic Hockey)	Robert Morris (men)	5–1	Niagara Purple Eagles (men)	3,219		
December 2, 2017	Helsinki Ice Challenge	Kaisaniemi Park; Helsinki, Finland	KHL/Liiga	Jokerit	3–4	SKA Saint Petersburg	17,645	First KHL regular season outdoor game; KHL attendance record (since broken)	
December 5, 2017	Helsinki Ice Challenge	Kaisaniemi Park; Helsinki, Finland	KHL/Liiga	HIFK	3–4 (OT)	Oulun Kärpät	16,000		
December 16, 2017	NHL 100 Classic	(Canada) TD Place Stadium; Ottawa, Ontario	NHL	Ottawa Senators	3–0	Montreal Canadiens	33,959		
December 17, 2017	67:50 Outdoor Game	(Canada) TD Place Stadium; Ottawa, Ontario	CHL (OHL/QMJHL)	Ottawa 67's	1–4	Gatineau Olympiques	11,671	First OHL outdoor game to be played in Ontario. Also the first outdoor game to feature a team from both the OHL and QMJHL	
December 29, 2017	2018 WJHC	(United States) New Era Field; Orchard Park, New York	IIHF WJHC	United States men's national junior ice hockey team	4–3 (SO)	Canada men's national junior ice hockey team	44,592	First IIHF Junior World Championship Top Division outdoor game, junior hockey attendance world record	
January 1, 2018	2018 NHL Winter Classic	(United States) Citi Field; Queens, New York	NHL	Buffalo Sabres	2–3 (OT)	New York Rangers	41,821		
January 10, 2018	2018 Hockey Day Minnesota	(United States) Eastman Park; St. Cloud, Minnesota	NCAA Division I women's (WCHA)	St. Cloud State (women)	1-1	Minnesota Duluth Bulldogs (women)	2,011		
January 20, 2018	Winter Ice Break	Riga City Council Sports Complex; Riga, Latvia	KHL	Dinamo Riga	2–3	Dinamo Minsk	10,554	First outdoor hockey game played in Latvia	
January 20, 2018	2018 AHL Outdoor Classic	(United States) Hersheypark Stadium; Hershey, Pennsylvania	AHL	Hershey Bears	2–5	Lehigh Valley Phantoms	13,091		
January 27, 2018	Dutchmen Outdoor Classic	(United States) Hersheypark Stadium; Hershey, Pennsylvania	NCAA Division III women's	Lebanon Valley Dutchmen (women)	0–9	Elmira Soaring Eagles (women)	113		
January 27, 2018	Dutchmen Outdoor Classic	(United States) Hersheypark Stadium; Hershey, Pennsylvania	NCAA Division III men's	Lebanon Valley Dutchmen (men)	7–0	Chatham Cougars (men)	480		
January 28, 2018	Russian Classic	Central Stadium; Kurgan, Russia	VHL	Zauralie Kurgan	0–4	Rubin Tyumen	3,000		
February 9, 2018	2018 QMJHL Winter Classic	(Canada) La Patinoire Victor-Pepin; Drummondville, Quebec	CHL (QMJHL)	Drummondville Voltigeurs	4–1	Sherbrooke Phoenix	4,284		
February 10, 2018	2018 QMJHL Winter Classic	(Canada) La Patinoire Victor-Pepin; Drummondville, Quebec	CHL (QMJHL)	Drummondville Voltigeurs	0–2	Victoriaville Tigres	5,432		
March 3, 2018	2018 NHL Stadium Series	(United States) Navy–Marine Corps Memorial Stadium; Annapolis, Maryland	NHL	Washington Capitals	5–2	Toronto Maple Leafs	29,516		
January 1, 2019	2019 NHL Winter Classic	(United States) Notre Dame Stadium; Notre Dame, Indiana	NHL	Chicago Blackhawks	2–4	Boston Bruins	76,126		
January 2, 2019	2019 Tatzen-Derby	Stade de Suisse; Bern, Switzerland	NLA	SCL Tigers	1–4	SC Bern	20,000	Although the game was played in Bern, the SCL Tigers hosted the game as the home team	
January 5, 2019	Let's Take This Outside	(United States) Notre Dame Stadium; Notre Dame, Indiana	NCAA Division I men's (Big Ten)	Notre Dame Fighting Irish (men)	2–4	Michigan Wolverines (men)	23,422		
January 12, 2019	2019 DEL Winter Game	RheinEnergieStadion; Cologne, Germany	DEL	Kölner Haie	2–3 (OT)	DEG	47,011		
January 18, 2019	2019 Hockey Day Minnesota	(United States) Lake Bemidji; Bemidji, Minnesota	NCAA Division I men's (CCHA)	Bemidji State Beavers (men)	4–3 OT	Michigan Tech Huskies (men)	4,201		
January 18, 2019	2019 Hockey Day Minnesota	(United States) Lake Bemidji; Bemidji, Minnesota	NCAA Division I women's (WCHA)	Bemidji State Beavers (women)	1–2	Minnesota State Mavericks (women)	1,307		
February 3, 2019	2019 Winter Classic Games	Štadión SNP; Banská Bystrica, Slovakia	Tipsport liga	HC Banská Bystrica	2–3	HKM Zvolen	7,500	First outdoor game in Slovakia; a legends game was held at the arena the day before the game. Team Tipsport defeated Team Kaufland 23–21.	
February 8, 2019	2019 QMJHL Winter Classic	(Canada) Grandes Estrades Coors Banquet; Saint-Tite, Quebec	CHL (QMJHL)	Shawinigan Cataractes	0–4	Rimouski Oceanic	4,508		
February 9, 2019	2019 QMJHL Winter Classic	(Canada) Grandes Estrades Coors Banquet; Saint-Tite, Quebec	CHL (QMJHL)	Shawinigan Cataractes	5–1	Quebec Remparts	5,587		
February 23, 2019	2019 NHL Stadium Series	(United States) Lincoln Financial Field; Philadelphia, Pennsylvania	NHL	Philadelphia Flyers	4–3 (OT)	Pittsburgh Penguins	69,620		
October 26, 2019	2019 NHL Heritage Classic	(Canada) Mosaic Stadium; Regina, Saskatchewan	NHL	Winnipeg Jets	2–1 (OT)	Calgary Flames	33,518	First outdoor NHL game to be played in a neutral site territory that is not formally part of an NHL market	
October 27, 2019	2019 WHL Prairie Classic	(Canada) Mosaic Stadium; Regina, Saskatchewan	WHL	Regina Pats	4–5 (OT)	Calgary Hitmen	15,401		
December 14, 2019	2019 DEL2 Winter Derby	Sparda-Bank-Hessen-Stadion Offenbach, Germany	DEL2	EC Bad Nauheim	2–3 (SO)	Löwen Frankfurt	15,146		
January 1, 2020	2020 NHL Winter Classic	(United States) Cotton Bowl Stadium; Dallas, Texas	NHL	Dallas Stars	4–2	Nashville Predators	85,630		
January 4, 2020	2020 Hockey Open Air	Rudolf-Harbig-Stadion; Dresden, Germany	DEL2	Dresdner Eislöwen	5–3	Lausitzer Füchse	32,009	DEL2 attendance record	
January 4, 2020	2020 Hockey Open Air	Rudolf-Harbig-Stadion; Dresden, Germany	ELH	Sparta Prague	3–2	HC Verva Litvínov	32,009	First regular season ELH game outside Czech Republic; ELH attendance record	
January 18, 2020	2020 Hockey Day Minnesota	(United States) Parade Stadium; Minneapolis, Minnesota	NCAA Division I women's (WCHA)	Minnesota Golden Gophers (women)	2-1	Ohio State Buckeyes (women)	2,100		
February 15, 2020	2020 NHL Stadium Series	(United States) Falcon Stadium; Air Force Academy, Colorado	NHL	Colorado Avalanche	1–3	Los Angeles Kings	43,574		
February 17, 2020	Faceoff at Falcon Stadium	(United States) Falcon Stadium; Air Force Academy, Colorado	NCAA Division I men's	Air Force Facons (men)	2–4	Colorado College (men)	7,178		
February 20, 2021	NHL Outdoors at Lake Tahoe	(United States) Edgewood Tahoe Resort; Stateline, Nevada	NHL	Colorado Avalanche	3–2	Vegas Golden Knights	—N/a	Held on a golf course, played without spectators	
February 21, 2021	NHL Outdoors at Lake Tahoe	(United States) Edgewood Tahoe Resort; Stateline, Nevada	NHL	Boston Bruins	7–3	Philadelphia Flyers	—N/a	Held on a golf course, played without spectators	
December 26, 2021	Toledo Walleye Winterfest	Fifth Third Field; Toledo, Ohio	ECHL	Kalamazoo Wings	3–2 (SO)	Toledo Walleye	11,231		
December 31, 2021	Toledo Walleye Winterfest	Fifth Third Field; Toledo, Ohio	ECHL	Indy Fuel	2–7	Toledo Walleye			
January 1, 2022	2022 NHL Winter Classic	(United States) Target Field; Minneapolis, Minnesota	NHL	Minnesota Wild	4–6	St. Louis Blues	38,519		
January 22, 2022	2022 Hockey Day Minnesota	(United States) Blakeslee Stadium; Mankato, Minnesota	NCAA Division I men's (CCHA)	Minnesota State Mavericks (men)	7-1	St. Thomas Tommies (men)	10,002		
February 26, 2022	2022 NHL Stadium Series	(United States) Nissan Stadium; Nashville, Tennessee	NHL	Nashville Predators	2–3	Tampa Bay Lightning	68,619		
March 13, 2022	2022 NHL Heritage Classic	(Canada) Tim Hortons Field; Hamilton, Ontario	NHL	Buffalo Sabres	5–2	Toronto Maple Leafs	26,119		
March 14, 2022	2022 OHL Outdoor Showcase	(Canada) Tim Hortons Field; Hamilton, Ontario	OHL	Hamilton Bulldogs	3–0	Oshawa Generals	12,587		
November 19, 2022	2022 Outdoor Classic	(United States) Truist Field Charlotte, North Carolina	AAU (ACCHL)	University of North Carolina at Charlotte	3–5	Wake Forest University	2,900	First outdoor hockey game ever played in North Carolina	
December 3, 2022	2022 DEL Winter Game	RheinEnergieStadion; Cologne, Germany	DEL	Kölner Haie	4-2	Adler Mannheim	40,163		
December 10, 2022	Cologne Stadium Series	RheinEnergieStadion; Cologne, Germany	2. Liga Nord	KEC "Die Haie" (women)	2-1	EC Bergisch Land (women)	180	Germany's first women outdoor game	
December 10, 2022	Cologne Stadium Series	RheinEnergieStadion; Cologne, Germany	DNL	Kölner Junghaie	7-2	Eisbären Juniors Berlin	241		
December 17, 2022	2022 Eishockey Open Air	Heinz von Heiden Arena; Hanover, Germany	Oberliga Nord	Hannover Indians	2-5	Hannover Scorpions	35,000	Record attendance for German Oberliga (third tier)	
December 22, 2022	Cologne Stadium Series	RheinEnergieStadion; Cologne, Germany	DEL	Kölner Haie	1-2	Fischtown Pinguins	14,352		
January 2, 2023	2023 NHL Winter Classic	(United States) Fenway Park; Boston, Massachusetts	NHL	Boston Bruins	2–1	Pittsburgh Penguins	39,243		
January 6, 2023	Frozen Fenway 2023	(United States) Fenway Park; Boston, Massachusetts	NCAA Division I women's (ECAC Hockey)	Harvard Crimson (women)	1–3	Quinnipiac Bobcats (women)	391		
January 6, 2023	Frozen Fenway 2023	(United States) Fenway Park; Boston, Massachusetts	NCAA Division I men's (Hockey East)	Boston University Terriers (women)	2–3	Holy Cross Crusaders (women)	2,800		
January 7, 2023	Frozen Fenway 2023	(United States) Fenway Park; Boston, Massachusetts	NCAA Division I men's (Hockey East)	Northeastern Huskies (men)	4–1	Connecticut Huskies (men)	22,500		
January 7, 2023	Frozen Fenway 2023	(United States) Fenway Park; Boston, Massachusetts	NCAA Division I men's (Hockey East)	UMass Minutemen (men)	2–4	Boston College Eagles (men)	22,500		
January 8, 2023	Cologne Stadium Series	RheinEnergieStadion; Cologne, Germany	DEL	Kölner Haie	5-2	Augsburger Panther	14,915		
January 13, 2023	2023 Kaufland Winter Games	Tehelné pole Bratislava, Slovakia	ELH	Oceláři Třinec	6–1	Kometa Brno	11,367		
January 14, 2023	2023 Kaufland Winter Games	Tehelné pole Bratislava, Slovakia	Tipos Extraliga	HK Dukla Trenčín	2–1	HKM Zvolen	7,776		
January 15, 2023	2023 Kaufland Winter Games	Tehelné pole Bratislava, Slovakia	Tipos Extraliga	HC Slovan Bratislava	3–1	HC Košice	14,244		
February 17, 2023	John Carroll University Outdoor Classic	(United States) FirstEnergy Stadium; Cleveland, Ohio	ACHA Division I men's	John Carroll University	5–4	Canisius University	855	First Outdoor Hockey game ever played at First Energy Stadium	
February 18, 2023	Faceoff on the Lake	(United States) FirstEnergy Stadium; Cleveland, Ohio	NCAA Division I men's (Big Ten)	Ohio State	4–2	Michigan	45,523	sixth-highest attendance for NCAA men's hockey; highest attendance for an outdoor college hockey game held at a "neutral site" venue (Note: Cleveland is far from the campuses of either school, and is located roughly equidistant from each)	
February 18, 2023	2023 NHL Stadium Series	(United States) Carter–Finley Stadium; Raleigh, North Carolina	NHL	Carolina Hurricanes	4–1	Washington Capitals	56,961		
February 20, 2023	Frozen Finley	(United States) Carter–Finley Stadium; Raleigh, North Carolina	ACHA Division II men's	NC State Icepack Hockey	7-3	UNC Tar Heel Hockey	24,000+	exact attendance number is unknown, additional sections beyond allotted seating opened up due to demand	
March 4, 2023	Cleveland Monsters Outdoor Classic	(United States) FirstEnergy Stadium; Cleveland, Ohio	AHL	Cleveland Monsters	3-2 (OT)	Wilkes-Barre/Scranton Penguins	22,875		
October 29, 2023	2023 NHL Heritage Classic	(Canada) Commonwealth Stadium; Edmonton, Alberta	NHL	Edmonton Oilers	5-2	Calgary Flames	55,411		
November 17, 2023	2023 Outdoor Classic	(United States) Truist Field Charlotte, North Carolina	ACHA (ACCHL)	University of North Carolina at Charlotte	5–6 (OT)	Appalachian State University	4,200		
January 1, 2024	2024 NHL Winter Classic	(United States) T-Mobile Park; Seattle, Washington	NHL	Seattle Kraken	3–0	Vegas Golden Knights	47,313		
January 13, 2024	Queen City Outdoor Classic	(United States) Truist Field; Charlotte, North Carolina	AHL	Charlotte Checkers	5-2	Rochester Americans	11,031		
February 16, 2024	Hockey Outdoor Triple	Sparkasse Vogtland Arena; Klingenthal, Germany	DEL2	Eispiraten Crimmitschau	7-3	Dresdner Eislöwen	12,400	Held in a ski jumping venue	
February 17, 2024	Hockey Outdoor Triple	Sparkasse Vogtland Arena; Klingenthal, Germany	ELH	HC Energie Karlovy Vary	2-5	HC Škoda Plzeň	13,000	Held in a ski jumping venue	
February 17, 2024	2024 NHL Stadium Series	(United States) MetLife Stadium; East Rutherford, New Jersey	NHL	New Jersey Devils	6–3	Philadelphia Flyers	70,328		
February 18, 2024	2024 NHL Stadium Series	(United States) MetLife Stadium; East Rutherford, New Jersey	NHL	New York Islanders	5-6 (OT)	New York Rangers	79,690		
February 18, 2024	Hockey Outdoor Triple	Sparkasse Vogtland Arena; Klingenthal, Germany	DEL2	Lausitzer Füchse	2-3 (OT)	Eisbären Regensburg	10,600		
November 22, 2024	Light the Knights College Hockey Series	(United States) Truist Field Charlotte, North Carolina	AAU	University of North Carolina at Charlotte	5–1	Appalachian State University			
November 23, 2024	Light the Knights College Hockey Series	(United States) Truist Field Charlotte, North Carolina	AAU; ACHA	North Carolina State University	2–6	University of South Carolina	4,031	NC State competes in the ACCHL within the ACHA, South Carolina competes in College Hockey South within the AAU.	
December 31, 2024	2025 NHL Winter Classic	(United States) Wrigley Field; Chicago, Illinois	NHL	Chicago Blackhawks	2-6	St. Louis Blues	40,933		
January 3, 2025	Frozen Confines	(United States) Wrigley Field; Chicago, Illinois	NCAA Division I men's (Big Ten)	Ohio State Buckeyes (men)	4-3	Michigan Wolverines	25,709		
January 3, 2025	Frozen Confines	(United States) Wrigley Field; Chicago, Illinois	NCAA Division I men's (Big Ten)	Penn State Nittany Lions (men)	3-4 (SO)	Notre Dame Fighting Irish (men)	25,709		
January 4, 2025	Frozen Confines	(United States) Wrigley Field; Chicago, Illinois	NCAA Division I women's (WCHA)	Ohio State Buckeyes (women)	4-3 (SO)	Wisconsin Badgers (women)	24,788		
January 4, 2025	Frozen Confines	(United States) Wrigley Field; Chicago, Illinois	NCAA Division I men's (Big Ten)	Wisconsin Badgers (men)	3-4 (OT)	Michigan State Spartans (men)	24,788		
January 4, 2025	Light the Knights College Hockey Series	(United States) Truist Field Charlotte, North Carolina	ACHA (ACCHL)	University of North Carolina at Chapel Hill	0–6	Virginia Tech		Both teams announced the game as a sellout on social media, but did not provide exact figures.	
January 4, 2025	2025 DEL Winter Game	Deutsche Bank Park; Frankfurt, Germany	DEL	Löwen Frankfurt	5-1	Adler Mannheim	45,110		
January 25, 2025	Satakunnan Talviklassikko	Porin tekojäärata Pori, Finland	Liiga	Ässät	4–5 OT	Lukko	7,122		
January 26, 2025	Satakunnan Talviklassikko	Porin tekojäärata Pori, Finland	Liiga	Lukko	1–4	Ässät			
March 1, 2025	2025 NHL Stadium Series	(United States) Ohio Stadium; Columbus, Ohio	NHL	Columbus Blue Jackets	5–3	Detroit Red Wings	94,751		
November 13, 2025	704 Outdoor Faceoff	(United States) Truist Field Charlotte, North Carolina	ACHA (ACCHL)	Coastal Carolina University	4–9	Auburn University			
November 14, 2025	704 Outdoor Faceoff	(United States) Truist Field Charlotte, North Carolina	ACHA (ACCHL)	University of North Carolina at Chapel Hill	3–4 OT	University of South Carolina			
November 15, 2025	704 Outdoor Faceoff	(United States) Truist Field Charlotte, North Carolina	ACHA (ACCHL)	North Carolina State University	2–4	University of Alabama	2,227		
November 20, 2025	704 Outdoor Faceoff	(United States) Truist Field Charlotte, North Carolina	ACHA (ACCHL)	East Carolina University	3–2 OT	Georgia Institute of Technology			
November 21, 2025	704 Outdoor Faceoff	(United States) Truist Field Charlotte, North Carolina	ACHA (ACCHL)	Virginia Tech	3–4 OT	University of Georgia			
November 22, 2025	704 Outdoor Faceoff	(United States) Truist Field Charlotte, North Carolina	ACHA (ACCHL)	University of North Carolina at Charlotte	5–4	Appalachian State University	3,000+	Exact attendance number is unknown	
November 28, 2025	2025 Classique Hivernale de Trois Rivieres	(Canada) Hippodrome 3R Trois-Rivières, Quebec	OUA	UQTR Patriotes	2–1 (OT)	McGill Redbirds			
November 29, 2025	2025 Classique Hivernale de Trois Rivieres	(Canada) Hippodrome 3R Trois-Rivières, Quebec	LNAH	Eastern All Stars		Western All Stars			
December 4, 2025	2025 Classique Hivernale de Trois Rivieres	(Canada) Hippodrome 3R Trois-Rivières, Quebec	QMJHL	Shawinigan Cataractes	1:4	Drummondville Voltigeurs		Coupe de La 55 Semi-Final	
December 5, 2025	2025 Classique Hivernale de Trois Rivieres	(Canada) Hippodrome 3R Trois-Rivières, Quebec	QMJHL	Sherbrooke Phoenix	2:3	Victoriaville Tigres		Coupe de La 55 Semi-Final	
December 6, 2025	2025 Classique Hivernale de Trois Rivieres	(Canada) Hippodrome 3R Trois-Rivières, Quebec	QMJHL	Shawinigan Cataractes	5:1	Sherbrooke Phoenix		Coupe de la 55 Third Place	
December 7, 2025	2025 Classique Hivernale de Trois Rivieres	(Canada) Hippodrome 3R Trois-Rivières, Quebec	QMJHL	Drummondville Voltigeurs	5:0	Victoriaville Tigres		Coupe de la 55 Final	
January 2, 2026	2026 NHL Winter Classic	(United States) LoanDepot Park; Miami, Florida	NHL	Florida Panthers	1–5	New York Rangers	36,153	First outdoor professional hockey game in the state of Florida.	
January 10, 2026	2026 DEL Winter Game	Rudolf-Harbig-Stadion; Dresden, Germany	DEL	Dresdner Eislöwen	2–3 (OT)	Eisbären Berlin	32,248		
January 17, 2026	2026 Bend Outdoor Classic	(United States) The Pavilion Bend, Oregon	ACHA Division I men's	University of Oregon		University of Alabama			
January 23, 2026	2026 Hockey Day Minnesota	(United States) Tradition Veterans Complex Hastings, Minnesota	AHL	Iowa Wild		Milwaukee Admirals			
January 31, 2026	2026 EOJHL Outdoor Classic	(Canada) Jim Tubman Rink Ottawa, Ontario	EOJHL	Ottawa Canadians	4-3 (OT)	Ottawa West Golden Knights	320	First Junior B outdoor hockey game in Canada	
January 29, 2026		(United States) Beaver Stadium; University Park, Pennsylvania	NCAA Division I women's (AHA)	Penn State Nittany Lions (women's)	3-0	Robert Morris Colonials (women's)	1,838		
February 1, 2026	2026 NHL Stadium Series	(United States) Raymond James Stadium; Tampa, Florida	NHL	Tampa Bay Lightning	6-5 (SO)	Boston Bruins	64,617		
February 2, 2026		(United States) Beaver Stadium; University Park, Pennsylvania	NCAA Division I men's (Big Ten)	Penn State Nittany Lions (men's)	4-5 (OT)	Michigan State Spartans (men's)	74,575	second-highest NCAA men's hockey attendance	

== See also ==
- List of ice hockey games with highest attendance
- Hockey Day Minnesota
