= Hockey Day =

Hockey Day may refer one of the following days during the National Hockey League regular season:

- Hockey Day in Canada
- Hockey Day in America
- Hockey Day Minnesota
