= Nate Prosser =

American ice hockey player

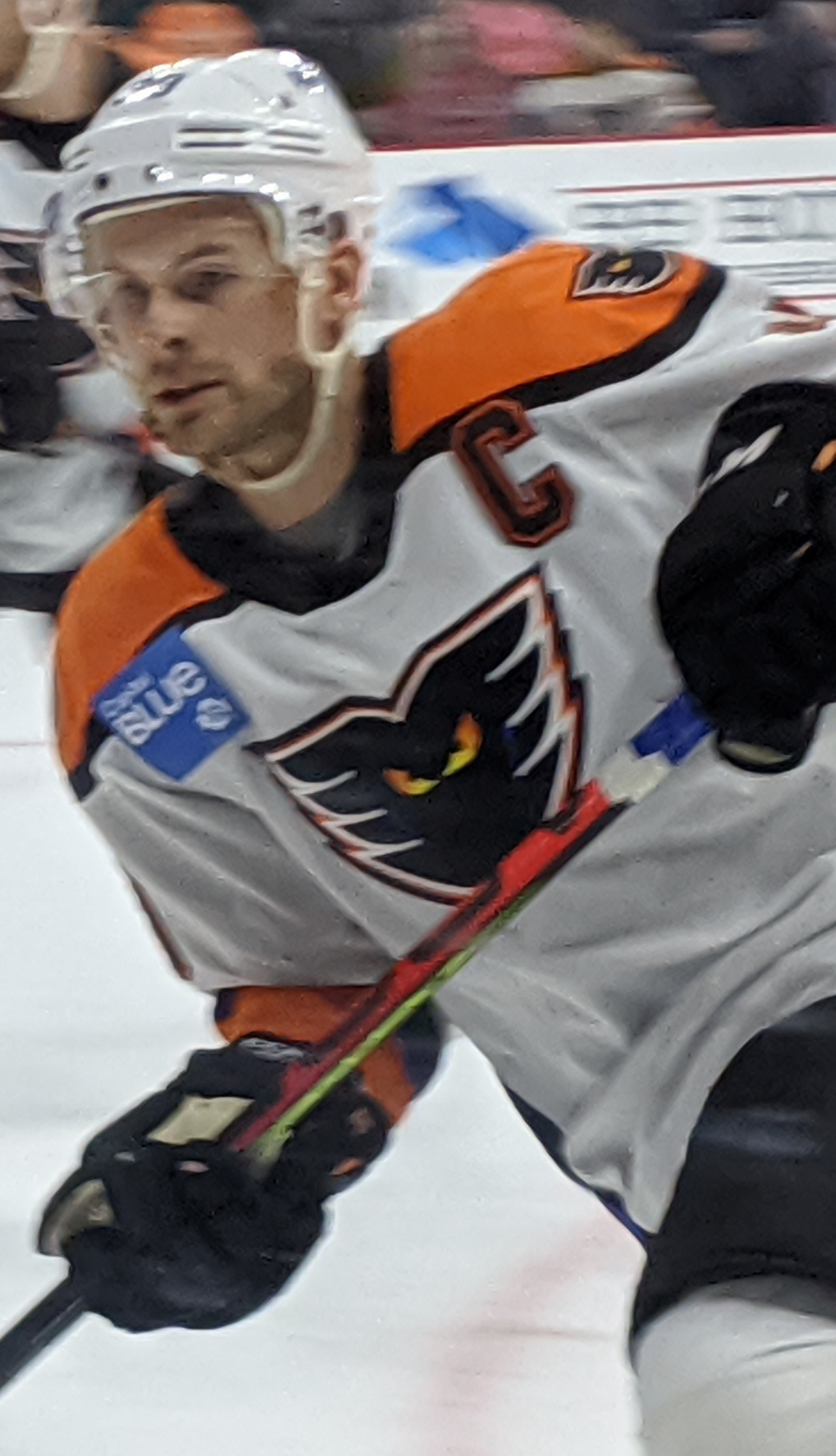
- Prosser with the Lehigh Valley Phantoms in 2020
- Born: May 7, 1986 (age 40) Elk River, Minnesota, U.S.
- Height: 6 ft 2 in (188 cm)
- Weight: 201 lb (91 kg; 14 st 5 lb)
- Position: Defense
- Shot: Right
- Played for: Minnesota Wild; St. Louis Blues; Philadelphia Flyers
- NHL draft: Undrafted
- Playing career: 2010–2021

Nathanael Christian Prosser (born May 7, 1986) is an American former ice hockey defenseman who played in the National Hockey League (NHL) from 2010 to 2022. He played for the Minnesota Wild, St. Louis Blues, and Philadelphia Flyers.

Growing up in Elk River, Minnesota, Prosser attended Elk River High School where he was a two-time All Conference selection and played in two State Tournaments. He experienced a growth spurt in his junior year and left Elk River as a senior to begin playing for the Sioux Falls Stampede of the United States Hockey League (USHL). He subsequently earned a full ride to play for the Colorado College Tigers for four years before signing an entry-level contract with the Minnesota Wild.

== Early life ==
Prosser was born on May 7, 1986, in Elk River, Minnesota, to mother Margaret, an aerobics instructor and personal trainer, and father Chris, who used to play hockey at Anoka High School and at West Point. Prosser grew up alongside two older siblings and his brother Luke taught him to play hockey. Due to his short stature, Prosser played defence or goaltender growing up because he was not able to keep up with the forwards.

== Playing career ==
=== Amateur ===
Growing up in Elk River, Minnesota, Prosser attended Elk River High School where he was a two-time All Conference selection and played in two State Tournaments. During his junior year, he experienced a growth spurt and went from 5 ft 2 in (1.57 m) to 6 ft 0 in (1.83 m), which resulted in more views from scouts and invites to junior hockey tryout camps. He was named captain of the Elk River hockey team in his senior year before he received a proposition from the Sioux Falls Stampede of the United States Hockey League (USHL) who asked him to join their team.

Prosser played two full seasons with the Stampede, and while serving as captain led them to the 2005–06 Anderson Cup championship. However, he suffered from two concussions during his time in the USHL and was only allowed to return to the ice if he used an extra-padded helmet. After going undrafted into the National Hockey League (NHL) during his years of eligibility, his family adviser encouraged him to attend development camps with the St. Louis Blues and New York Islanders while attending Colorado College.

=== Collegiate ===
Prosser attended Colorado College for four years, during which he played for the Colorado College Tigers. In his freshman year, Prosser split his time on ice with fellow freshman Kris Fredheim and recorded three assists in 21 games. One of his assists came on the game-winning goal in a 7–2 home-ice win over Minnesota State.

In his junior season, Prosser played in all 38 games and recorded five goals, the most amongst Tigers' defensemen. With his assistance, the Tigers tied with the Wisconsin Badgers for third place in the WCHA but were swept by the Minnesota-Duluth Bulldogs in the WCHA first round. He returned to Tigers for his senior year and was named to the All-WCHA Second Team.

=== Professional ===
==== Minnesota Wild ====
On March 18, 2010, Prosser concluded his collegiate career by signing a one-year entry-level contract with the Minnesota Wild. After signing the contract, Prosser immediately made his NHL debut on April 5, 2010, against the Edmonton Oilers as a result of various injuries. He finished the game by assisting on Andrew Brunette's 25th goal of the season in the 4–1 loss and playing 19 minutes of ice time. During the off-season, he travelled with members of the team on the Minnesota Wild Road Tour as part of a fundraiser for Sioux Falls Youth Hockey. Prosser also signed another one-year contract to remain with the team for the 2010–11 season.

Prosser returned to the Wild for 2010–11 training camp but was re-assigned to their American Hockey League (AHL) affiliate, the Houston Aeros, to begin the season. He played in 58 games, recording 19 points, before being recalled by the Wild for the first time that season on February 23, 2011. With his assistance, the Aeros won their third Conference Championship and became the runner up in the 2011 Calder Cup Finals against the Binghamton Senators.

Prosser returned to the Wild for their 2011–12 Training Camp but was re-assigned to the Houston Aeros. After being re-called to the NHL level in early January, Prosser suffered an illegal check from Phoenix Coyotes forward Raffi Torres who was subsequently suspended two games for charging. The following month, Prosser was signed to a two-year contract extension on February 6, 2012. The day after signing the extension, Prosser said in an interview he would celebrate the contract "by scoring against the Blue Jackets." As a result, he then scored his first career NHL goal on February 7, 2012, against Curtis Sanford of the Columbus Blue Jackets in an eventual 3–1 loss. Later in the season, Prosser headbutted Jamal Mayers during a scrum in front of the Chicago Blackhawks' net. For his action he was suspended for one game.

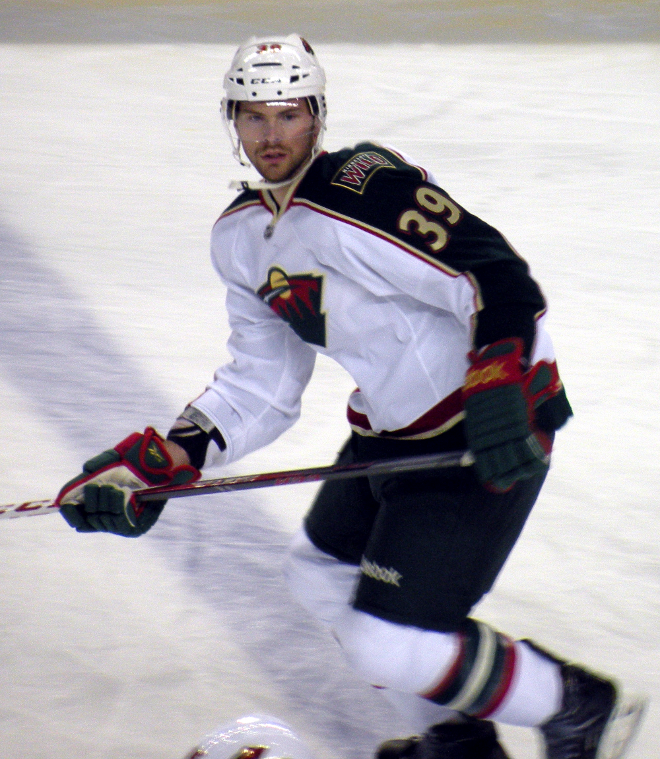
Prosser playing for the Minnesota Wild on February 23, 2013.

The 2012–13 season was the first season Prosser began the season with the Wild and remained there for the entirety of the season. On January 18, 2014, Prosser scored the game-winning overtime goal against the Dallas Stars on Hockey Day Minnesota. The Hockey Day Minnesota event was being hosted in Elk River, Minnesota that year, the town Prosser was born in.

==== St. Louis Blues and return to Minnesota ====
On July 21, 2014, after four seasons within the Wild organization, Prosser left as a free agent to sign a one-year, two-way contract with the St. Louis Blues. However, Prosser did not win a spot on the Blues roster during training camp for the 2014–15 season and was placed on waivers by the team. On October 2, 2014, Prosser was re-claimed by the Wild off waivers.

Nearing the conclusion of the 2015–16 season, Prosser was the Wild's nomination for the Bill Masterton Memorial Trophy as a "player who best exemplifies the qualities of perseverance, sportsmanship and dedication to hockey." His nomination was the result of his support for charity initiatives including Defending The Blue Line, Children’s Hospitals and Clinics of Minnesota and Wishes & More.

On August 3, 2017, Prosser signed a two-year contract with the St. Louis Blues worth $1.3 million and $650,000 annually. He began the 2017–18 season as a healthy scratch before making his debut with the Blues in a 5–2 victory over the Calgary Flames on October 25, 2017. Prosser was unable to add to his lone appearance with the Blues, resuming his role as a reserve on the blueline. On November 29, 2017, he was placed on waivers by the Blues, and was claimed by the Wild, marking his third stint with the club on November 30.

==== Philadelphia Flyers ====
On July 1, 2019, Prosser again left the Wild as a free agent to sign a two-year, two-way contract with the Philadelphia Flyers worth $700,000 per season. After attending the Flyers' training camp prior to the 2019–20 season, he was re-assigned to their AHL affiliate, the Lehigh Valley Phantoms. On October 4, 2019, Prosser was named co-captain of the Phantoms alongside Andy Andreoff and Cal O'Reilly.

In the second year of his contract, entering the pandemic delayed 2020–21 season, Prosser was re-assigned to their Taxi Squad. Speaking of his assignment, Prosser said: "It’s a little different this year being on the taxi squad but I’m trying to enjoy my time. I don’t have many years left in me. I’m 34, turn 35 soon [in May]. I’m just trying to have some fun with it." As a result of injuries, Prosser made his debut with the Philadelphia Flyers on January 28, 2021, against the New Jersey Devils, where he netted his first goal since April 2018.

Prosser announced his retirement from professional ice hockey on January 11, 2022.

== Personal life ==
Prosser and his wife Brittani have four daughters together. Prosser is a devout Christian and presented his personal testimony through Hockey Ministries.

== Career statistics ==
			Regular season					Playoffs
Season	Team	League	GP	G	A	Pts	PIM	GP	G	A	Pts	PIM
2003–04	Sioux Falls Stampede	USHL	32	0	7	7	35	—	—	—	—	—
2004–05	Sioux Falls Stampede	USHL	60	4	20	24	97	—	—	—	—	—
2005–06	Sioux Falls Stampede	USHL	58	3	27	30	100	14	0	5	5	16
2006–07	Colorado College	WCHA	21	0	3	3	8	—	—	—	—	—
2007–08	Colorado College	WCHA	39	3	17	20	51	—	—	—	—	—
2008–09	Colorado College	WCHA	38	5	8	13	61	—	—	—	—	—
2009–10	Colorado College	WCHA	39	4	24	28	58	—	—	—	—	—
2009–10	Minnesota Wild	NHL	3	0	1	1	8	—	—	—	—	—
2010–11	Houston Aeros	AHL	73	8	19	27	31	24	2	2	4	16
2010–11	Minnesota Wild	NHL	2	0	0	0	0	—	—	—	—	—
2011–12	Houston Aeros	AHL	23	0	4	4	10	2	1	0	1	2
2011–12	Minnesota Wild	NHL	51	1	11	12	57	—	—	—	—	—
2012–13	Minnesota Wild	NHL	17	0	0	0	4	—	—	—	—	—
2013–14	Minnesota Wild	NHL	53	2	6	8	58	10	0	0	0	12
2014–15	Minnesota Wild	NHL	63	2	5	7	32	1	0	0	0	2
2015–16	Minnesota Wild	NHL	54	0	3	3	39	6	0	1	1	0
2016–17	Minnesota Wild	NHL	39	2	5	7	12	3	0	1	1	2
2017–18	St. Louis Blues	NHL	1	0	0	0	0	—	—	—	—	—
2017–18	Minnesota Wild	NHL	56	3	6	9	19	5	0	1	1	14
2018–19	Minnesota Wild	NHL	15	0	0	0	2	—	—	—	—	—
2018–19	Iowa Wild	AHL	31	1	7	8	20	11	0	1	1	4
2019–20	Lehigh Valley Phantoms	AHL	59	1	9	10	47	—	—	—	—	—
2020–21	Philadelphia Flyers	NHL	6	1	1	2	0	—	—	—	—	—
NHL totals			360	11	38	49	231	25	0	3	3	30

== Awards and honors ==
Award	Year	Ref
College
All-WCHA Second Team	2009–10	
