= Helsinki Ice Challenge =

2017 Helsinki Ice Challenge (Game 1)
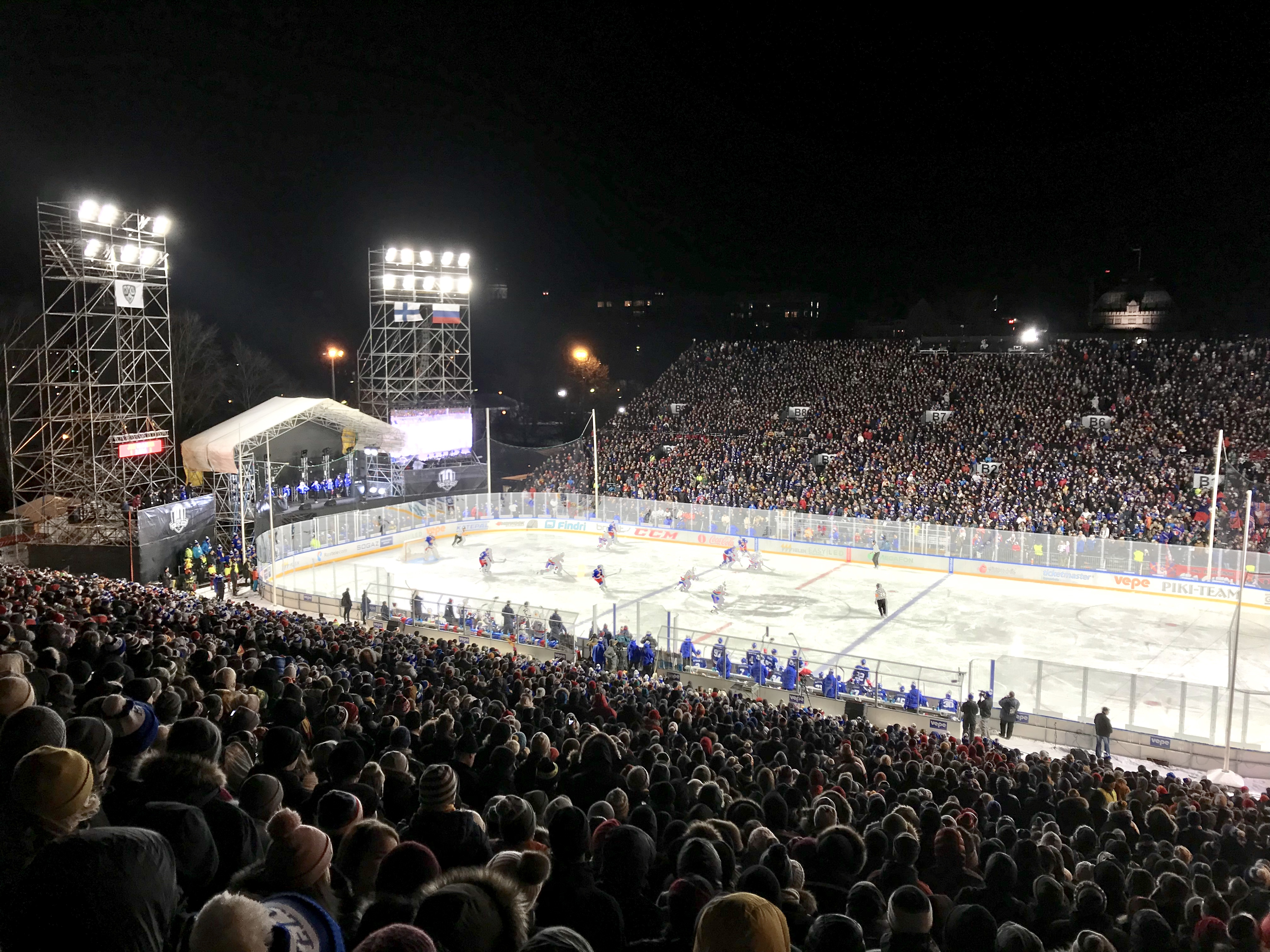
	1	2	3	Total
SKA Saint Petersburg	2	1	1	4
Jokerit	1	1	1	3
- Date: December 2, 2017
- Venue: Kaisaniemi Park
- City: Helsinki, Finland
- Attendance: 17,645

2017 Helsinki Ice Challenge (Game 2)
	1	2	3	OT	Total
Oulun Kärpät	0	3	0	1	4
HIFK	0	0	3	0	3
- Date: December 5, 2017
- Arena: Kaisaniemi Park
- City: Helsinki, Finland
- Attendance: 16,000

The Helsinki Ice Challenge was a series of two ice hockey regular season games (one for the Kontinental Hockey League (KHL) and one for the SM-liiga respectively) which were scheduled to be played outdoors. Jokerit played against SKA Saint Petersburg in the first match and the second match was HIFK playing against Oulun Kärpät. Both games took place at Kaisaniemi Park in Helsinki, Finland on December 2 and December 5, 2017, respectively.

== The Games ==
- Bolded teams denote winners

Year	Date	Venue	Location	Visiting team	Home team	Score	Attendance	Notes
2017	December 2, 2017	Kaisaniemi Park	Helsinki, Finland	**SKA Saint Petersburg**	Jokerit	4–3	17,645	
2017	December 5, 2017	Kaisaniemi Park	Helsinki, Finland	**Oulun Kärpät**	HIFK	4–3 (OT)	16,000	
