= Oregon Ducks men's ice hockey =

- University: University of Oregon
- Conference: Independent
- Head coach: Jackson Hyman; 2023-present season, 0–0–0
- Arena: The Rink Exchange; Eugene, Oregon
- Colors: Green and yellow

Conference tournament champions
- 2005, 2008, 2009, 2019, 2020, 2022

The Oregon Ducks men's ice hockey is a college ice hockey program that represents the University of Oregon. The Ducks play off campus at 2,700-seat The Rink Exchange. They are a member of the American Collegiate Hockey Association (ACHA) at the ACHA Division I level. The team is independent within the ACHA. The University does not currently have an NCAA varsity team, and thus the club team is the highest level of hockey offered by the University.

== History ==
The Ducks have been playing since 1989 and are a student-run, student-focused organization supported primarily by member dues as well as donations. Since the club's start, the team has won six PAC-8 Championships at the Division II level in ten appearances.

In the spring of 2022, it was announced that the Ducks will be moving up to the American Collegiate Hockey Association (ACHA) Division I. In their first season at the Division I level, they finished with 9 wins and 18 losses.
