= Hockey Day Minnesota =

Holiday in Minnesota

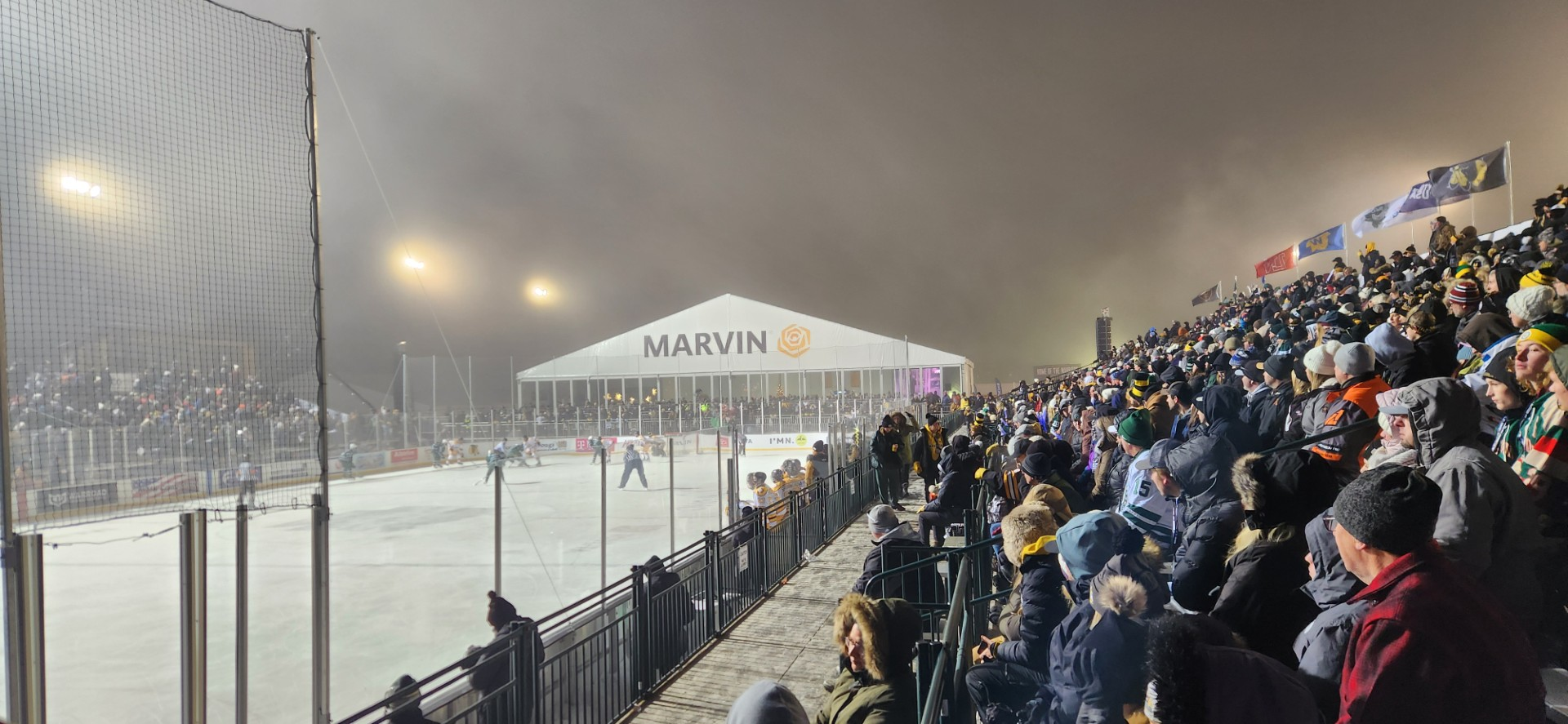
Fans in attendance for Hockey Day Minnesota 2024 in Warroad Minnesota

Hockey Day Minnesota is an annual event in Minnesota run in cooperation with the Minnesota Wild and Minnesota Hockey that celebrates the sport of hockey throughout the state. Now a multi-day showcase, the event is held in mid-to-late January or early February and typically consists of multiple high school games (a mixture of boys and girls), a men's and/or women's college hockey game, and concludes with a Minnesota Wild NHL game. With some games now taking place on Thursday and Friday, the main set of games are played on a Saturday and are broadcast on regional television networks. Most of the games are played at a featured outdoor location with a rink built specifically for the event. However, some of the college matchups are played in standard home arenas and all of the Wild games are played in an NHL venue (usually Grand Casino Arena).

== 2007 Hockey Day Minnesota (Baudette) January 20, 2007 ==
Hockey Day Minnesota 2007 was the 1st of the series and was played outside on Baudette Bay.

Home team	Away team	Level	Location	TV	Date	Time	Result
Lake of the Woods	St. Paul Johnson	MSHSL Boys	Baudette Bay	FSN	Sat, Jan 20	1:00 PM	Lake of the Woods 5–3
Minnesota	Denver	NCAA Men	Mariucci Arena	FSN	Sat, Jan 20	5:30 PM	Minnesota 5–4
Minnesota Wild	Dallas Stars	NHL	Xcel Energy Center	FSN	Sat, Jan 20	8:00 PM	Dallas Stars 2-1 (SO)

== 2008 Hockey Day Minnesota (Baudette Bay) February 9, 2008 ==
Game	Location	Time	Result
Eveleth at Lake of the Woods School	Baudette Bay	10:00 am	5-0 Lake of the Woods
Hill-Murray vs. St. Thomas Academy	Xcel Energy Center	1:00 pm	Hill-Murray 4 St. Thomas Academy 3 (OT)
Blaine vs Roseau	Baudette Bay	2:00	Roseau 1 Blaine 0
New York Islanders at Minnesota Wild	Xcel Energy Center	5:00	Wild - 4-3 (OT)
Minnesota Golden Gophers at Denver Pioneers	Magness Arena	8:00	Pioneers - 4–1

== 2009 Hockey Day Minnesota (St. Paul) January 17, 2009 ==
Game	Location	Time	Result
Rochester John Marshall vs. St. Paul Johnson	Phalen Park	10:00 am	Johnson 4–0
White Bear Lake vs. Duluth East	Xcel Energy Center	1:00	DE - 6–3
Stillwater vs. Minnetonka (girls)	Phalen Park	1:30(tape delay on TV)	Stillwater 2–1
Minnesota Golden Gophers vs. St. Cloud State	National Hockey Center	5:00	U of M - 8–6
Anaheim Ducks vs. Minnesota Wild	Xcel Energy Center	8:00	Ducks - 3–0

== 2010 Hockey Day Minnesota (Hermantown) January 23, 2010 ==
Game	Location	Time	Result
Hopkins vs. The Marshall School	Hermantown (Outdoors)	10:00 am	Hopkins - 6–0
Hermantown vs. Eden Prairie	Hermantown (Outdoors)	1:15 pm	EP - 4–3
Minnesota Golden Gophers vs. St. Cloud State	Mariucci Arena	5:00	SCSU - 4–1
Columbus Blue Jackets vs. Minnesota Wild	Xcel Energy Center	8:00	Wild - 4–2

== 2011 Hockey Day Minnesota (Moorhead) February 12, 2011 ==
Game	Location	Time	Result
Wayzata vs. Roseau	Moorhead (Outdoors)	10:00 am	Wayzata 2-1 (OT)
Hill-Murray vs. Moorhead	Moorhead (Outdoors)	1:30 pm	H-M 3–2
Minnesota Golden Gophers vs. Denver Pioneers	Mariucci Arena	5:00	U of M 7–3
St. Louis Blues vs. Minnesota Wild	Xcel Energy Center	8:00	Wild - 3–1

== 2012 Hockey Day Minnesota (Lake Minnetonka/Excelsior) January 21, 2012 ==
The games, normally played outdoors, had to be moved indoors due to warm weather causing poor ice conditions.

Game	Location	Time	Result
Minnetonka vs. Hopkins (girls)	Pagel Activity Center	Tape Delay 11 PM	Minnetonka 5–1
White Bear Lake vs. Grand Rapids	Pagel Activity Center	10:00 AM	Grand Rapids 4–3
Minnetonka vs. Duluth East	Pagel Activity Center	1:30 PM	Minnetonka 9–3
Minnesota Golden Gophers vs. Colorado College	Mariucci Arena	5:00 PM	Gophers 2–1
Dallas Stars vs. Minnesota Wild	Xcel Energy Center	8:00 PM	Wild 5–2

== 2013 Hockey Day Minnesota (Grand Rapids) January 19, 2013 ==
The 2013 HDM broadcast included the Season/Home Opener for the Minnesota Wild for the 2013 NHL season after the 2012-2013 NHL Lockout was resolved. This year also included the last WCHA (regular season) meeting between Minnesota and North Dakota before Minnesota moved to the Big Ten Hockey Conference, and North Dakota moved to the National Collegiate Hockey Conference in 2013–2014.

Game	Location	Time	Result
Hibbing-Chisholm vs. Grand Rapids-Greenway (girls)	Lake Pokegama	Tape Delay 11 PM	Grand Rapids-Greenway 6–0
Hibbing-Chisholm vs. Eagan	Lake Pokegama	10:00 AM	Eagan 9–2
Benilde St. Margaret's vs. Grand Rapids	Lake Pokegama	1:30 PM	Grand Rapids 3-2 (OT)
Minnesota Golden Gophers vs. University of North Dakota	Mariucci Arena	5:00 PM	Tie 4-4 (OT)
Colorado Avalanche vs. Minnesota Wild	Xcel Energy Center	8:00 PM	Wild 4–2

== 2014 Hockey Day Minnesota (Elk River) January 18, 2014 ==
2014 Hockey Day Minnesota was hosted at Handke Pit.

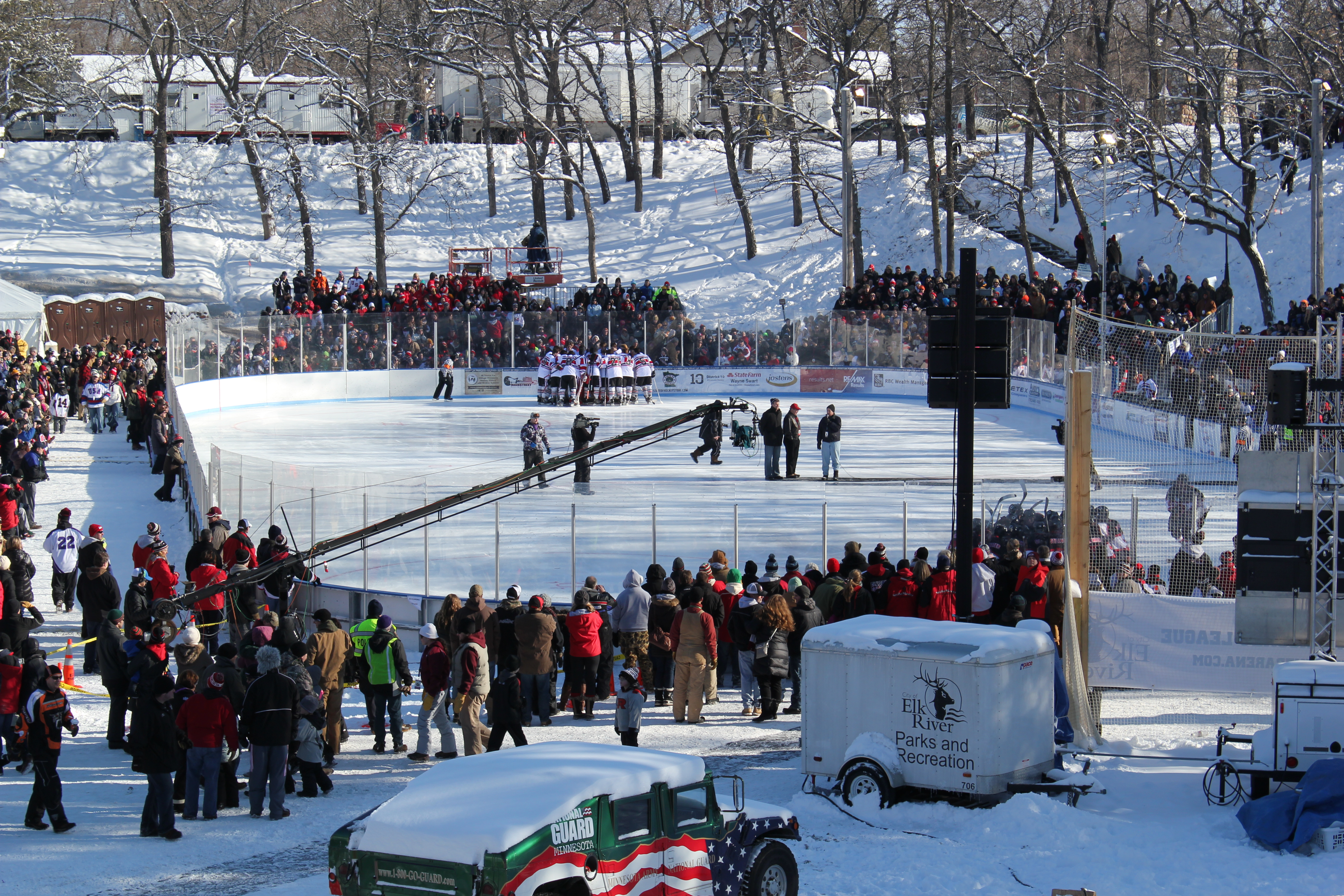
Elk River native Nate Prosser scored the game-winning goal in the Minnesota Wild game against the Dallas Stars in a 3–2 overtime victory.

Game	Location	Time	Result
Rochester Lourdes vs Cloquet/Esko/Carlton (Boys)	Handke Pit	10:15 AM	Cloquet/Esko/Carlton 4–1
Elk River vs Stillwater (Boys)	Handke Pit	1:00 PM	Elk River 4–1
Elk River vs Anoka (Girls)	Handke Pit	Tape Delay 4:00 PM	Anoka 3–0
Ohio State University vs. Minnesota Golden Gophers	Mariucci Arena	5:00 PM	Gophers 4–2
Dallas Stars vs. Minnesota Wild	Xcel Energy Center	8:00 PM	Wild 3-2 (OT)

== 2015 Hockey Day Minnesota (St. Paul) January 17, 2015 ==
The official name for Hockey Day Minnesota 2015 is "St. Paul to Kuwait" to celebrate Minnesota troops' service in Iraq and Kuwait. Fox Sports North personalities and crew broadcast the Wild game in Kuwait around 5 AM local time for the stationed troops to watch.

Game	Location	Time	Result
St. Paul Johnson vs Luverne (Boys)	Holman Field	10:00 AM	St. Paul Johnson 6–5
Hill-Murray vs. St. Thomas Academy	Holman Field	1:30 PM	Hill Murray 3-2 OT
Cretin-Derham Hall vs. Duluth Northern Stars (Girls)	Holman Field	Tape Delay 4:30 PM	Cretin-Derham Hall, 5–4
Wisconsin Badgers vs. Minnesota Golden Gophers	Mariucci Arena	5:00 PM	Gophers, 5–2
Arizona Coyotes vs. Minnesota Wild	Xcel Energy Center	8:00 PM	Wild 3–1

== 2016 Hockey Day Minnesota (Duluth) February 6, 2016 ==
Hockey Day Minnesota 2016 was the 10th of the series and was played outside in Bayfront Park.

Game	Location	Time	Result
Duluth Denfeld vs Eveleth-Gilbert (Boys)	Bayfront Park (outdoors)	10:00 AM	Duluth Denfeld 5–2
Duluth East vs. Lakeville North (Boys)	Bayfront Park (outdoors)	1:00 PM	Lakeville North 3–2
Minnesota Golden Gophers vs. Penn State	Mariucci Arena	4:00 PM	Penn State 5–3
St. Louis Blues vs. Minnesota Wild	Scottrade Center	7:00 PM	Blues 4–1

== 2017 Hockey Day Minnesota (Stillwater) January 21, 2017 ==
Hockey Day Minnesota 2017 was the 11th of the series and was played outside in Lowell Park.

Game	Location	TV	Time	Result
Thief River Falls vs. Mahtomedi (Boys)	Lowell Park, Stillwater	FSN	10:00 AM	Mahtomedi 3–0
Eden Prairie vs. Stillwater (Boys)	Lowell Park, Stillwater	FSN	1:00 PM	EP 4–1
MSU - Mankato vs. St. Cloud State (Women)	Herb Brooks National Hockey Center	FSN+	3:00 PM	SCSU 4–3
Minnesota Golden Gophers vs. Wisconsin	Kohl Center	FSN	5:00 PM	UW 5–3
Minnetonka vs. Stillwater (Girls)	Lowell Park, Stillwater	FSN+	5:30 PM	Stillwater 2–0
Minnesota Wild vs. Anaheim Ducks	Xcel Energy Center	FSN	7:00 PM	Wild 5–3

== 2018 Hockey Day Minnesota (Saint Cloud) January 19/20, 2018 ==
Hockey Day Minnesota 2018 was the 12th of the series and was played outside next to Lake George.

Home team	Away team	Level	Location	TV	Date	Time	Result
St. Cloud	Sartell/Sauk Rapids	MSHSL Girls	Lake George	None	Fri, 1/19	5:00 PM	Tie 3-3
Team White	Team Black	SCSU Women's Alumni	Lake George	None	Fri, 1/19	7:30 PM	Tie 3-3
Team Hedican	Team Parrish	SCSU Men's Alumni	Lake George	None	Fri, 1/19	8:00 PM	Team Hedican 7–3
St. Cloud Tech/Apollo	St. Cloud Cathedral	MSHSL Boys	Lake George	FSN	Sat, 1/20	10:00 AM	St Cloud Cathedral 8–3
St. Cloud State	Minnesota Duluth	NCAA Women	Lake George	FSN	Sat, 1/20	1:00 PM	St. Cloud State 2-1 (SO)
Moorhead	Centennial	MSHSL Boys	Lake George	FSN	Sat, 1/20	4:30 PM	Moorhead 3-2 (OT)
St. Cloud State	Minnesota State	NCAA Men	National Hockey Center	FSN+	Sat, 1/20	5:00 PM	Minnesota State 5–2
Minnesota Wild	Tampa Bay Lightning	NHL	Xcel Energy Center	FSN	Sat, 1/20	8:00 PM	Minnesota Wild 5–2

== 2019 Hockey Day Minnesota (Bemidji) January 19, 2019 ==
Hockey Day Minnesota 2019 is the 13th of the series and was played outside on the shores of Lake Bemidji.

Game	Location	TV	Date	Time	Result
Bemidji vs. Woodbury (Girls)	Lake Bemidji	None	Thur., Jan. 17	7:00 PM	Woodbury 2–1
Bemidji State vs. Michigan Tech (Men's)	Lake Bemidji	None	Fri., Jan. 18	7:00 PM	Bemidji State 4-3 (OT)
Minnetonka vs. Andover (Boys)	Lake Bemidji	FSN	Sat., Jan. 19	9:30 AM	Minnetonka 5–2
Bemidji State vs. Minnesota State Mankato (Women's)	Lake Bemidji	FSN	Sat., Jan. 19	1:00 PM	Minnesota State Mankato 2–1
Minnesota Duluth vs. Ohio State (Women's)	Amsoil Arena	FSN+	Sat., Jan. 19	4:00 PM	Minnesota Duluth 6–3
Bemidji vs. Greenway (Boys)	Lake Bemidji	FSN	Sat., Jan. 19	4:30 PM	Bemidji 3–0
St. Cloud State vs. Western Michigan (Men's)	National Hockey Center	FSN+	Sat., Jan. 19	6:00 PM	St. Cloud State 5–2
Minnesota Wild vs. Columbus Blue Jackets	Xcel Energy Center	FSN	Sat., Jan. 19	8:00 PM	Minnesota 2–1

== 2020 Hockey Day Minnesota (Minneapolis) January 16/17/18, 2020 ==
Hockey Day Minnesota 2020 was the 14th of the series and was played outside at Parade Stadium.

Home team	Away team	Level	Location	TV	Date	Time	Result
Minneapolis	Academy of Holy Angels	MSHSL Girls	Parade Stadium	None	Thur, 1/16	6:00 PM	Minneapolis 3-2 (OT)
Blake	Grand Rapids/Greenway	MSHSL Girls	Parade Stadium	None	Thur, 1/16	8:00 PM	Blake 8–0
Team Minneapolis	Team Minnesota	Women's Alumni	Parade Stadium	None	Fri, 1/17	6:00 PM	
Team Minneapolis	Team Minnesota	NHL Alumni	Parade Stadium	None	Fri, 1/17	7:30 PM	
Minneapolis	Warroad	MSHSL Boys	Parade Stadium	FSN	Sat, 1/18	9:30 AM	Warroad 5–1
Blake	Blaine	MSHSL Boys	Parade Stadium	FSN	Sat, 1/18	1:00 PM	Blake 3–2
Minnesota	Ohio State	NCAA Women	Parade Stadium	FSN	Sat, 1/18	4:30 PM	Minnesota 2–1
St. Cloud State	Minnesota Duluth	NCAA Men	National Hockey Center	FSN+	Sat, 1/18	4:30 PM	St. Cloud State 2–0
Minnesota Wild	Dallas Stars	NHL	Xcel Energy Center	FSN	Sat, 1/18	8:00 PM	Minnesota Wild 7–0

== 2021 Hockey Day Minnesota (The Oval) February 27, 2021 ==
Hockey Day Minnesota 2021 was modified due to the COVID-19 pandemic. No high school or college games were played. The broadcast was 10 hours of continuous hockey programming, including classic games, featured content, and live interviews. The event was capped off by a live professional game between the Minnesota Wild and Los Angeles Kings.

Home team	Away team	Level	Location	TV	Date	Time	Result
Minnesota Wild	Los Angeles Kings	NHL	Xcel Energy Center	FSN	Sat, 2/27	7:00 PM	Minnesota Wild 4-3 (OT)

== 2022 Hockey Day Minnesota (Mankato), January 19–23, 2022 ==
Hockey Day Minnesota 2022 was the 16th of the series, with all games in the event except for the NHL game played outdoors at Blakeslee Stadium on the Minnesota State University campus. The event was originally scheduled for 2021 but was postponed due to COVID-19.

Game	Level	Location	TV	Date	Time	Result
Mankato East vs. Mankato West	MSHSL Girls	Blakeslee Stadium	None	Wed, 1/19	7:30 PM	Manakato East 5–0
Mankato vs St. Cloud	Wounded Warriors	Blakeslee Stadium	None	Thur, 1/20	5:30 PM	St. Cloud 6–2
River's Edge vs Mankato Clinic	Southern MN Celebrities	Blakeslee Stadium	None	Thur, 1/20	8:00 PM	Mankato Clinic 6–3
Mankato East vs. Mankato West	MSHSL Boys	Blakeslee Stadium	None	Fri, 1/21	5:30 PM	Mankato East 5–0
Team Brose vs Team Blue	MSU Men's Alumni	Blakeslee Stadium	None	Fri, 1/21	8:30 PM	
Andover vs. Edina	MSHSL Girls	Blakeslee Stadium	BSN	Sat, 1/22	9:30 AM	Andover 4–0
East Grand Forks vs. Prior Lake	MSHSL Boys	Blakeslee Stadium	BSN	Sat, 1/22	1:00 PM	Prior Lake 7–1
Minnesota State vs. St. Thomas	NCAA Men	Blakeslee Stadium	BSN	Sat, 1/22	4:30 PM	Minnesota State 7–1
Minnesota Wild vs. Chicago Blackhawks	NHL	Xcel Energy Center	BSN	Sat, 1/22	8:00 PM	Minnesota Wild 4-3 (OT)
Team Altmann vs Team Vogt	MSU Women's Alumni	Blakeslee Stadium	None	Sun, 1/23	11:00 AM	
Minnesota State vs. St. Thomas	NCAA Women	Blakeslee Stadium	None	Sun, 1/23	1:00 PM	Minnesota State 3–1
Minnesota Mullets vs Steele County Blades	USPHL (Juniors)	Blakeslee Stadium	None	Sun, 1/23	4:30 PM	Steele County Blades 5–2

== 2023 Hockey Day Minnesota (White Bear Lake), January 26–28, 2023 ==
The 17th annual edition of Hockey Day Minnesota took place at Polar Lakes Park located in White Bear Lake, Minnesota. The event was capped by the home town Bears losing to their rivals, the Hill-Murray Pioneers. Fireworks were set off before the end of the regulation starting early celebrations before Pioneer Head Coach Bill Lechner pulled his goalie to score and force overtime.

Game	Level	Location	TV	Date	Time	Result
Forest Lake vs. Cretin-Derham Hall	MSHSL Girls	Polar Lakes Park	None	Thur, 1/26	5:30 PM	Cretin-Derham Hall 4–1
St. John's University vs Augsburg University	NCAA Division 3 Men's	Polar Lakes Park	None	Fri, 1/27	5:45 PM	St John's 5-4 (OT)
White Bear Lake vs Stillwater	MSHSL Girls	Polar Lakes Park	BSN	Sat, 1/28	9:30 AM	Stillwater 8–3
Mahtomedi vs. Hermantown	MSHSL Boys	Polar Lakes Park	BSN	Sat, 1/28	1:00 PM	Hermantown 6–3
White Bear Lake vs. Hill-Murray	MSHSL Boys	Polar Lakes Park	BSN	Sat, 1/28	4:30 PM	Hill-Murray 3-2 (OT)
Minnesota Wild vs. Buffalo Sabres	NHL	Xcel Energy Center	BSN	Sat, 1/28	8:00 PM	Minnesota Wild 3-2 (SO)

== 2024 Hockey Day Minnesota (Warroad), January 25–27, 2024 ==
The 18th edition of Hockey Day Minnesota took place in Warroad, Minnesota at the Warroad Athletic Complex. This years event included history from local athletes who were on the 1960 and 1980 gold medal-winning USA men's hockey teams as well as connections to the Indigenous history of the community.

Game	Level	Location	TV	Date	Time	Result
Thief River Falls vs. Waseca	MSHSL Boys	Warroad Athletic Complex	None	Thur, 1/25	5:30 PM	Thief River Falls 6–2
Lake of the Woods vs. Kittson County Central	MSHSL Boys	Warroad Athletic Complex	None	Thur, 1/25	7:30 PM	Lake of the Woods 5–1
Concordia College vs St. Olaf	NCAA Division 3 Men's	Warroad Athletic Complex	None	Fri, 1/26	5:30 PM	Concordia College 4–2
Warroad Alumni vs. Roseau Alumni	Alumni Game	Warroad Athletic Complex	None	Fri, 1/26	8:00 PM	Roseau Alumni 6–2
Warroad vs Lakeville North	MSHSL Girls	Warroad Athletic Complex	BSN	Sat, 1/27	9:30 AM	Lakeville North 4–3
Moorhead vs. Wayzata	MSHSL Boys	Warroad Athletic Complex	BSN	Sat, 1/27	1:00 PM	Wayzata 6–2
Warroad vs. Roseau	MSHSL Boys	Warroad Athletic Complex	BSN	Sat, 1/27	4:30 PM	Warroad 6–2
Minnesota Wild vs. Anaheim Ducks	NHL	Xcel Energy Center	BSN	Sat, 1/27	8:00 PM	Anaheim Ducks 3–2

== 2025 Hockey Day Minnesota (Valleyfair), January 22–25, 2025 ==
Hockey Day Minnesota 2025 took place at Valleyfair amusement park in Shakopee, Minnesota.

Game	Level	Location	TV	Date	Time	Result
Lakeville North vs. Rosemount	MSHSL Girls	Valleyfair	None	Wed, 1/22	5:30 PM	Rosemount 5-0
Eastview vs. Rosemount	MSHSL Boys	Valleyfair	None	Wed, 1/22	7:30 PM	Rosemount 6-3
Northfield vs. Orono	MSHSL Girls	Valleyfair	None	Thu, 1/23	3:30 PM	Orono 3-1
Eden Prairie vs. Prior Lake	MSHSL Girls	Valleyfair	None	Thu, 1/23	5:30 PM	Eden Prairie 3-2
Shakopee vs. Brainerd	MSHSL Girls	Valleyfair	None	Thu, 1/23	7:30 PM	TIE 1-1 (OT)
Orono vs. Delano	MSHSL Boys	Valleyfair	None	Fri, 1/24	3:30 PM	Delano 5-1
Prior Lake vs. Lakeville South	MSHSL Boys	Valleyfair	None	Fri, 1/24	7:30 PM	Lakeville South 6-2
Eden Prairie vs. Hibbing	MSHSL Boys	Valleyfair	FSN	Sat, 1/25	8:30 AM	Eden Prairie 4-3
University of Minnesota vs. Bemidji State	NCAA Division 1 Women's	Valleyfair	FSN	Sat, 1/25	11:30 AM	University of Minnesota 3-1
Shakopee vs. Maple Grove	MSHSL Boys	Valleyfair	FSN	Sat, 1/25	2:30 PM	Shakopee 5-1
Minnesota Wild vs. Calgary Flames	NHL	Xcel Energy Center	FSN	Sat, 1/25	6:00 PM	Calgary Flames 5-4

== 2026 Hockey Day Minnesota (Hastings), January 23–24, 2026 ==
Hockey Day Minnesota 2026 took place at United Heroes League Rink in Hastings, Minnesota.

Game	Level	Location	TV	Date	Time	Result
Rochester Century/JM vs. Rochester Mayo	MSHSL Boys	United Heroes League Rink	None	Sat, 1/17	10:00 AM	Rochester Century/JM 3-1
Lakeville South vs. Maple Grove	MSHSL Girls	United Heroes League Rink	None	Sat, 1/17	1:00 PM	Maple Grove 3-0
Wayzata vs. Rogers	MSHSL Boys	United Heroes League Rink	None	Sat, 1/17	4:00 PM	Rogers 4-2
Rosemount vs. Holy Angels	MSHSL Boys	United Heroes League Rink	None	Sat, 1/17	7:00 PM	Rosemount 6-1
Grand Rapids/Greenway vs. Alexandria	MSHSL Girls	United Heroes League Rink	None	Mon, 1/19	5:00 PM	Alexandria 4-1
Lakeville North vs. Chanhassen	MSHSL Boys	United Heroes League Rink	None	Mon, 1/19	7:30 PM	TIE 5-5 (OT)
Breck School vs. St. Paul Academy	MSHSL Boys	United Heroes League Rink	None	Tue, 1/20	7:30 PM	Breck School 10-1
Park Cottage Grove vs. White Bear Lake	MSHSL Boys	United Heroes League Rink	None	Wed, 1/21	7:30 PM	TIE 1-1 (OT)
Edina vs. Warroad	MSHSL Girls	Braemar Arena	None	Thu, 1/22	4:30 PM	Edina 2-0
Blaine vs. Champlin Park	MSHSL Boys	United Heroes League Rink	None	Thu, 1/22	7:30 PM	Blaine 9-5
Granite City Lumberjacks vs. Rochester Grizzlies	NA3HL	United Heroes League Rink	None	Fri, 1/23	12:30 PM	Granite City 7-2
Iowa Wild vs. Milwaukee Admirals	AHL	United Heroes League Rink	FSN	Fri, 1/23	5:00 PM	Milwaukee Admirals 3-2 (OT)
Hastings vs. Park Cottage Grove	MSHSL Girls	United Heroes League Rink	FSN	Sat, 1/24	9:30 AM	Hastings 2-1
Hastings vs. East Ridge	MSHSL Boys	United Heroes League Rink	FSN	Sat, 1/24	1:00 PM	East Ridge 3-1
Rock Ridge vs. Saint Thomas Academy	MSHSL Boys	United Heroes League Rink	FSN	Sat, 1/24	4:30 PM	Saint Thomas 4-1
Minnesota Wild vs. Florida Panthers	NHL	Grand Casino Arena	FSN	Sat, 1/24	8:00 PM	Florida Panthers 4-3 (OT)

== 2027 Hockey Day Minnesota (Brainerd) January, 2027 ==
Hockey Day Minnesota 2027 will take place at the Brainerd International Raceway in Brainerd Minnesota.
