= Mirabito Outdoor Classic =

2010 outdoor ice hockey game

	1	2	3	Total
Binghamton Senators	0	1	0	1
Syracuse Crunch	1	1	0	2
- Date: February 20, 2010
- Venue: New York State Fairgrounds
- City: Geddes, New York
- Attendance: 21,508

The Mirabito Outdoor Classic, also known as the 2010 AHL Outdoor Classic, was an outdoor ice hockey game played on February 20, 2010 between the Syracuse Crunch and Binghamton Senators of the American Hockey League (AHL). It was the first outdoor game in the history of the AHL as well as the first outdoor minor league hockey game. Syracuse won the game 2–1 with the help of goaltender Kevin Lalande, who stopped 36 of the 37 Binghamton shots, and Alexandre Picard, who scored the first outdoor goal in AHL history. The game was played in front of a then AHL record crowd of 21,508, on a rink constructed at the New York State Fairgrounds on a dirt auto racing track.

Crunch owner, Howard Dolgon, pursued the ideal of having his team in an outdoor game, but unlike the National Hockey League's (NHL) Winter Classic the Crunch were responsible for funding the entire event. In order to afford the cost of hosting an outdoor game sponsorship deals with several independent organizations were made including Mirabito Energy Products, which lent its name to the title of the event. In part because of his success in putting on the event, Dolgon was awarded the James C. Hendy Memorial Award as the AHL's outstanding executive. Following the success of the Mirabito Outdoor Classic other AHL Outdoor Classics were held by other AHL teams.

== Background ==
=== Planning ===
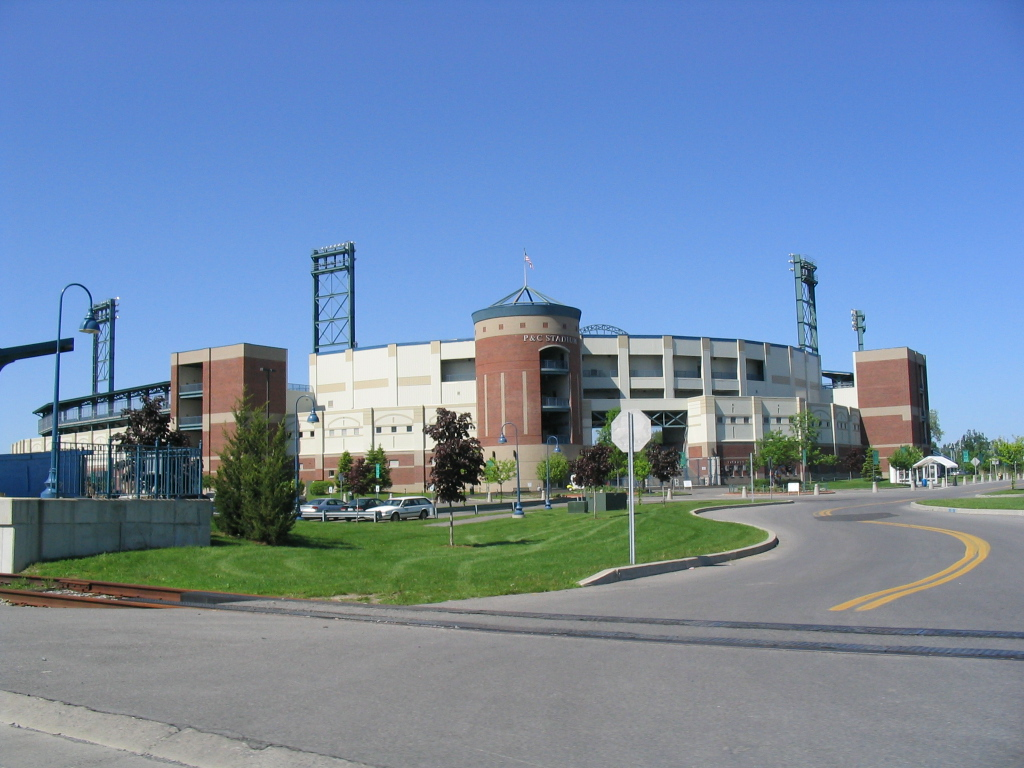
Alliance Bank Stadium was first proposed for the site of the game.

In late November 2009 Syracuse Crunch owner, Howard Dolgon began attempts to have an American Hockey League (AHL) outdoor game for his franchise. Cost estimates for hosting the game were close to $1 million. Unlike the National Hockey League's (NHL) Winter Classic, the league did not run the event, meaning the Crunch had to finance the entire project. The high cost of hosting was a reason for other franchises not pursuing outdoor games prior.

Dolgon originally wanted the game to be played at Alliance Bank Stadium in Syracuse and asked the Onondaga County Legislature to help fund the game. A proposal for the county to put in $350,000 was voted down by a 16–2 margin. After the proposal was denied, Dolgon thought the project was dead, then he received a phone call from United States Senator Charles Schumer encouraging him to go forward with the game. Schumer later stated his encouragement stemmed from the opportunity for the event to be "a national event focused on Upstate and Central New York".

With the game plans moving forward, Dolgon managed to recruit corporate sponsors to help alleviate the cost. The Crunch received $350,000 from several sponsors, including Mirabito Energy Products which lent its name to the events title. (Note: Time Warner Cable, Toyota, Labatt Blue, Coca-Cola, Dunkin' Donuts, Wynit, Renaissance Syracuse Hotel, Citgo, Hershey's and the Syracuse Conventions and Visitors Bureau were also sponsors of the event.) Mirabito decided to sponsor the event because they were opening stores in the Central New York area and wanted to establish their brand name. (Note: Mirabito Energy Products is a New York based company that sells heating oil, propane, natural gas, coal, gasoline, diesel, kerosene, and other products.) New York Governor David Paterson secured a $75,000 grant from the Empire State Development Corporation and helped the Crunch gain use of the New York State Fairgrounds free of charge. Even with the additional funding the Crunch still needed to pay upwards of $550,000.

=== Rink ===
The rink was built on the fairgrounds in front of a 15,000-seat permanent grandstand on a dirt auto racing track and leveled with what was described as "tons of granite". With demands for over the 15,000 seats occupancy of the grandstands, the Crunch rented additional temporary bleachers. Since there was no scoreboards on or near the track Syracuse rented two large video screens to show the score, time remaining, penalty times, and other information. The installation of the temporary rink cost an estimated $400,000 and took a month and a half to complete.

=== Associated events ===
As plans moved forward the decision was made not just to play the game but make it an event celebrating New York hockey history. For the game the Crunch played their intrastate rivals the Binghamton Senators. The days before the game local youth hockey teams played on the ice, and then the day after there was a pond hockey tournament played on the rink featuring 16 local teams. The fairgrounds also featured VIP tents, fan zones, bands, and ice sculpting for the celebration, as well as appearances by former players for New York's various professional teams.

== Game ==
The game was the first outdoor game in the 74-year history of the AHL and the first minor league hockey outdoor game. The attendance of 21,508 set a new AHL record surpassing the old mark of 20,672 set in 1997 at the Greensboro Coliseum. The record was later broken by subsequent Outdoor Classics. Prior to the game the 174th Fighter Wing of the New York Air National Guard performed a flyover, and recording artist Jessie James sang The Star-Spangled Banner. For the ceremonial puck drop, a skydiver delivered a puck from the National Hockey League's first foray into outdoor games from the 1991 Las Vegas exhibition game.

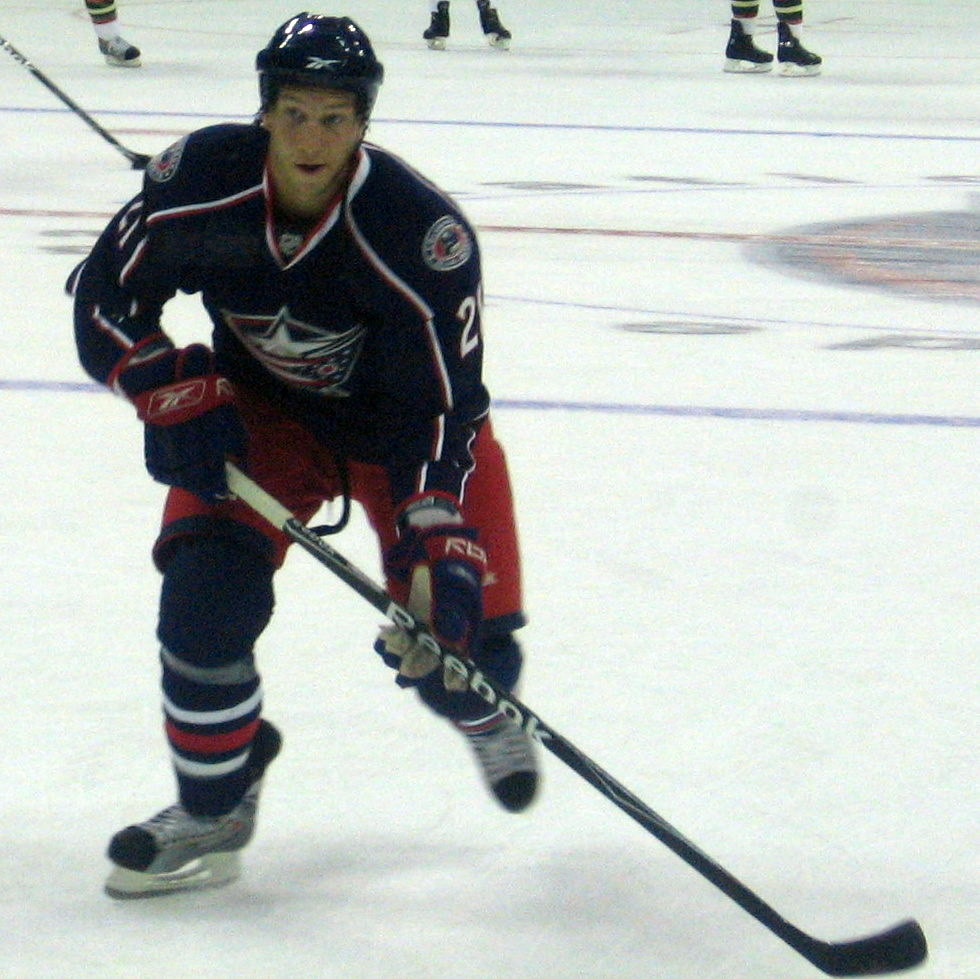
Alexandre Picard, shown here with the Columbus Blue Jackets, scored the first outdoor goal in the history of the AHL

There was a slight delay in the start of the game as some of the glass needed to be fixed. Once the game was under way it took just 1:50 before the Crunch's Jon Mirasty and the Senators' Jeremy Yablonski engaged in the first fight in Outdoor Classic history. Mirasty had previously stated that he was going to be involved in the first outdoor fight. The physical play continued and minutes later at the 3:29 mark Paul Baier and Mike Radja were given matching roughing minor penalties. Not long after the matching minors Mike Blunden made a pass to Alexandre Picard to send him on a breakaway. Picard became the first player to score in an Outdoor Classic when he beat Senators' goaltender Mike Brodeur putting the Crunch up 1–0. The score remained the same at the end of a penalty-filled first period. Eight total penalties were called on the two clubs through the first 20 minutes of the game.

Early in the second period the Crunch got another power play opportunity when Senators' captain Drew Bannister took a hooking penalty. The man advantage did not benefit Syracuse as the Senators tied the game 1–1 when Martin St. Pierre found an open Josh Hennessy, who put the puck past Kevin Lalande for the shorthanded goal. Binghamton seemed to be gaining the advantage in the second period outshooting the Crunch 16–9. But, with just 11.7 seconds remaining in the period, Crunch defenseman David Liffiton scored the go-ahead goal from the high slot. During the third period the score remained the same, when with just 1:30 left in the game Syracuse's Kevin Harvey took an interference penalty giving the Senators a chance to tie the game on the power play. Binghamton was unable to score in the first minute of the power play and pulled Brodeur to give them the six on four advantage. Even with the two man advantage the Senators failed to post a second goal on Lalande, who stopped 36 of the 37 shots he faced during the game helping the Crunch to the 2–1 victory. His performance earned him the first Star of the Game. The game was a penalty-filled affair with 26 infractions called on the two teams and a total of 18 power plays awarded. Neither team was able to capitalize on the opportunities, with Binghamton going 0–10 and Syracuse 0–8.

== Reception and legacy ==
The event was considered a success; not only did it set a new attendance record, but it also generated considerable exposure for both the Crunch and the AHL. The game was originally going to be aired just in New York by Time Warner Cable, but was picked up by the NHL Network for broadcast across Canada and the United States. The players and coaches appeared to enjoy the game as well. Crunch head coach Ross Yates stated, "it was unbelievable. It's hard to describe". Liffiton described the game as "a little taste of what it feels like to play college football" while Picard added, "I’ll do that every game for the rest of my life." AHL President Dave Andrews further noted that it made him proud to be a part of the league.

Due in part to his success in staging the event, Dolgon received the James C. Hendy Memorial Award as the AHL's outstanding executive. With the success of the Mirabito Outdoor Classic, multiple outdoor games have subsequently been held by AHL teams.

== Team rosters ==
Binghamton Senators
#	Nat.	Player	Pos.
2	(Canada)	Geoff Kinrade	D
3	(Canada)	Neil Petruic	D
5	(United States)	Paul Baier	D
7	(Canada)	Drew Bannister (C)	D
8	(Czech Republic)	Tomas Kudelka	D
9	(United States)	Josh Hennessy	LW
11	(United States)	Erik Condra	RW
16	(Canada)	Cody Bass (A)	C
18	(United States)	Brian Lee	D
19	(Canada)	Zack Smith	C
20	(Canada)	Jason Bailey	RW
24	(Canada)	Derek Smith	D
25	(Canada)	Keegan Dansereau	RW
28	(Canada)	Ryan Keller	RW
29	(Canada)	Mike Brodeur	G
31	(United States)	Chris Holt^{‡}	G
33	(Canada)	Jeremy Yablonski (A)	RW
39	(Canada)	Martin St. Pierre	C
42	(United States)	Jim O'Brien	C
43	(United States)	Brandon Svendsen	F

Syracuse Crunch
#	Nat.	Player	Pos.
2	(United States)	Dylan Reese	D
5	(Canada)	Jonathan Sigalet	D
7	(Russia)	Maksim Mayorov	RW
9	(Canada)	Brendan Bell	D
10	(Canada)	Jared Aulin	C
12	(Canada)	Mike Blunden	RW
15	(Czech Republic)	Tomas Kana	C
17	(Canada)	Kevin Harvey	LW
21	(Canada)	Alexandre Picard (A)	LW
22	(Canada)	Nick Holden	D
24	(Canada)	Derek MacKenzie (C)	C
25	(United States)	Mike Radja	C
27	(United States)	Jordan LaVallee-Smotherman	LW
30	(Canada)	Dan LaCosta^{‡}	G
38	(Canada)	Kevin Lalande	G
39	(United States)	Trevor Frischmon (A)	C
41	(Canada)	Jon Mirasty	LW
44	(Canada)	Grant Clitsome	D
48	(Canada)	David Liffiton	D
49	(United States)	Dan Fritsche	C

‡: Holt and LaCosta dressed as the back-up goaltenders and did not enter the game.

=== Coaches ===
Binghamton:
Head coach: Don Nachbaur
Assistant coach: Mike Busniuk
Syracuse:
Head coach: Ross Yates
Assistant coach: Trent Cull
Assistant coach: Karl Goehring

=== Officials ===
- Referee — Terry Koharski
- Linesmen — Dan Murphy, Tim Kotyra

Source:AHL Box Score

== Game summary ==
February 20, 2010	Binghamton Senators	1–2	Syracuse Crunch	New York State Fairgrounds	Recap

Scoring summary
Period	Team	Goal	Assist(s)	Time	Score
1st	SYR	Alexandre Picard (15)	Mike Blunden (8)	06:47	1–0 SYR
2nd	BGN	Josh Hennessy (19) – sh	Martin St. Pierre (31)	05:09	1–1
2nd	SYR	David Liffiton (4)	Dan Fritsche (4) and Mike Blunden (9)	19:48	2–1 SYR
3rd	None				

Number in parentheses represents the player's total in goals or assists to that point of the season

Penalty summary
Period	Team	Player	Penalty	Time	PIM
1st	BGN	Jeremy Yablonski	Fighting – major	01:50	5:00
1st	SYR	Jon Mirasty	Fighting – major	01:50	5:00
1st	BGN	Paul Baier	Roughing	03:29	2:00
1st	SYR	Mike Radja	Roughing	3:29	2:00
1st	BGN	Zack Smith	Hooking	4:33	2:00
1st	SYR	Maksim Mayorov	Elbowing	07:07	2:00
1st	BGN	Brandon Svendsen	Holding the stick	10:20	2:00
1st	SYR	Nick Holden	Interference	15:21	2:00
2nd	SYR	Dylan Reese	Holding	01:14	2:00
2nd	BGN	Drew Bannister	Hooking	04:21	2:00
2nd	SYR	Trevor Frischmon	Boarding	06:59	2:00
2nd	BGN	Brian Lee	Interference	08:07	2:00
2nd	SYR	Maksim Mayorov	Embellishment	08:07	2:00
2nd	BGN	Brandon Svendsen	Hooking	10:10	2:00
2nd	BGN	Erik Condra	Hooking	10:28	2:00
2nd	SYR	Jared Aulin	Hooking	11:03	2:00
2nd	BGN	Josh Hennessy	Slashing	12:50	2:00
2nd	SYR	David Liffiton	Slashing	12:50	2:00
2nd	SYR	Maksim Mayorov	Hooking	13:02	2:00
2nd	SYR	David Liffiton	Cross-checking	17:43	2:00
3rd	SYR	Derek MacKenzie	Slashing	04:15	2:00
3rd	BGN	Cody Bass	Tripping	7:29	2:00
3rd	BGN	Zach Smith	Interference	10:57	2:00
3rd	SYR	Mike Radja	Hooking	13:50	2:00
3rd	BGN	Jim O'Brien	Tripping	14:36	2:00
3rd	SYR	Kevin Harvey	Interference	18:30	2:00

Shots

Period	1st	2nd	3rd	Total
Binghamton	9	16	12	37
Syracuse	11	9	10	30

Power play opportunities

	Goals/Opportunities
Binghamton	0/10
Syracuse	0/8

Three star selections

	Team	Player	Statistics
1st	SYR	Kevin Lalande	36 Saves (.973)
2nd	SYR	Alexandre Picard	1 goal
3rd	SYR	David Liffiton	1 goal

Source:AHL Box Score

== See also ==
- List of outdoor ice hockey games
