= AHL Outdoor Classic =

Ice hockey game

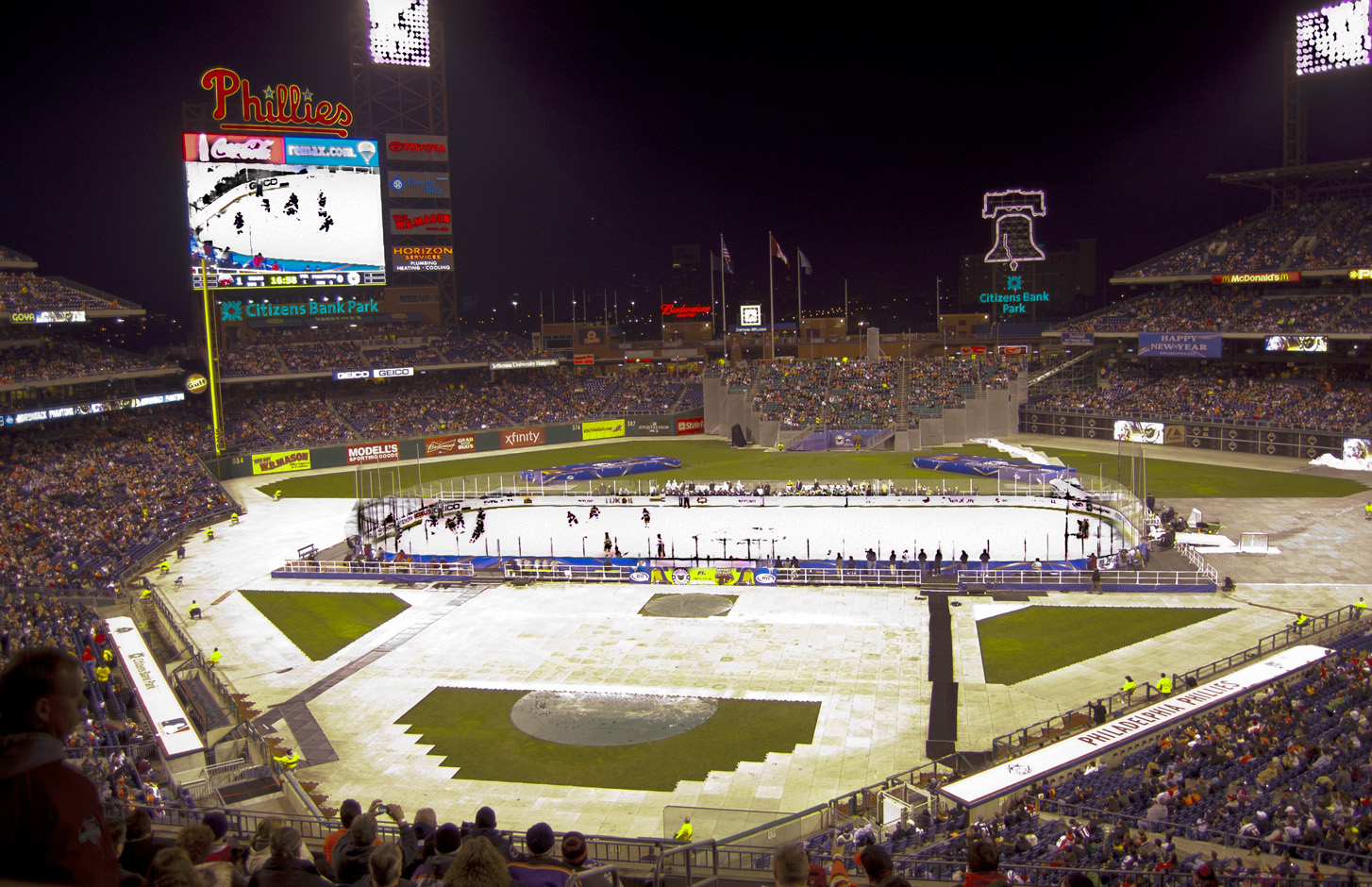
- Citizens Bank Park during the 2012 Outdoor Classic

American Hockey League
- First played: February 20, 2010
- Times held: 13
- Teams participated: 19
- Most wins: 2: Adirondack/Lehigh Valley Phantoms, Toronto Marlies
- Most recent: January 23, 2026
- Most recent winner: Milwaukee Admirals
- Next game: TBD

Teams in the American Hockey League first hosted games outdoors in 2010. Paralleling the National Hockey League's Winter Classic and Heritage Classic, these outdoor games frequently pit two regional rivals in a game in an outdoor venue. In as much as the games have carried a unified brand (most have been independently named and organized), the most commonly used name for these events has been the Outdoor Classic.

== History ==
=== 2009–10 ===
The Mirabito Outdoor Classic was the first-ever outdoor hockey game in the 74-year history of the American Hockey League (AHL) as well as the first minor league outdoor game. The game was put on by the Syracuse Crunch and played at the New York State Fairgrounds in Syracuse, New York. The game took place on February 20, 2010, with the Crunch beating the Binghamton Senators, 2–1. The game set an AHL attendance record with 21,508 fans in attendance. The title sponsor of the game was Mirabito Energy Products with other prime sponsors including Time Warner Cable, Toyota, Labatt Blue, Coca-Cola, Dunkin' Donuts, Wynit, the Syracuse Convention and Visitors Bureau and the Renaissance Syracuse Hotel.

=== 2010–11 ===
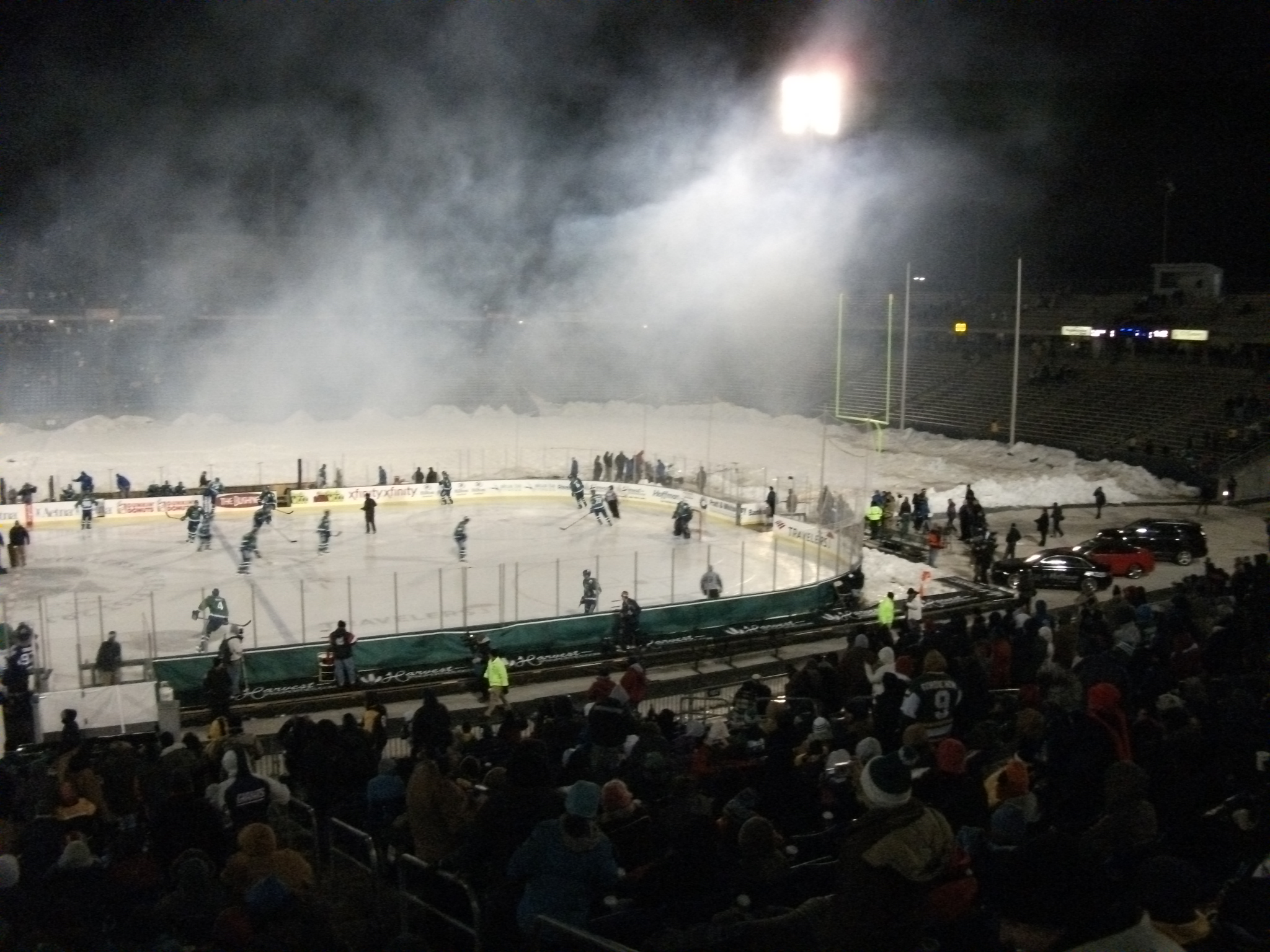
The February 2011 Whale Bowl game

The second outdoor AHL game, known as the Whale Bowl, was held between the Providence Bruins and the recently re-christened Connecticut Whale on February 19, 2011, at Rentschler Field in East Hartford. The game was held one day before the NHL's 2011 Heritage Classic and Hockey Day in America celebrations, and took place as part of USA Hockey's Hockey Weekend Across America promotions. The Whale Bowl was a highlight of a multiple-day "Whalers Hockey Fest" organized by the Whale in honor of the former Hartford Whalers; prior to the game, two other hockey games were held on the outdoor surface, including a college hockey game between Atlantic Hockey Association rivals Army Black Knights and American International College (Army won 4–1), as well as an exhibition between alumni of the Boston Bruins and Hartford Whalers (which ended in a 4–4 tie) which drew 10,000 fans.

Announced attendance for the AHL game was 21,673, but due to extreme cold only 15,234 fans showed up at the stadium to see the game. Providence defeated the Whale in a shootout, 5–4.

=== 2011–12 ===
AHL teams scheduled two outdoor games for the 2011–12 season, one in the United States and another in Canada (a first for the series).

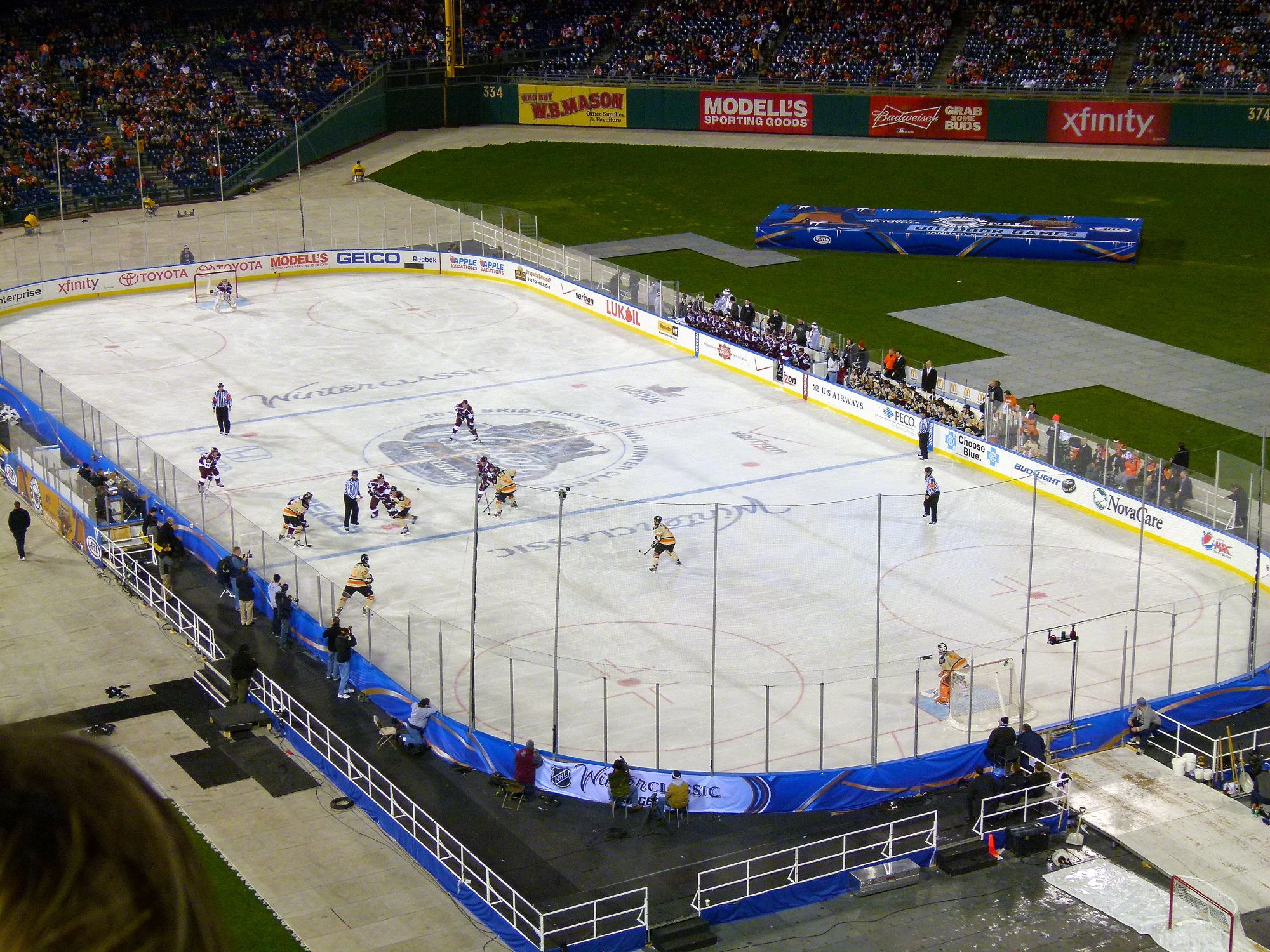
2012 AHL Outdoor Classic in Philadelphia

The first of the two was played on January 6, 2012 at Citizens Bank Park in Philadelphia, Pennsylvania. The Adirondack Phantoms (who previously played in Philadelphia and are the top affiliate for the Philadelphia Flyers), faced the Hershey Bears (themselves a former Flyers farm club). The Phantoms scored with 20.8 seconds left in regulation to send it to overtime before Shane Harper scored 58 seconds into overtime giving the Phantoms a 4–3 victory. The game was held in conjunction with the 2012 NHL Winter Classic, which took place at the same venue four days prior. The game set an AHL attendance record with 45,653 fans attending, more than double the previous record.

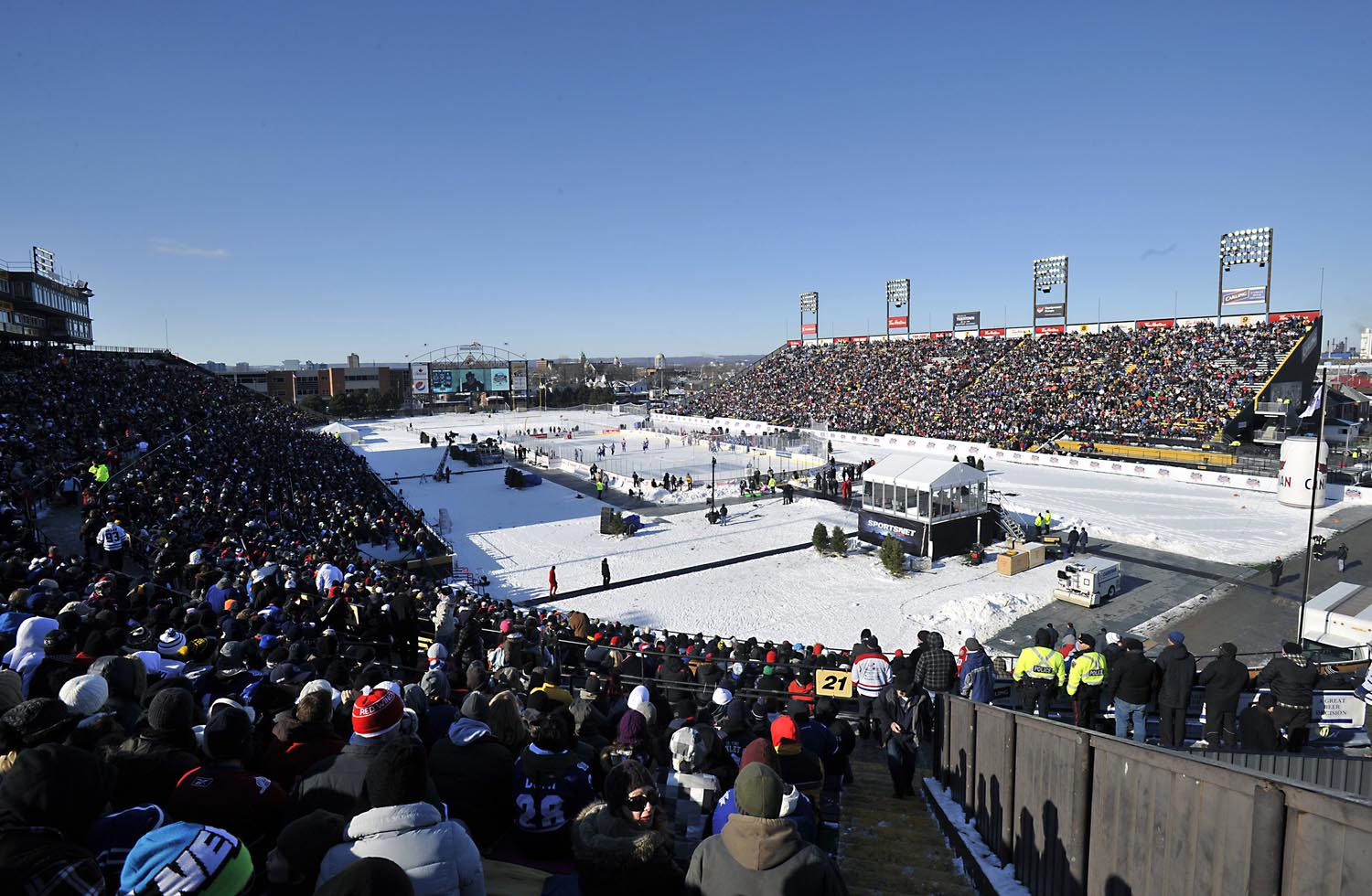
Steeltown Showdown

Another outdoor game was held at Ivor Wynne Stadium in Hamilton, Ontario, which featured a match-up between the Toronto Marlies and the Hamilton Bulldogs, on January 21, 2012. A crowd of 20,565 spectators watched the Marlies beat the Bulldogs, 7–2. Included in the festivities were two college hockey games hosted by the Brock Badgers: a men's test against the Waterloo Warriors and a women's contest against the University of Ontario Institute of Technology Ridgebacks. The event was known as the Steeltown Showdown in reference to Hamilton's steel mills.

=== 2012–13 ===
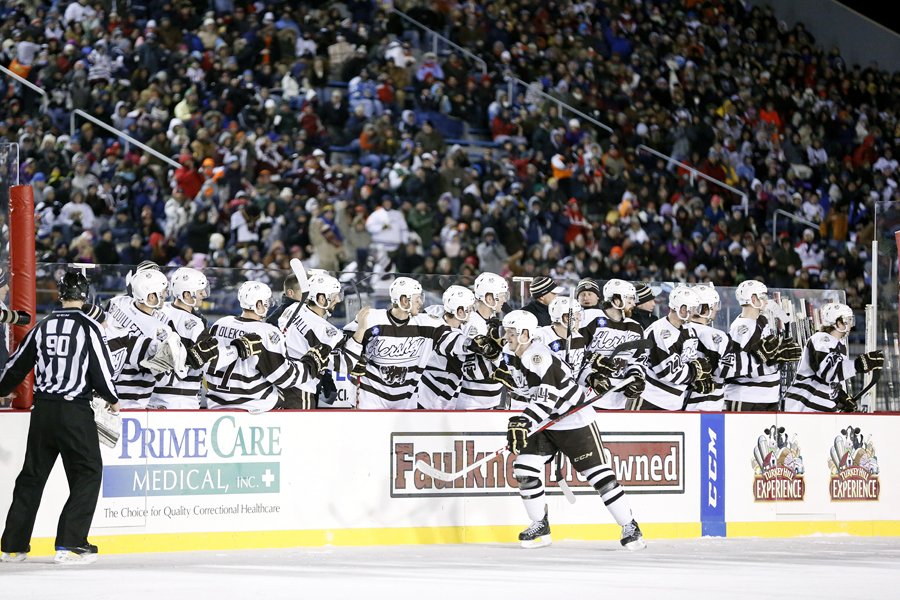
Capital BlueCross AHL Outdoor Classic

On March 24, 2012, the AHL and the Hershey Bears announced via Twitter that the Wilkes-Barre/Scranton Penguins and the Hershey Bears were to play the Capital BlueCross AHL Outdoor Classic on January 20, 2013. The game was played at Hersheypark Stadium in Hershey, Pennsylvania. Hershey took the lead in the second period but the Penguins scored a goal in the third to send the game to overtime. Paul Thompson would score in overtime, winning the game 2–1 for the Penguins. The game was played before a crowd of 17,311 spectators.

As a result of the 2012–13 NHL lockout, a second planned outdoor game between the Grand Rapids Griffins and Toronto Marlies, to be held in Detroit's Comerica Park on December 30, 2012, as part of the NHL Winter Classic, was moved indoors to Grand Rapids' Van Andel Arena as a regular-season game for the Griffins.

=== 2013–14 ===
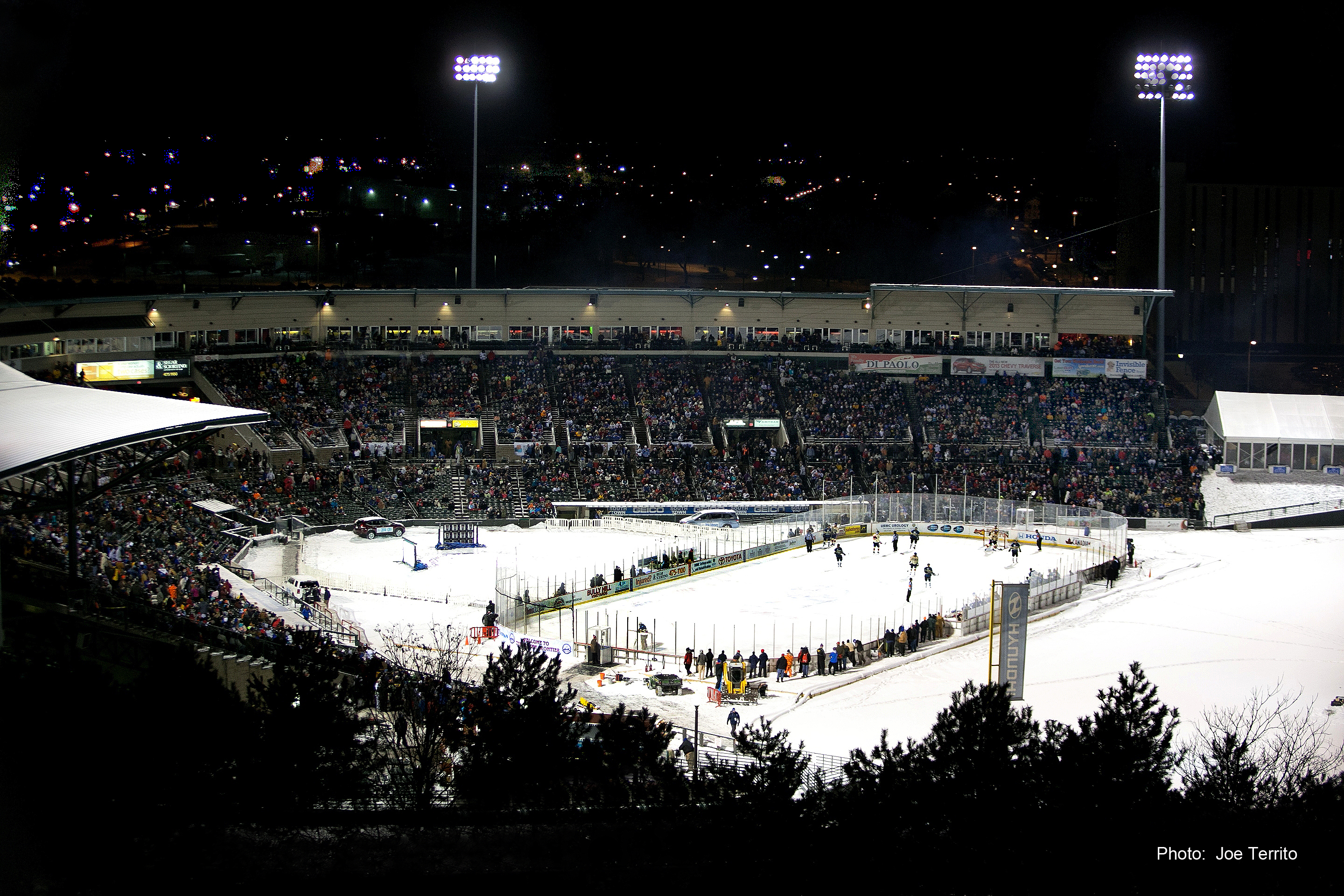
2013 Frozen Frontier

The Rochester Americans hosted the Frozen Frontier on December 13, 2013, taking on the Lake Erie Monsters at Frontier Field. The game kicked off a 10-day festival that included college hockey games hosted by the Rochester Institute of Technology men's and women's teams, high school hockey contests, and a matchup between Americans alumni and the Buffalo Sabres Alumni Hockey Team. The Americans announced their participation on March 21, 2013. Each team wore throwback uniforms for the event, with the Monsters donning a jersey worn by their predecessors, the Cleveland Barons.

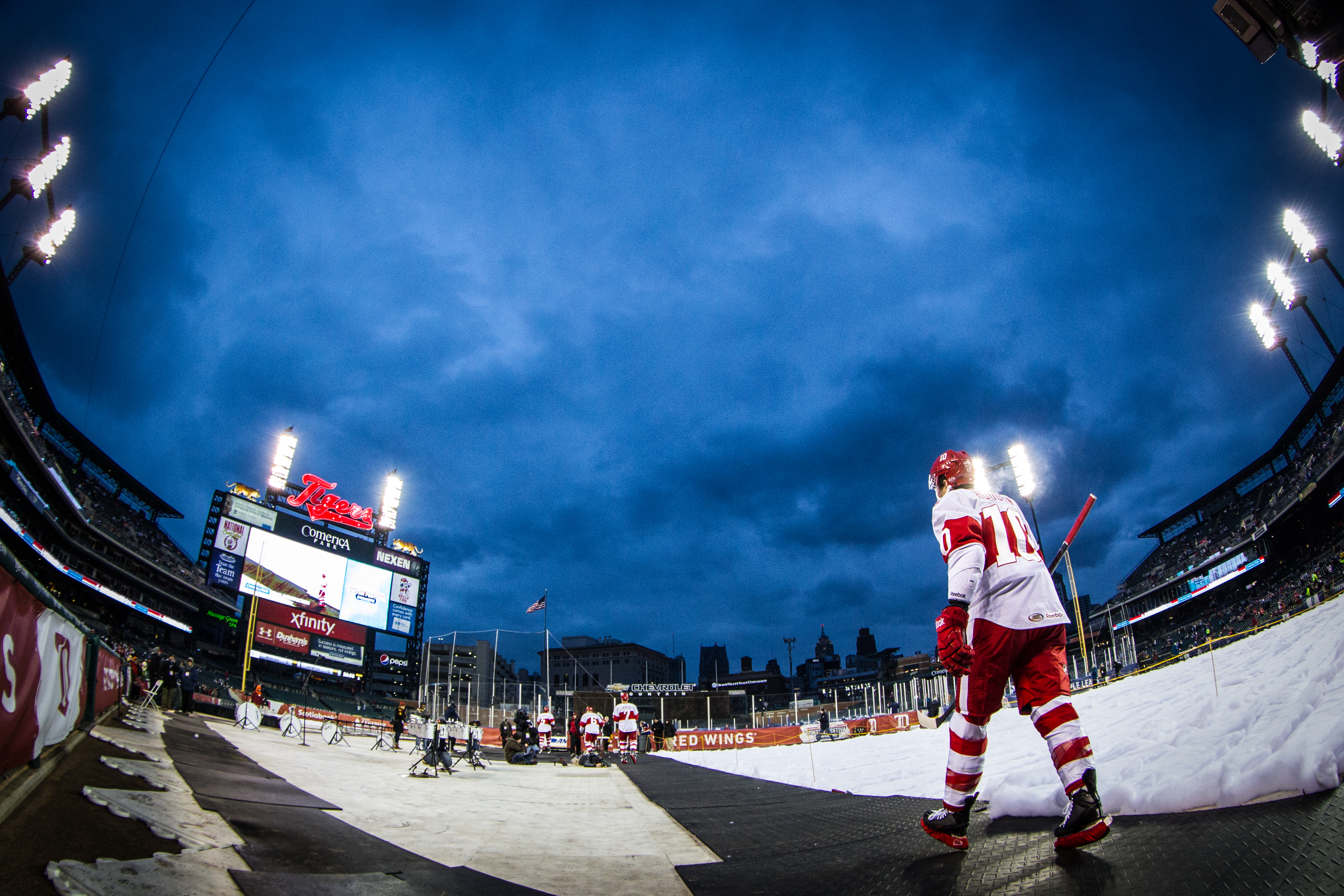
AHL game during the Hockeytown Winter Festival

One year after their game had been originally scheduled, the Grand Rapids Griffins hosted the Toronto Marlies at Comerica Park in Detroit on December 30, 2013, as part of the Hockeytown Winter Festival leading up to the 2014 NHL Winter Classic. The Marlies won in a shootout, 4–3, to become the first team ever to win two AHL outdoor games.

=== 2014–15 ===
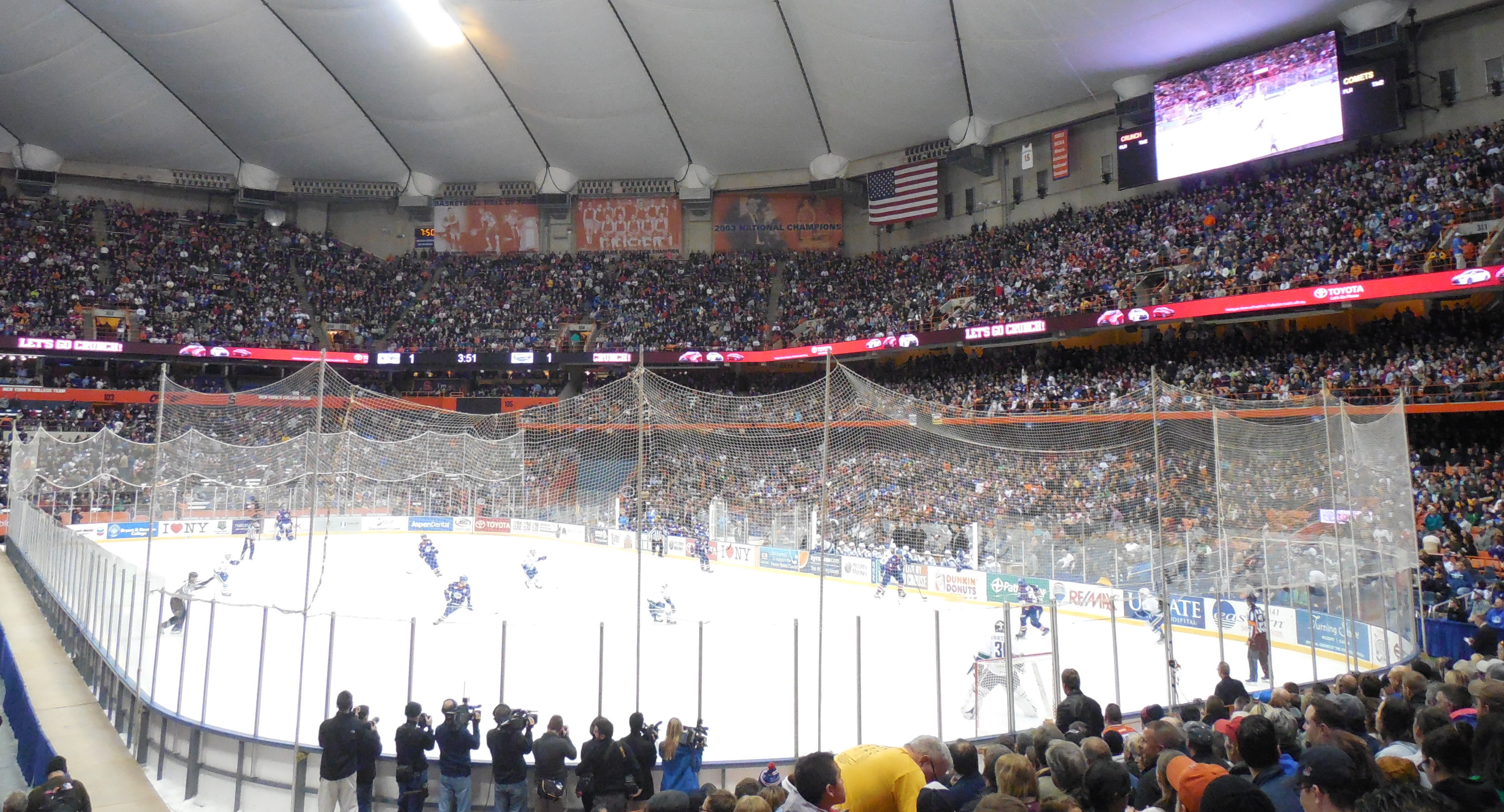
Toyota Frozen Dome Classic

In lieu of an outdoor game, the stadium showcase for the 2014–15 season was the Toyota Frozen Dome Classic, which was hosted by the Syracuse Crunch on November 22, 2014. The game was played at the Carrier Dome on the campus of Syracuse University and featured the Crunch defeating the Utica Comets 2–1 in front of 30,175 fans, an indoor attendance record for professional hockey in the United States.

=== 2015–16 ===
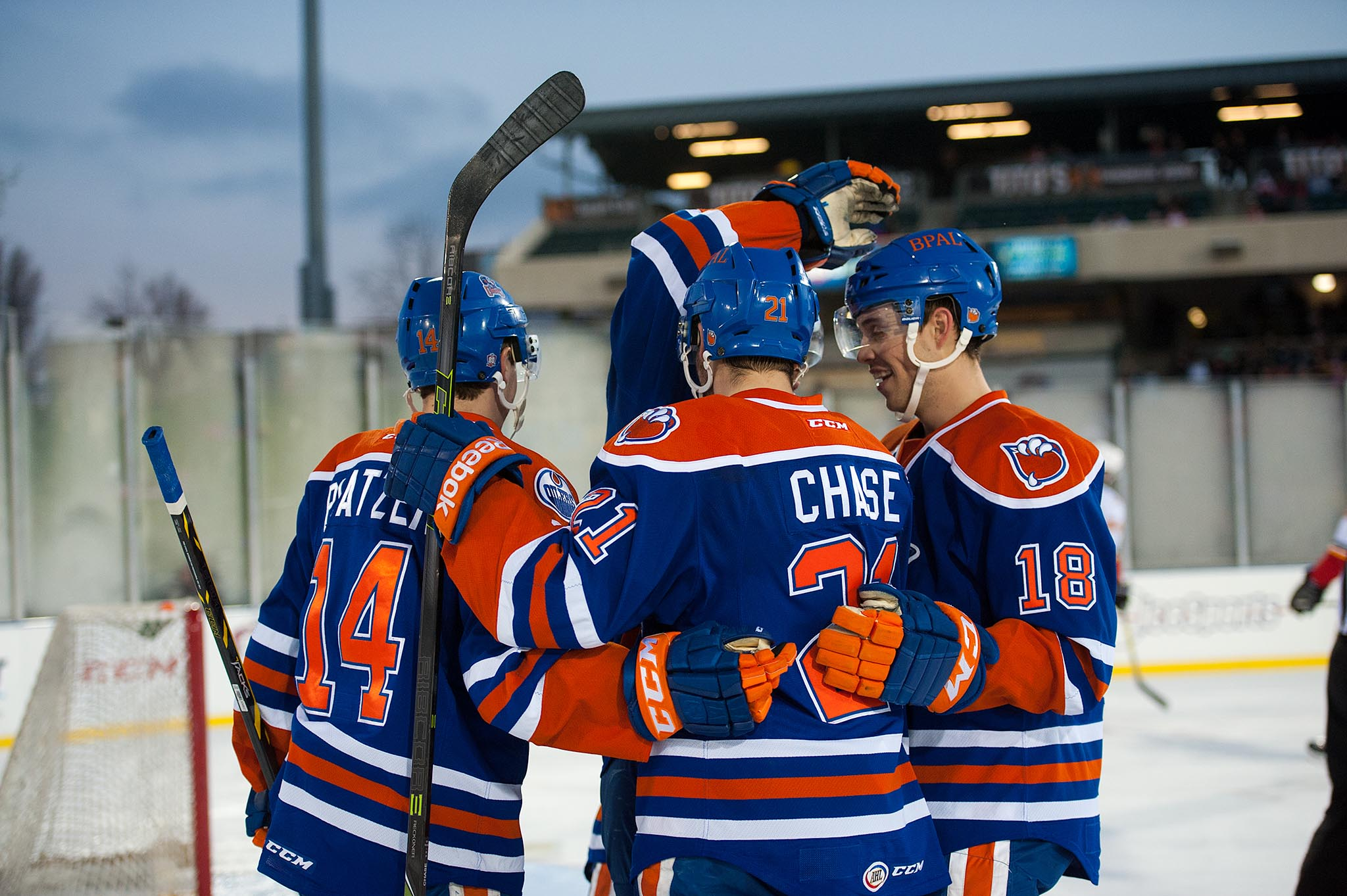
December 2015 Golden State Hockey Rush

On December 19, 2015, the Stockton Heat hosted the Bakersfield Condors in an outdoor game called the Golden State Hockey Rush at Raley Field in West Sacramento, California. Stockton defeated Bakersfield 3–2 in front of 9,357 fans. The game was originally scheduled for December 18 but was postponed due to rain.

=== 2016–17 ===
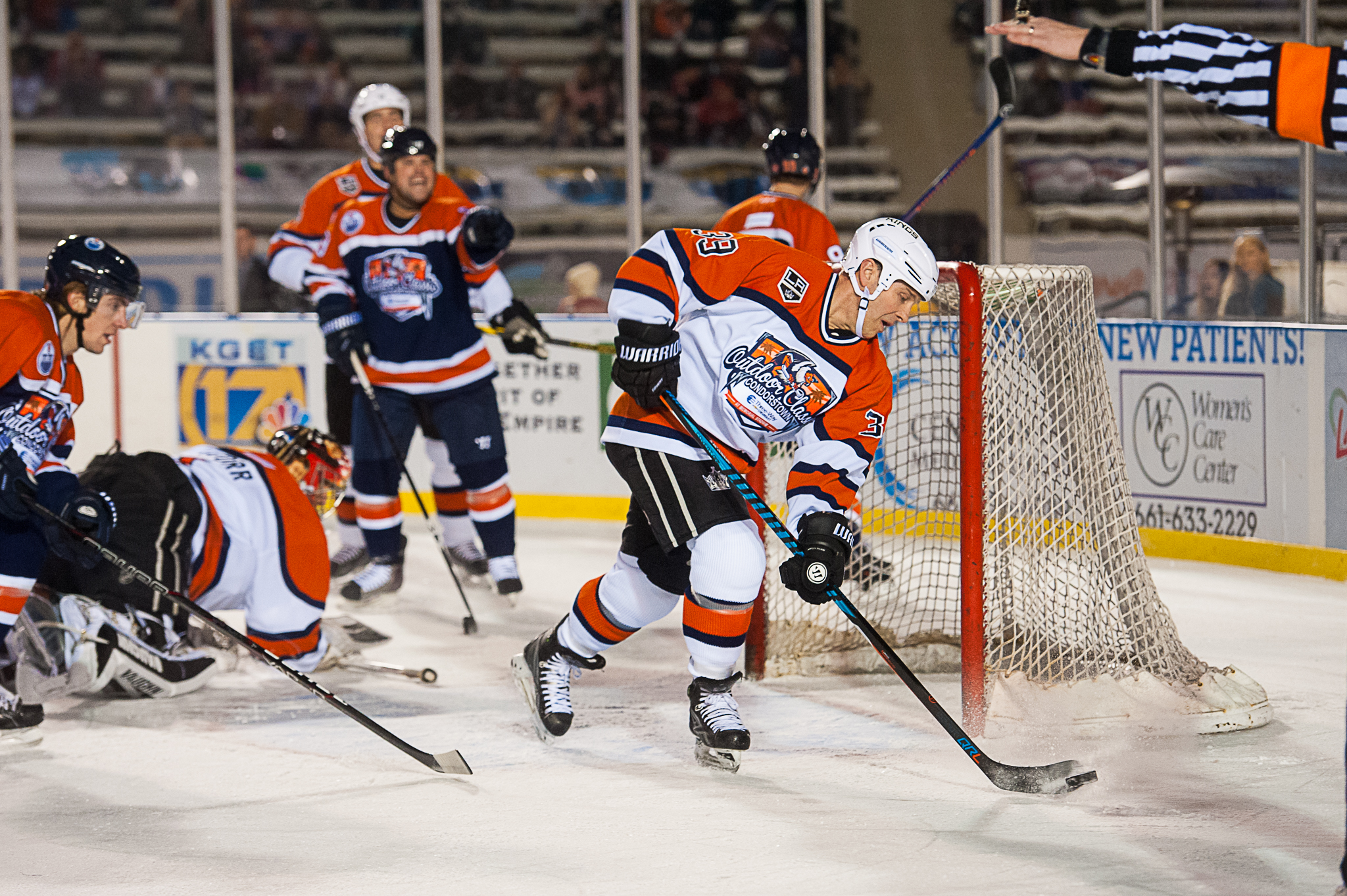
Condorstown Outdoor Classic

For the second consecutive season the AHL played an outdoor game in California. The Bakersfield Condors hosted the Ontario Reign on January 7, 2017, at Bakersfield College's Memorial Stadium in the Condorstown Outdoor Classic. The game went on as scheduled despite the sometimes steady rain, which caused puddles to cover the ice. The Condors went on to defeat the Reign 3–2 in overtime.

=== 2017–18 ===
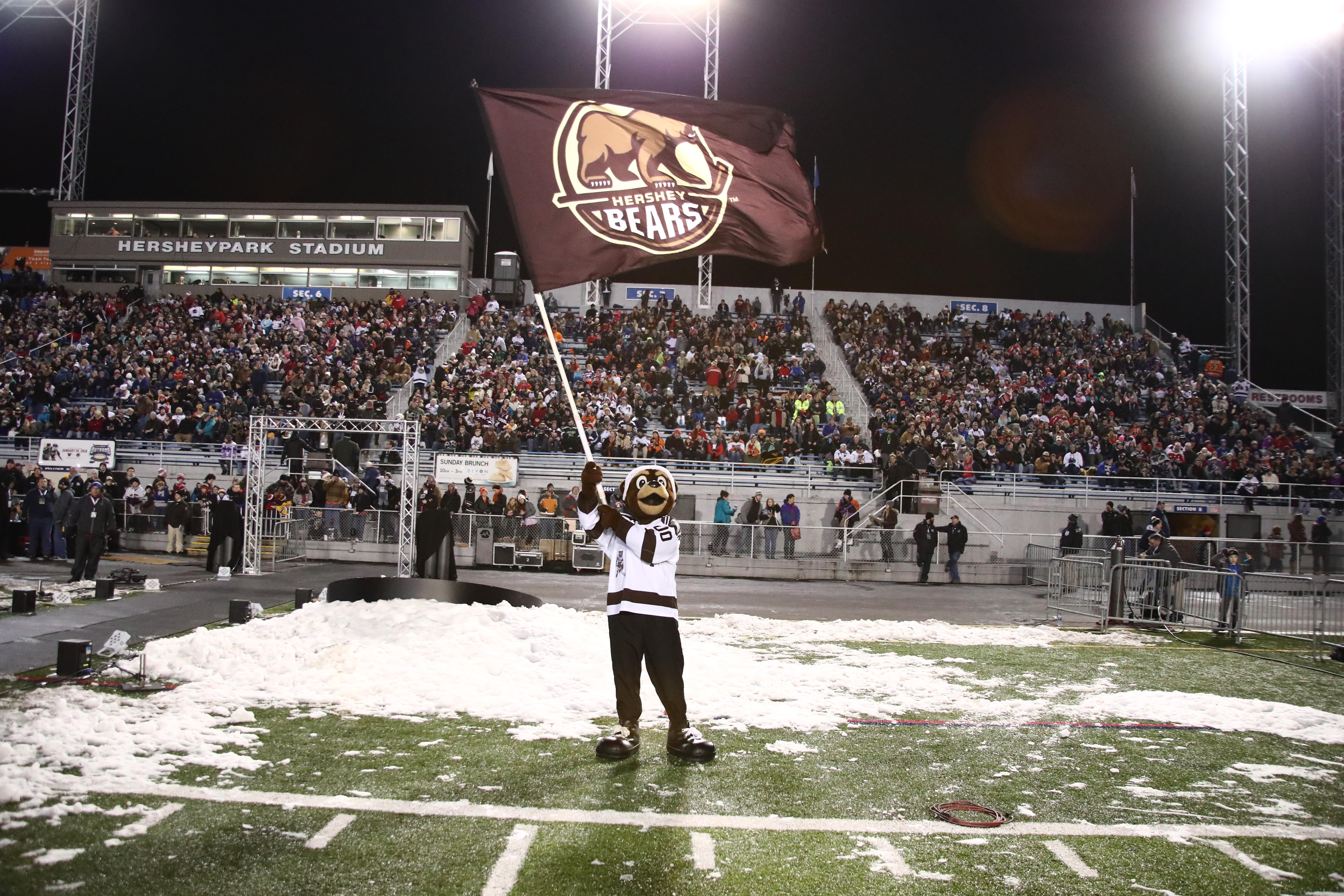
Capital Blue Outdoor Classic

The 2018 Capital Blue Outdoor Classic was hosted by the Hershey Bears as part of their 80th anniversary season. The game was held on January 20, 2018, at Hersheypark Stadium against the Lehigh Valley Phantoms. Alex Lyon made 41 saves as the Phantoms defeated the Bears, 5-2, in front of 13,091 fans.

A second outdoor event, in conjunction with the NHL 100 Classic, was also reportedly under consideration with the recently transplanted Belleville Senators potentially hosting the event at TD Place Stadium at Lansdowne Park, but did not materialize.

=== 2020–21 ===
After two seasons without an outdoor game, the Utica Comets planned to host the AIS Empire State Classic between the Comets and the Syracuse Crunch on February 13, 2021. The game would have been played at the Griffiss Business & Technology Park in Rome, New York. However, the game was canceled due to the delayed start to the 2020–21 AHL season due to the COVID-19 pandemic; the game was never rescheduled.

=== 2022–23 ===
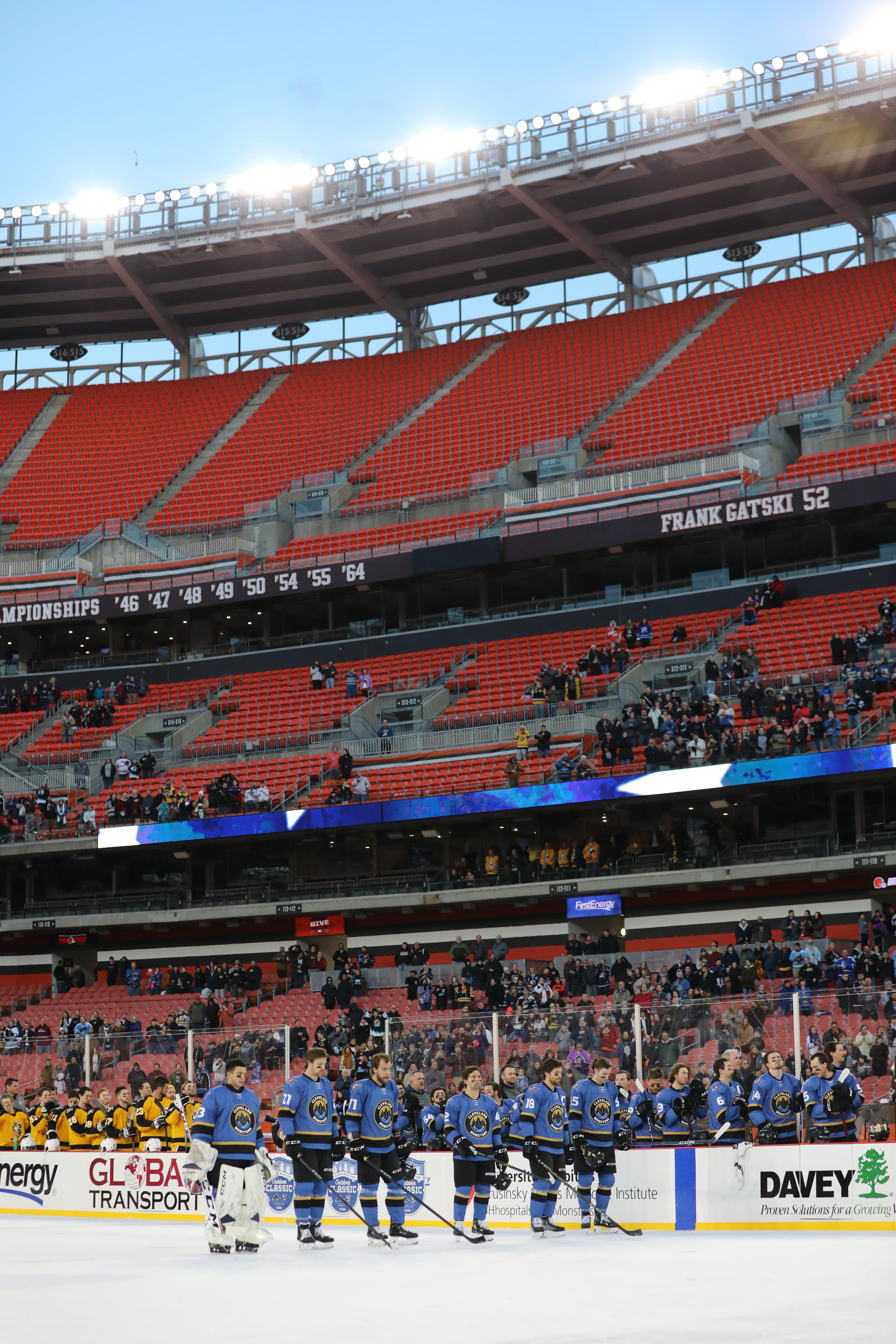
2023 outdoor game

On March 4, 2023, the Cleveland Monsters hosted the Cleveland Monsters Outdoor Classic at Cleveland Browns Stadium against the Wilkes-Barre/Scranton Penguins. The game was scheduled for 1:00 p.m., but the start was delayed until 6:00 p.m. due to unsafe ice conditions caused by increased sunshine throughout the morning.

The Monsters went on to defeat the Wilkes-Barre/Scranton Penguins 3–2 in overtime. Official attendance was 22,875, the third-largest in league history, with several thousand fans still in attendance following the five-hour delay.

=== 2023–24 ===
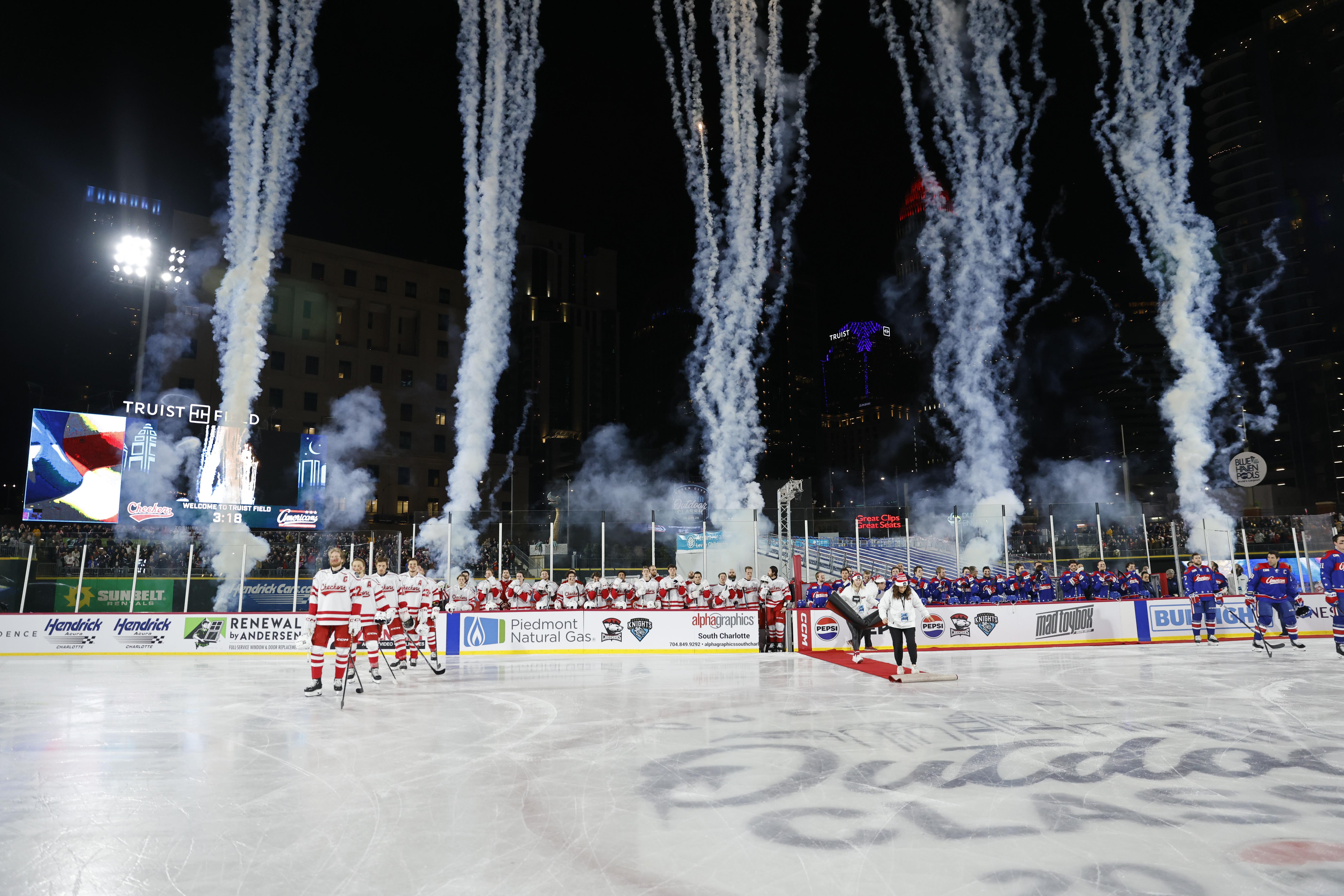
fireworks during the performance of The Star-Spangled Banner ahead of the 2024 outdoor game

On January 13, 2024, Truist Field in Charlotte, North Carolina hosted the Queen City Outdoor Classic between the Charlotte Checkers and the Rochester Americans. In both the first outdoor game for the Checkers and first outdoor hockey game in Charlotte, the Checkers defeated the Americans 5–2.

=== 2025–26 ===
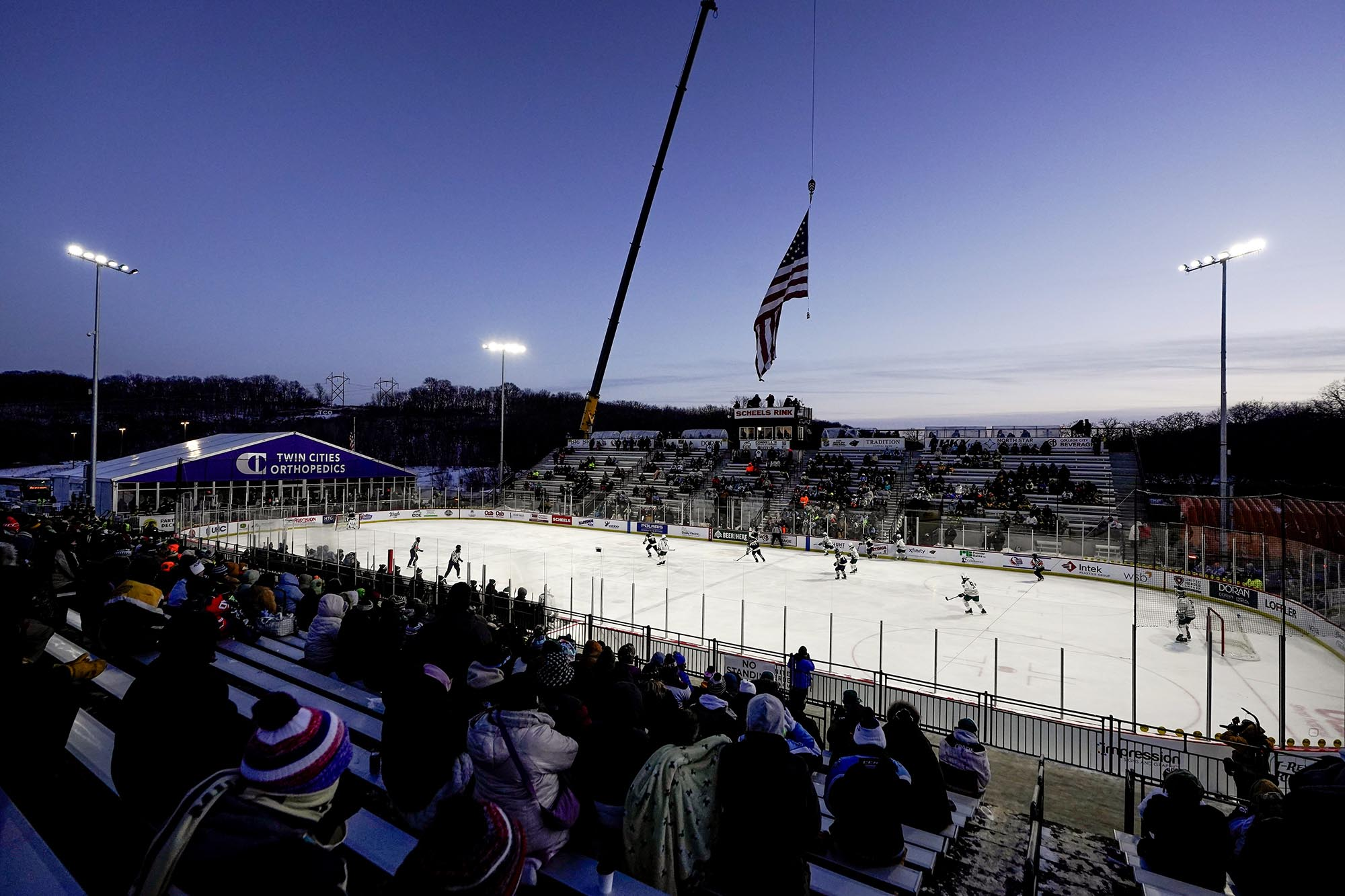
2026 outdoor game

On January 23, 2026, the Milwaukee Admirals defeated the Iowa Wild 3–2 in a game held in Hastings, Minnesota as a part of the 2026 Hockey Day Minnesota festivities. Taking place amid the January 2026 North American winter storm, it was the coldest hockey game in either NHL or AHL history, at −8 °F (−22 °C), beating the previous record held by the 2022 NHL Winter Classic. Attendance for the game (held in a 5,500 capacity stadium) was 4,608.

== List of AHL outdoor games ==
Bolded teams denote winners

Date	Site	Away team	Home team	Score	Attendance
February 20, 2010	New York State Fairgrounds; Syracuse, New York	Binghamton Senators	**Syracuse Crunch**	1–2	21,508
February 19, 2011	Rentschler Field; East Hartford, Connecticut	**Providence Bruins**	Connecticut Whale	5–4 (SO)	21,673
January 6, 2012	Citizens Bank Park; Philadelphia, Pennsylvania	Hershey Bears	**Adirondack Phantoms**	3–4 (OT)	45,653
January 21, 2012	Ivor Wynne Stadium; Hamilton, Ontario	**Toronto Marlies**	Hamilton Bulldogs	7–2	20,565
January 20, 2013	Hersheypark Stadium; Hershey, Pennsylvania	**Wilkes-Barre/Scranton Penguins**	Hershey Bears	2–1 (OT)	17,311
December 13, 2013	Frontier Field; Rochester, New York	Lake Erie Monsters	**Rochester Americans**	4–5 (SO)	11,015
December 30, 2013	Comerica Park; Detroit, Michigan	**Toronto Marlies**	Grand Rapids Griffins	4–3 (SO)	20,337
December 19, 2015	Raley Field; West Sacramento, California	Bakersfield Condors	**Stockton Heat**	2–3	9,357
January 7, 2017	Memorial Stadium; Bakersfield, California	Ontario Reign	**Bakersfield Condors**	2–3 (OT)	12,330
January 20, 2018	Hersheypark Stadium; Hershey, Pennsylvania	**Lehigh Valley Phantoms**	Hershey Bears	5–2	13,091
March 4, 2023	Cleveland Browns Stadium; Cleveland, Ohio	Wilkes-Barre/Scranton Penguins	**Cleveland Monsters**	2–3 (OT)	22,875
January 13, 2024	Truist Field; Charlotte, North Carolina	Rochester Americans	**Charlotte Checkers**	2–5	11,031
January 23, 2026	Tradition Veterans Complex; Hastings, Minnesota	**Milwaukee Admirals**	Iowa Wild	3–2 (OT)	4,608

== See also ==
- NHL Heritage Classic
- NHL Winter Classic
- List of outdoor ice hockey games
