= Kevin Lalande =

Canadian-Belarusian ice hockey player

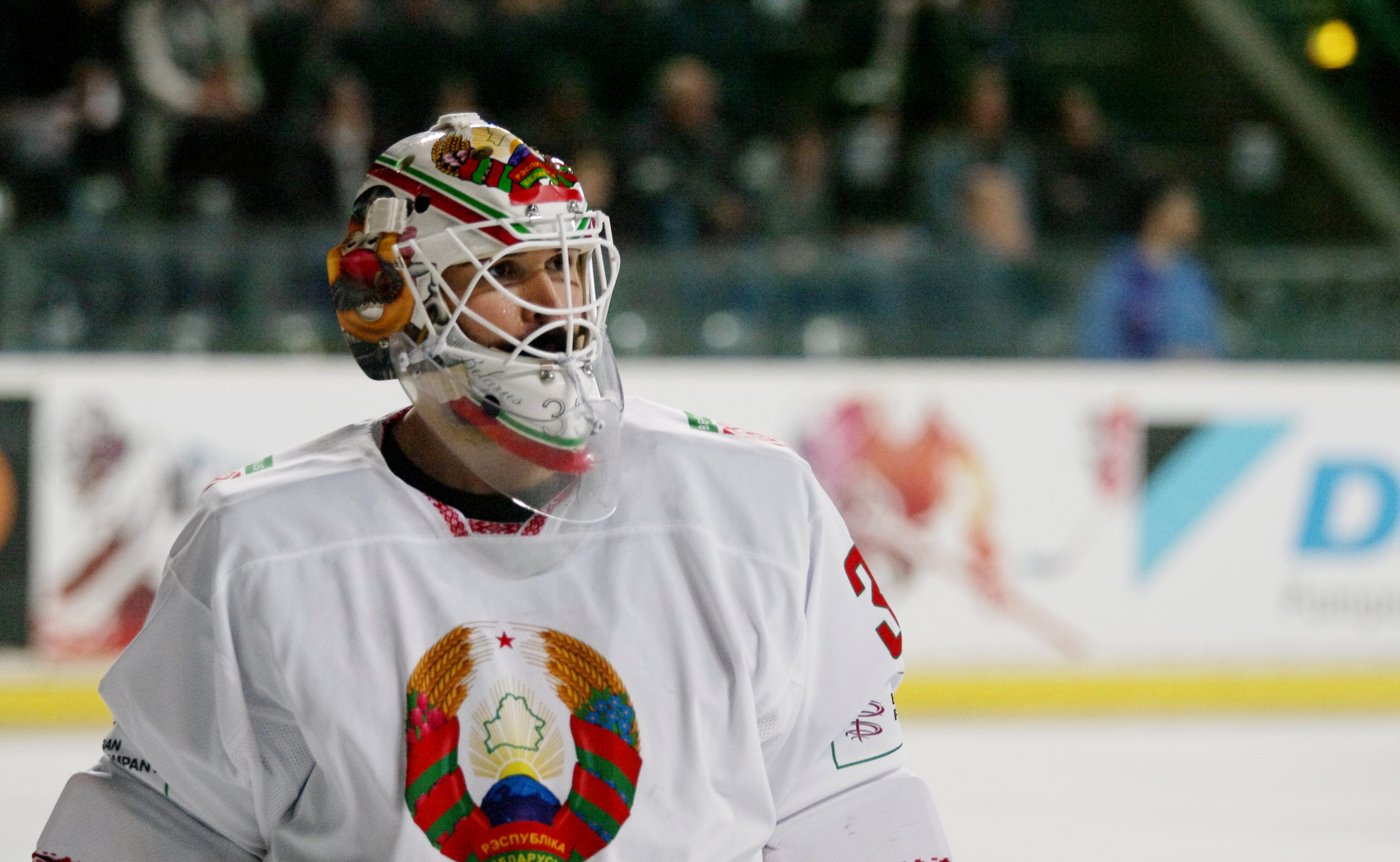
- Lalande with Belarus during the 2017 IIHF World Championship
- Born: February 19, 1987 (age 39) Kingston, Ontario, Canada
- Height: 6 ft 0 in (183 cm)
- Weight: 183 lb (83 kg; 13 st 1 lb)
- Position: Goaltender
- Caught: Left
- Played for: Quad City Flames; Syracuse Crunch; Vityaz Chekhov; HC Dinamo Minsk; CSKA Moscow
- National team: Belarus
- NHL draft: 128th overall, 2005; Calgary Flames
- Playing career: 2007–2017

Kevin Lalande (born February 19, 1987) is a Belarusian Canadian former professional ice hockey goaltender who most notably played in the Kontinental Hockey League (KHL) for HC Dinamo Minsk.

== Playing career ==
Lalande played junior hockey in the Ontario Hockey League for the Belleville Bulls and was drafted 128th overall by the Calgary Flames in the 2005 NHL entry draft. He joined the organization in 2007, splitting his time with the Flames' American Hockey League affiliate the Quad City Flames and their ECHL affiliate the Las Vegas Wranglers. He was traded to the Columbus Blue Jackets on March 4, 2009 and was assigned to their AHL affiliate the Syracuse Crunch. In 2010, Lalande signed with Vityaz Chekhov of the Kontinental Hockey League.

Lalande was the winning goaltender in the Mirabito Outdoor Classic, the American Hockey League's first outdoor game. He made 36 saves on 37 shots en route to a 2-1 Syracuse Crunch victory.

In 2011, Lalande decided to continue his career with HC Dinamo Minsk, also a member of Kontinental Hockey League. On February 16, 2013 Lalande accepted Belarusian citizenship.

Having suffered four concussions in the last 5 years of his 10-year professional career, Lalande ended his professional career at the age of 30 with Dinamo Minsk following the 2016–17 season.

== International play ==
In July 2014 after a successful debut as the starting goaltender of Belarus at the 2014 IIHF World Championships, Lalande signed a one-year contract with his third KHL club, HC CSKA Moscow.

Lalande returned as a goaltender for Belarus at the 2015 IIHF World Championships where Belarus lost in the Quarter-final.
