= Frozen Frontier =

2013 outdoor hockey event held in Rochester, New York, USA

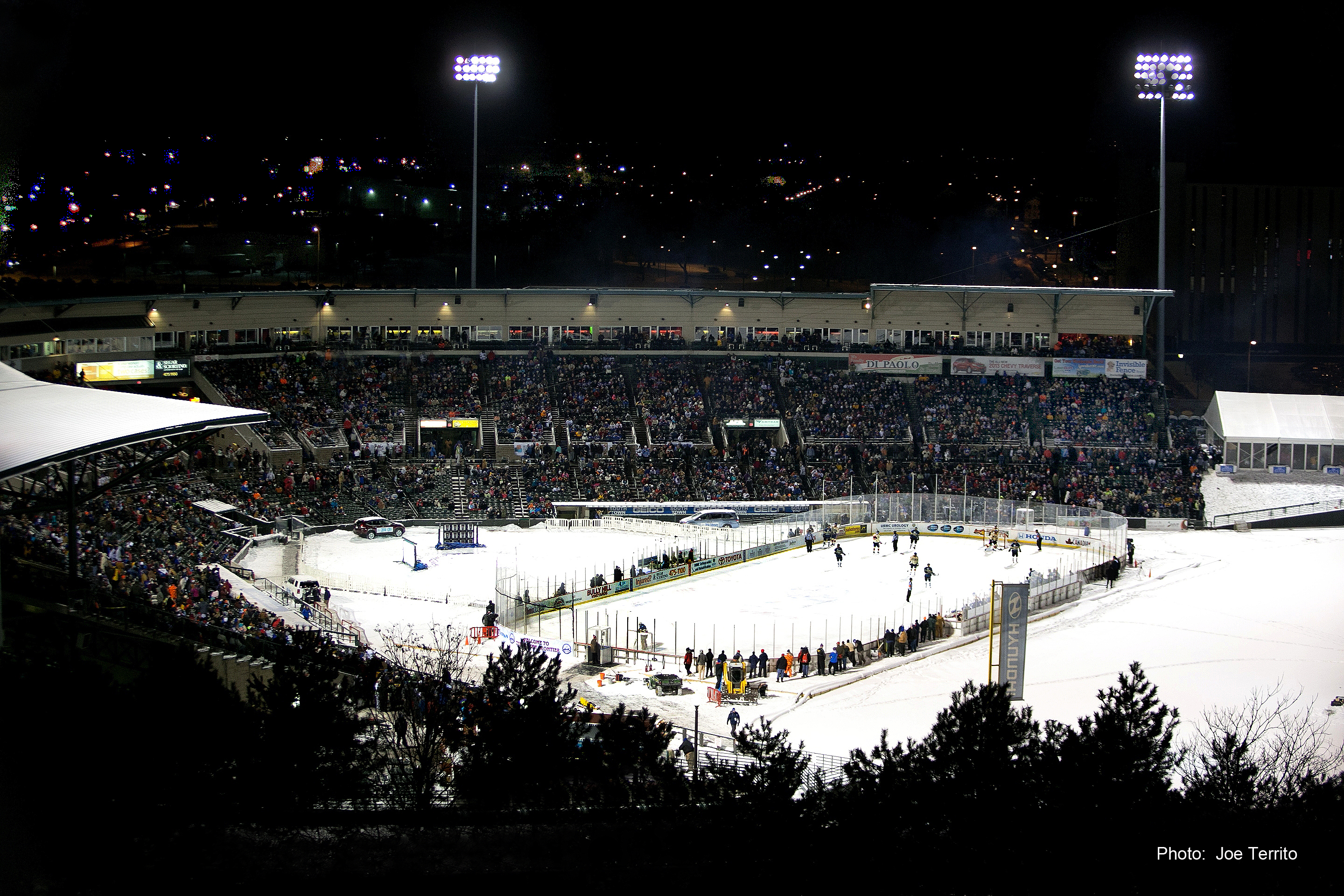
AHL game during event

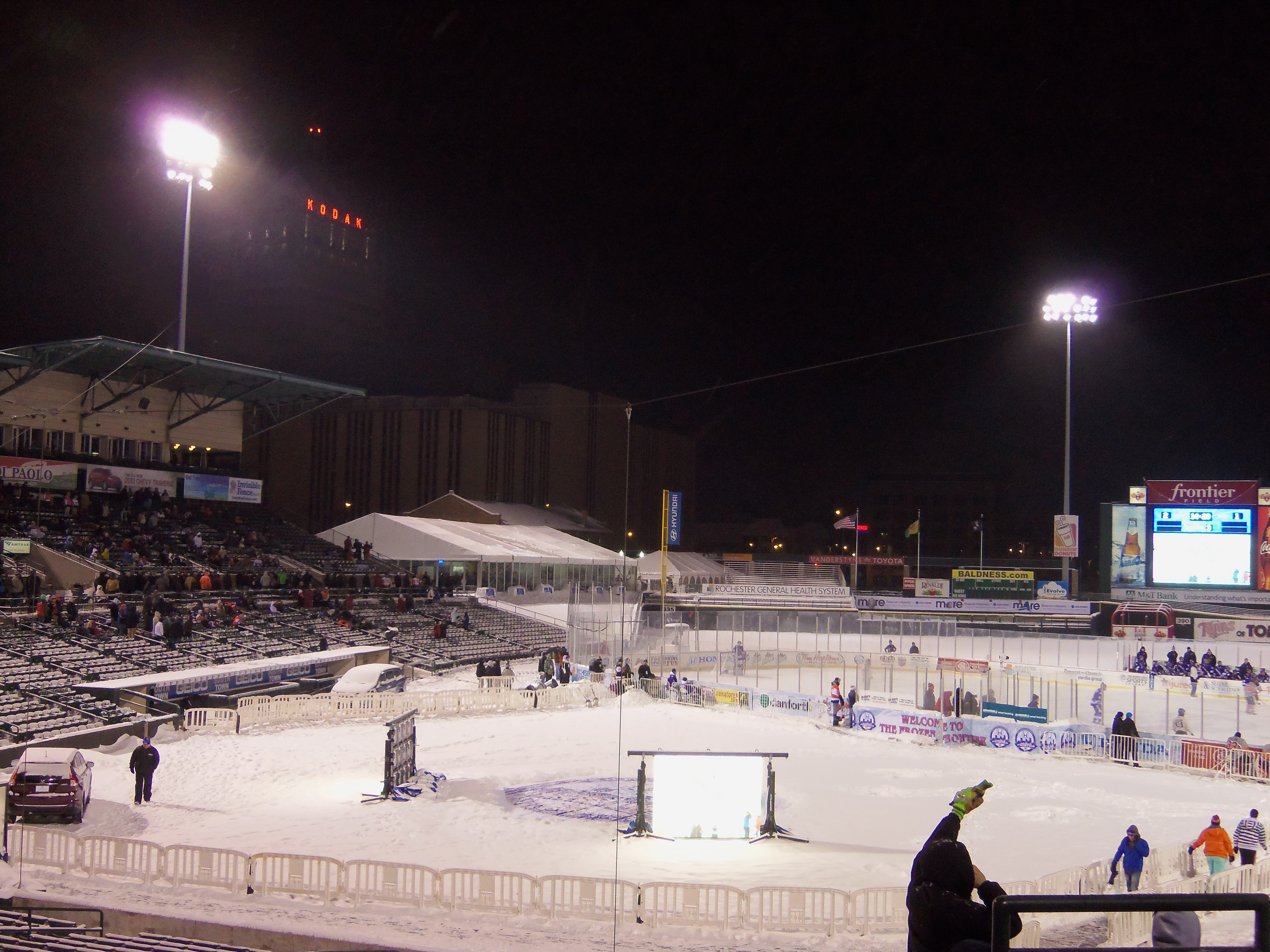
stadium on December 14

Frozen Frontier (officially Greater Rochester Area Honda Dealers Frozen Frontier presented by Labatt) was a multi-day outdoor ice hockey event in December 2013 in Rochester, New York. An ice rink was erected in the infield of Frontier Field, a baseball stadium.

Events included:

- December 13 — The 2013-14 AHL Outdoor Classic: Rochester Americans vs. Lake Erie Monsters
- December 14 — RIT Tigers (women) vs. Clarkson Golden Knights (women) / RIT Tigers (men) vs. Niagara Purple Eagles (men)
- December 15 — Nazareth Golden Flyers vs. Geneseo Knights / Buffalo Junior Sabres vs. St. Michael's Buzzers / Rochester Americans alumni vs. Buffalo Sabres alumni
- December 21 & 22 — High school ice hockey games
