= Kevin Harvey (ice hockey) =

Canadian ice hockey player

- Born: September 14, 1984 (age 41) Hamilton, Ontario, Canada
- Height: 6 ft 2 in (188 cm)
- Weight: 196 lb (89 kg; 14 st 0 lb)
- Position: Left wing
- Shot: Left
- AIHL team Former teams: Sydney Ice Dogs; Syracuse Crunch; Springfield Falcons; HC Slovan Bratislava; Coventry Blaze
- NHL draft: 270th overall, 2003; Calgary Flames
- Playing career: 2006–2020

Kevin Harvey (born September 14, 1984) is a Canadian professional ice hockey winger playing for the Sydney Ice Dogs of the Australian Ice Hockey League (AIHL).

== Career ==
Harvey was selected by the Calgary Flames in the ninth round (270th overall) of the 2003 NHL entry draft. He has previously played for the Syracuse Crunch and the Springfield Falcons in the American Hockey League before playing abroad with HC Slovan Bratislava in the Slovak Extraliga.

After the 2013–14 season which he split between English club, Coventry Blaze of the Elite Ice Hockey League and the Rapid City Rush of the Central Hockey League, Harvey returned to sign with his fourth ECHL club, the Evansville IceMen on August 13, 2014. Midway through the season Harvey lead the league with 17 major penalties and was traded on February 2, 2015, to the Rapid City Rush in exchange for future considerations.

Harvey joined the Sydney Ice Dogs in Australia's AIHL on May 15, 2015, on a one-year contract for the 2015 season.

== Career statistics ==
			Regular season					Playoffs
Season	Team	League	GP	G	A	Pts	PIM	GP	G	A	Pts	PIM
1999–2000	St. George Dukes	SOJHL
2000–01	Kingston Voyageurs	OPJHL	11	2	2	4	36	—	—	—	—	—
2000–01	Oakville Blades	OPJHL	28	7	5	12	188	—	—	—	—	—
2001–02	Oakville Blades	OPJHL	30	5	17	22	221	—	—	—	—	—
2001–02	Kingston Frontenacs	OHL	2	0	1	1	0	—	—	—	—	—
2002–03	Oakville Blades	OPJHL	19	7	15	22	127	—	—	—	—	—
2002–03	Georgetown Raiders	OPJHL	16	4	9	13	34	24	6	11	17	91
2003–04	Owen Sound Attack	OHL	59	8	8	16	159	7	1	1	2	2
2004–05	Georgetown Raiders	OPJHL	42	30	35	65	163	15	8	6	14	106
2006–07	New Mexico Scorpions	CHL	58	5	6	11	226	18	1	1	2	71
2007–08	New Mexico Scorpions	CHL	51	8	10	18	256	6	3	0	3	26
2008–09	Reading Royals	ECHL	23	3	7	10	122	—	—	—	—	—
2008–09	Syracuse Crunch	AHL	54	6	5	11	214	—	—	—	—	—
2009–10	Syracuse Crunch	AHL	63	5	7	12	265	—	—	—	—	—
2010–11	Rapid City Rush	CHL	37	4	4	8	194	13	3	3	6	31
2010–11	Springfield Falcons	AHL	9	0	0	0	16	—	—	—	—	—
2011–12	Toledo Walleye	ECHL	11	0	1	1	44	—	—	—	—	—
2011–12	Elmira Jackals	ECHL	23	3	7	10	95	—	—	—	—	—
2011–12	HC Slovan Bratislava	SVK	8	1	0	1	96	16	2	2	4	45
2012–13	Elmira Jackals	ECHL	53	12	19	31	191	6	0	0	0	23
2013–14	Coventry Blaze	GBR	31	14	13	27	261	—	—	—	—	—
2013–14	Rapid City Rush	CHL	27	3	10	13	78	7	1	0	1	11
2014–15	Evansville Icemen	ECHL	41	7	11	18	187	—	—	—	—	—
2014–15	Rapid City Rush	ECHL	29	7	8	15	86	13	1	2	3	21
2014–15	Sydney Ice Dogs	AUS	10	2	8	10	91	—	—	—	—	—
2015–16	Sydney Ice Dogs	AUS	7	2	7	9	43	—	—	—	—	—
2016–17	Dundas Real McCoys	ACH	7	0	2	2	18	3	2	0	2	10
2016–17	Sydney Ice Dogs	AUS	1	0	0	0	0	—	—	—	—	—
2019–20	Dundas Real McCoys	ACH	19	4	8	12	51	2	0	0	0	6
CHL totals			173	20	30	50	754	44	8	4	12	139
ECHL totals			180	32	53	85	725	19	1	2	3	44
AHL totals			126	11	12	23	495	—	—	—	—	—
