= Paul Baier =

American ice hockey player (born 1985)

- Born: February 2, 1985 (age 41) Summit, New Jersey, U.S.
- Height: 6 ft 4 in (193 cm)
- Weight: 225 lb (102 kg; 16 st 1 lb)
- Position: Defense
- Shot: Right
- Played for: Rochester Americans; Portland Pirates; Binghamton Senators; Hershey Bears; SG Cortina; HC Valpellice
- NHL draft: 95th overall, 2004; Los Angeles Kings
- Playing career: 2008–2014

Paul Baier (born February 2, 1985) is an American former professional ice hockey defenseman who mainly played in the American Hockey League (AHL).

== Playing career ==
Baier was drafted in the third round, 95th overall, by the Los Angeles Kings in the 2004 NHL entry draft. Before playing professional hockey, Baier attended Brown University.

Unsigned from the Kings, he participated in the Buffalo Sabres training camp before the 2008–09 season before he was released to AHL affiliate, the Portland Pirates. Following his first full professional season with the Pirates Baier was invited to the Ottawa Senators training camp on September 12, 2009, and played the 2009–10 season with AHL affiliate, the Binghamton Senators.

The following season, Baier returned to the Rochester Americans, signing a one-year contract on September 14, 2010.

Baier became a free agent for the 2011–12 season, and was signed by the Hershey Bears to a one-year AHL contract in July 2011. Subsequently, the Washington Capitals invited him to their training camp in September 2011.

However, Baier began the 2011–12 season with the Capitals' and Bears' ECHL affiliate the South Carolina Stingrays. On January 24, 2012, with only two games with the Hershey Bears, Baier was mutually released from his contract and immediately joined the Italian Serie A for the remainder of the year.

On July 29, 2013, he was signed to a one-year deal, alongside his younger brother Eric, as a free agent with the Orlando Solar Bears of the ECHL. After just 12 games with the Solar Bears, Baier announced his retirement midseason on January 23, 2014.

== Career statistics ==
			Regular season					Playoffs
Season	Team	League	GP	G	A	Pts	PIM	GP	G	A	Pts	PIM
2002–03	Deerfield Academy	HS Prep	25	2	15	17	24	—	—	—	—	—
2003–04	Deerfield Academy	HS Prep	23	6	4	10	22	—	—	—	—	—
2004–05	Brown University	ECAC	32	2	8	10	24	—	—	—	—	—
2005–06	Brown University	ECAC	30	0	6	6	18	—	—	—	—	—
2006–07	Brown University	ECAC	32	1	4	5	55	—	—	—	—	—
2007–08	Brown University	ECAC	31	2	5	7	38	—	—	—	—	—
2007–08	Rochester Americans	AHL	9	1	3	4	5	—	—	—	—	—
2008–09	Portland Pirates	AHL	62	3	8	11	67	3	0	0	0	6
2009–10	Binghamton Senators	AHL	62	2	8	10	49	—	—	—	—	—
2010–11	Rochester Americans	AHL	65	2	8	10	80	—	—	—	—	—
2011–12	South Carolina Stingrays	ECHL	39	2	6	8	40	—	—	—	—	—
2011–12	Hershey Bears	AHL	2	0	0	0	5	—	—	—	—	—
2011–12	SG Cortina	ITA	6	0	3	3	0	9	0	3	3	16
2012–13	HC Valpellice	ITA	19	2	2	4	16	5	0	2	2	4
2013–14	Orlando Solar Bears	ECHL	12	1	0	1	20	—	—	—	—	—
AHL totals			200	8	27	35	206	3	0	0	0	6
