= ESL Ballpark =

Baseball stadium in Rochester, New York

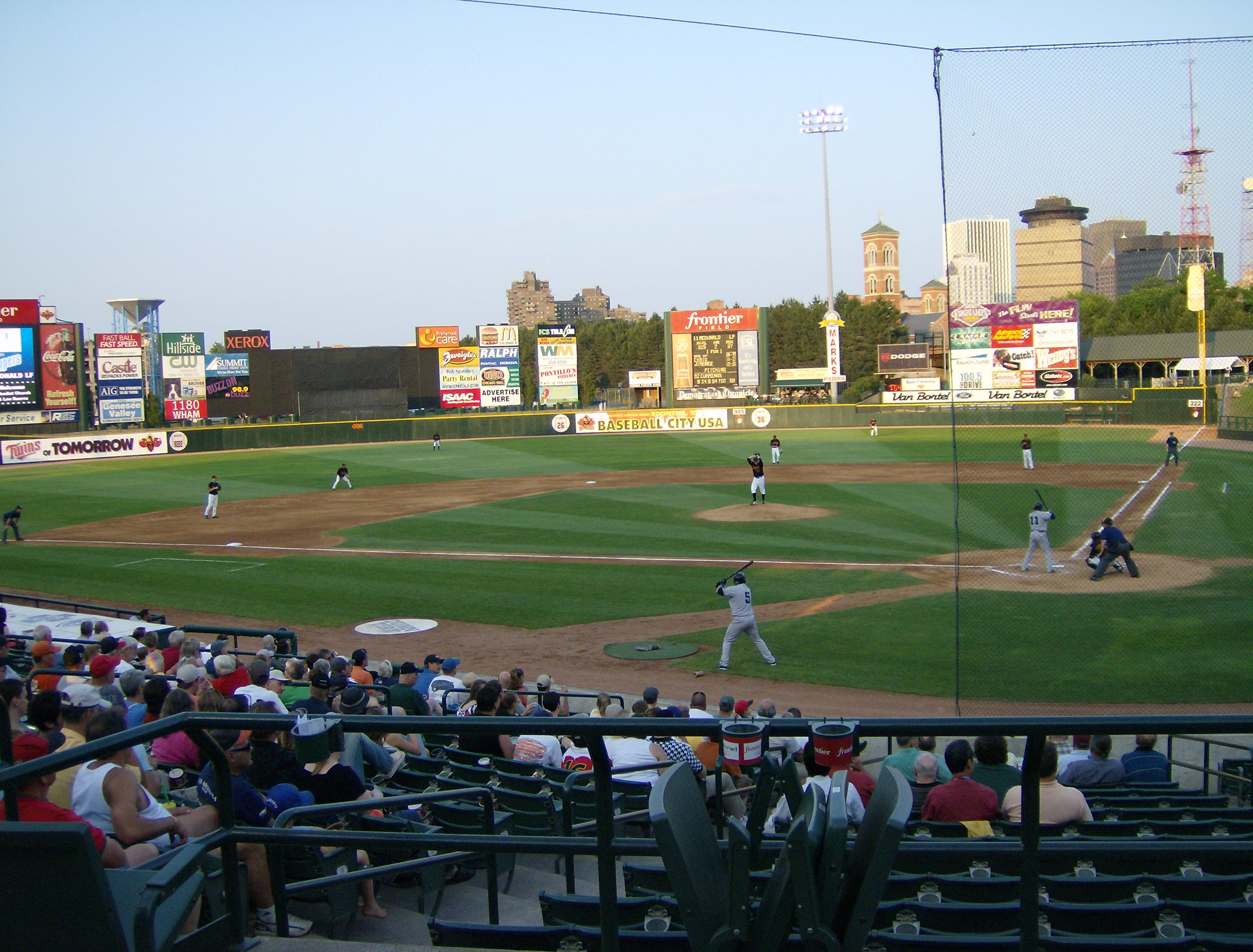

- Location within New York State Location within the United States
- Interactive map of ESL Ballpark
- Former names: Frontier Field (1996–2022); Innovative Field (2023–2026)
- Address: One Morrie Silver Way; Rochester, New York; United States
- Coordinates: 43°9′29.76″N 77°37′11.26″W
- Owner: Monroe County, New York
- Operator: Rochester Community Baseball, Inc.
- Capacity: 13,500
- Surface: Grass
- Field size: Left field: 335 ft (102 m); Center field: 402 ft (123 m); Right field: 322 ft (98 m)

Construction
- Groundbreaking: November 16, 1994
- Opened: July 11, 1996
- Cost: US$35.3 million ($72.5 million in 2025 dollars)
- Architects: Ellerbe Becket; Bergmann Associates
- Project manager: Flaum Management Company
- Structural engineer: Sear-Brown Group Inc.
- General contractor: Christa Construction Corporation

Tenants
- Rochester Raging Rhinos (USL-1) 1996–2005; Rochester Red Wings (IL/AAAE) 1997–present Rochester Rattlers (MLL) 2001–2002; Empire State Yankees (IL) 2012; Toronto Blue Jays taxi squad (MLB) 2020

ESL Ballpark (originally known as Frontier Field and later Innovative Field) is a baseball stadium at One Morrie Silver Way in downtown Rochester, New York. It has been the home of the Rochester Red Wings of the International League since 1997. The park opened in 1996, replacing Silver Stadium in northern Rochester, which had been home to professional baseball in Rochester since 1929. Although the stadium was built for baseball, ESL Ballpark has had several tenants in numerous sports, including the Rochester Raging Rhinos of the United Soccer Leagues from 1996 to 2005, and the Rochester Rattlers of Major League Lacrosse from 2001 to 2002. The ballpark seats 10,840 spectators for baseball.

Rochester-based telecommunications company Frontier Telephone of Rochester held the naming rights to the ballpark from its opening in 1996 until the 2022 baseball offseason. Originally in December 2015, an agreement was reached to maintain the name for a further ten years. However, on October 24, 2022, a new naming rights agreement was reached with Innovative Solutions, a Henrietta-based information technology firm, as Frontier was looking to cut back on sponsorship costs after its bankruptcy in 2020. The stadium was renamed Innovative Field.

On February 10, 2026, Monroe County and the Red Wings announced a new naming rights agreement with ESL Federal Credit Union, which was originally founded in 1920 by George Eastman to serve employees of Eastman Kodak.

== History ==
Ground was broken on the stadium in November 1994. The ballpark, designed by Ellerbe Becket, opened on July 11, 1996. Although it was always intended to be primarily a baseball facility, it was constructed to be able to accommodate the Rochester Rhinos soccer team as well. The Red Wings moved from Silver Stadium to Frontier Field at the conclusion of the 1996 International League season.

The first event at the ballpark was a concert by The Beach Boys on July 11, 1996. The facility also hosted the 1996 Drum Corps Associates World Championships on August 31, 1996. The first sporting event was contested the following night as the Rochester Raging Rhinos played the Montreal Impact in an American Professional Soccer League (original A-League) regular season match. Rochester won 3–2 in front of an A-League record 14,717 fans. The first baseball game at the stadium was the 1997 Rochester Red Wings home opener against the Scranton/Wilkes-Barre Red Barons on April 11, 1997. Scranton/Wilkes-Barre won 8–5. Frontier Field hosted the Triple-A All-Star Game on July 12, 2000.

The Rhinos played briefly at the University of Rochester's Fauver Stadium before moving to Frontier Field during their inaugural 1996 season. The Rhinos played at the park until 2005, when the team moved to the soccer-specific PAETEC Park (now Rochester Community Sports Complex Stadium) three blocks northwest of the ballpark. The Rochester Rattlers of Major League Lacrosse played at the stadium from 2001 to 2002, when the team moved to Bishop Kearney High School. They moved again to then-PAETEC Park in 2006.

After the Rhinos left the stadium for PAETEC Park in 2005, the Rochester Red Wings became the sole full-time tenant. As a result, the Wings made upgrades to the park to make the stadium a better baseball facility. The first notable upgrade, the installation of a new 24-foot (7.3 m) by 32-foot (9.8 m) video scoreboard in left field, was completed in time for the 2010 season. Originally, a new grass turf was to be installed following the 2006 season to replace the grass that has been beat up over the years from extensive use in baseball, soccer, and lacrosse. No such replacement was made for 2007, but work commenced following that season and a new grass surface with an improved drainage system was installed prior to the 2008 season.

Faced with a requirement of major renovations to PNC Field, the New York Yankees' Triple-A affiliate, the Scranton/Wilkes-Barre Yankees, chose to temporarily relocate their operations to Frontier Field for 2012 to allow renovations to their stadium to be completed in one season rather than being spread over two to three years. The team played half its games in Rochester, sharing the stadium with the Red Wings. While based in Rochester the team was branded as the Empire State Yankees.

In 2020, with the Triple-A baseball season cancelled due to the COVID-19 pandemic, Frontier Field hosted the Toronto Blue Jays taxi squad while the Blue Jays played at Sahlen Field in Buffalo after the government of Canada denied them permission to play at Rogers Centre for the 2020 MLB season due to pandemic restrictions.

== Events ==
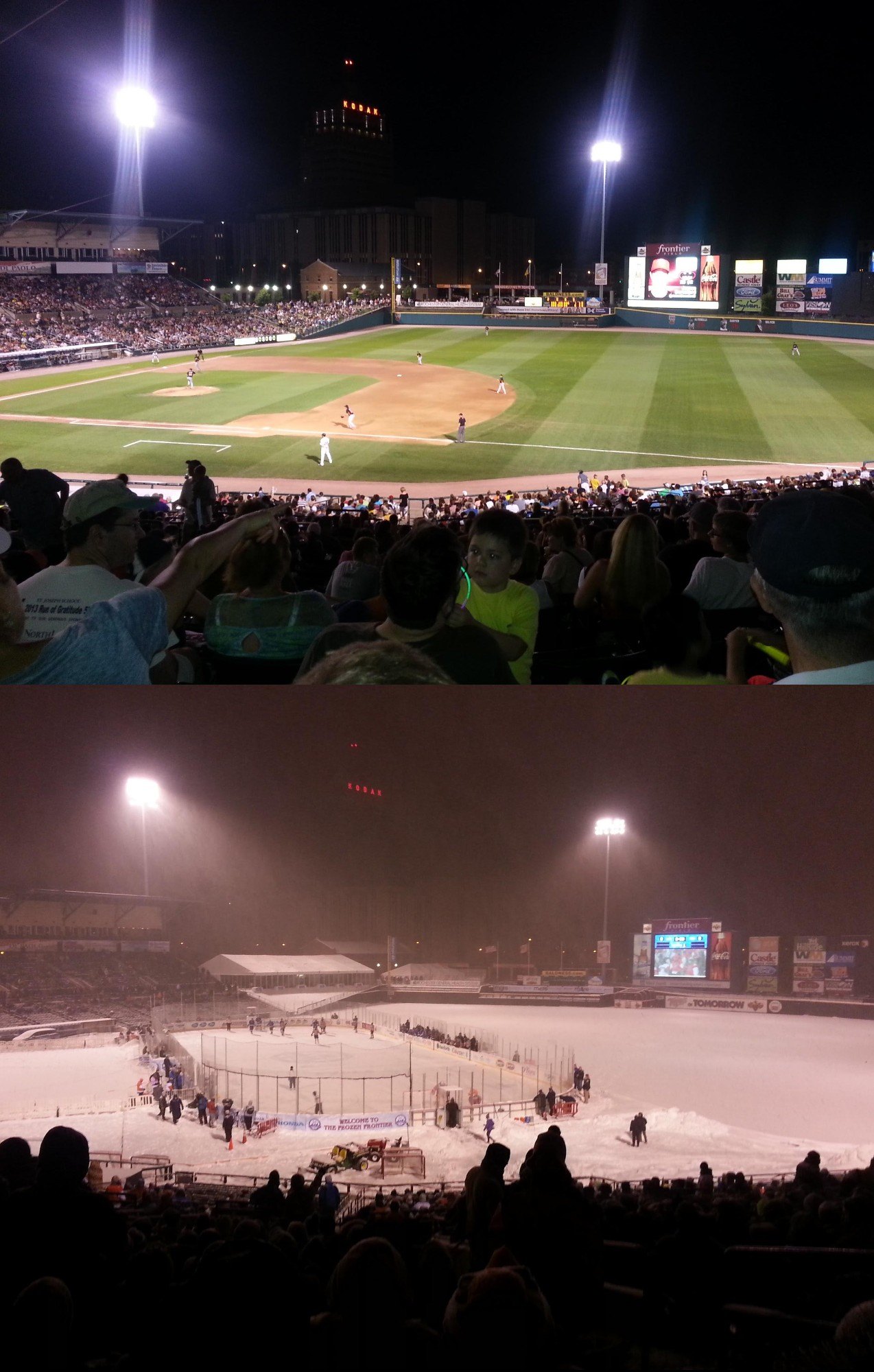
Top: Summertime Red Wings Baseball, Bottom: Wintertime RIT Tigers men's ice hockey during the 2013 Frozen Frontier event

ESL Ballpark hosted the Triple-A All-Star Game on July 12, 2000, with a sellout crowd of 12,810 on hand. The Pacific Coast League All-Stars defeated the International League All-Stars, 8–2. Rochester's Javier De La Hoya was selected as the IL MVP and Pitcher of the Game.

On July 10, 2005 Bryan Adams and Def Leppard held a concert at the facility. The stadium is the annual site of PXY Summer Jam.

In December 2013, the stadium was the host of Frozen Frontier, an outdoor hockey event. A sheet of ice was set up on the field and the Rochester Americans played the Lake Erie Monsters in an American Hockey League game. There were also collegiate and high school games.

== Attendance records ==
On May 6, 2012, a prior regular season record crowd of 13,584 fans were in attendance to witness Andy Pettitte make a start for the Scranton/Wilkes-Barre Yankees against the Pawtucket Red Sox. The game was originally supposed to be played at Dwyer Stadium in Batavia but was moved due to a high demand of tickets.

On May 18, 2013, the Pepsi Max Field of Dreams Game saw a crowd of 13,716. Local resident Johnny Perotti and his family played alongside players including Frank Thomas, Rickey Henderson, Johnny Bench, Mike Schmidt, Ozzie Smith, Reggie Jackson, and others.

On June 14, 2024, a regular season record crowd of 13,605 fans were in attendance when Gerrit Cole made a rehab start for the Scranton/Wilkes-Barre RailRiders against the Red Wings.

The largest crowd to witness a baseball game at the stadium was when the Red Wings faced their then parent organization, the Baltimore Orioles, in an exhibition game attended by 13,723 people on July 10, 1997.

== Soccer ==
ESL Ballpark has also hosted soccer matches, including those for the United States national women's soccer team and the National Women's Soccer League.

- In the 1998 Nike Cup team USA played vs. Russia in front of 13,125 in a 4–0 win. In that game, Mia Hamm became the first American, male or female, to reach the milestone of 100 international goals. Also in that tournament Brazil faced off vs Mexico at Frontier Field where Brazil dominated, winning, 11–0.
- The largest crowd for any event in ESL Ballpark history was on September 25, 2004, when the United States Women's National Soccer Team played an International Friendly vs Iceland. USA won the game 4–3, in front of 14,870 fans.

With the creation of soccer specific Rochester Community Sports Complex Stadium a few blocks over, the U.S Women's Soccer Team started playing friendlies there instead.

The first women's professional club soccer game to be played at ESL Ballpark was a National Women's Soccer League fixture between the Western New York Flash and Seattle Reign FC on July 9, 2016, which had been moved from Rochester Community Sports Complex Stadium. The selection of Frontier Field, and the decision to use an undersized, 58-yard-wide (53 m) field (under the 70-yard (64 m) minimum width set by the league), was heavily criticized by soccer players and coaches.

Events and tenants
Preceded by Silver Stadium	Home of the Rochester Red Wings; 1997 – present	Succeeded by Current
Preceded by Fauver Stadium	Home of the Rochester Raging Rhinos; 1996 – 2005	Succeeded by PAETEC Park
Preceded by first ballpark	Home of the Rochester Rattlers; 2001 – 2002	Succeeded by Bishop Kearney Field
