= Indians in the Philadelphia metropolitan area =

Philadelphia and its surrounding suburbs are home to a large and growing community of Indian Americans and other South Asian Americans. Indians make up the second-largest Asian group in the city of Philadelphia, while making up the largest foreign-born population in the greater Philadelphia metropolitan area. including growing Indian diasporas in Cherry Hill, Moorestown, Marlton, and Voorhees, all in the South Jersey region of New Jersey; Montgomery County and Bucks County in Pennsylvania; and in northern Delaware.

== History ==
There has been an Indian presence in Philadelphia since at least the 19th century, though mass immigration of Indians to the Delaware Valley didn't start until the passage of the Immigration and Nationality Act of 1965, which ended the de facto ban of Asian immigrants to the United States. One of the most notable Indians to come to Philadelphia in the 19th century was Anandi Gopal Joshi, the first Indian female doctor of Western medicine, who came to study in the Woman's Medical College of Pennsylvania, one of the few medical schools in the United States to admit women. Activities related to the Indian independence movement would also take place in Philadelphia, with the Ghadar Party being active in the city and a joint rally of Indian and Irish nationalists against British imperial rule taking place in 1920.

Immigration from India would dramatically increase starting in the 1970s, with many Indians coming to study in Philadelphia's higher education institutions to pursue advanced degrees. Many Indian medical professionals also came to do research in Philadelphia's university hospitals, while Indian engineers got jobs at places such as the Limerick Nuclear Power Plant. As Indians started to get more settled in Philadelphia, they quickly started to move from the central parts of the city to outlying neighborhoods and suburbs such as Northeast Philadelphia, Montgomery County, and Bucks County, with the small suburb of Millbourne becoming the first majority-Indian town in the United States by 2000. The Indian population continued boom in the first decade of the 21st century, doubling to over 80,000 from 2000 to 2010, with growth in affluent suburbs such as Exton.

== Notable people ==
- Sean Desai, Philadelphia Eagles defensive coordinator
- Ro Khanna, U.S. congressional representative
- Kevin Negandhi, sports journalist
- Nikil Saval, Pennsylvania state senator
- M. Night Shyamalan, director
