= Oswego Starchboxes =

- 1886–1888; Oswego, New York

Minor league affiliations
- Class: Independent (1886-1888)
- League: International League (1886-1887); Eastern International League (1888)

Minor league titles
- League titles (0): None
- Division titles (1): 1888

Team data
- Name: Oswego Starchboxes (1886-1888)

The Oswego Starchboxes were a minor league baseball team based in Oswego, New York, and Oswego County, New York. The Starchboxes played as members of the 1886 and 1887 International League and 1888 Eastern International League. The Starchboxes hosted home games at Richardson Park in Oswego.

== History ==
The Starchboxes were immediately preceded in minor league play by the 1885 Oswego Sweegs. The Sweegs were the first minor league team based in Oswego and played the season as members of the New York State League, placing fifth in the final standings with a 35–51 record and finishing 15.5 games behind the first place Syracuse Stars.

In 1886, the Oswego "Starchboxes" became members of the International League. The Binghamton Bingoes, Buffalo Bisons, Hamilton Clippers, Rochester Maroons, Syracuse Stars, Toronto Canucks and Utica Pent-Ups teams joined Oswego in beginning league play on May 8, 1886. The league was also called by the interchangeable "International Association."

The "Starchboxes" nickname corresponds with local history and the starch production industry. Oswego has been home to the Kingsford Starch Factory since 1848.

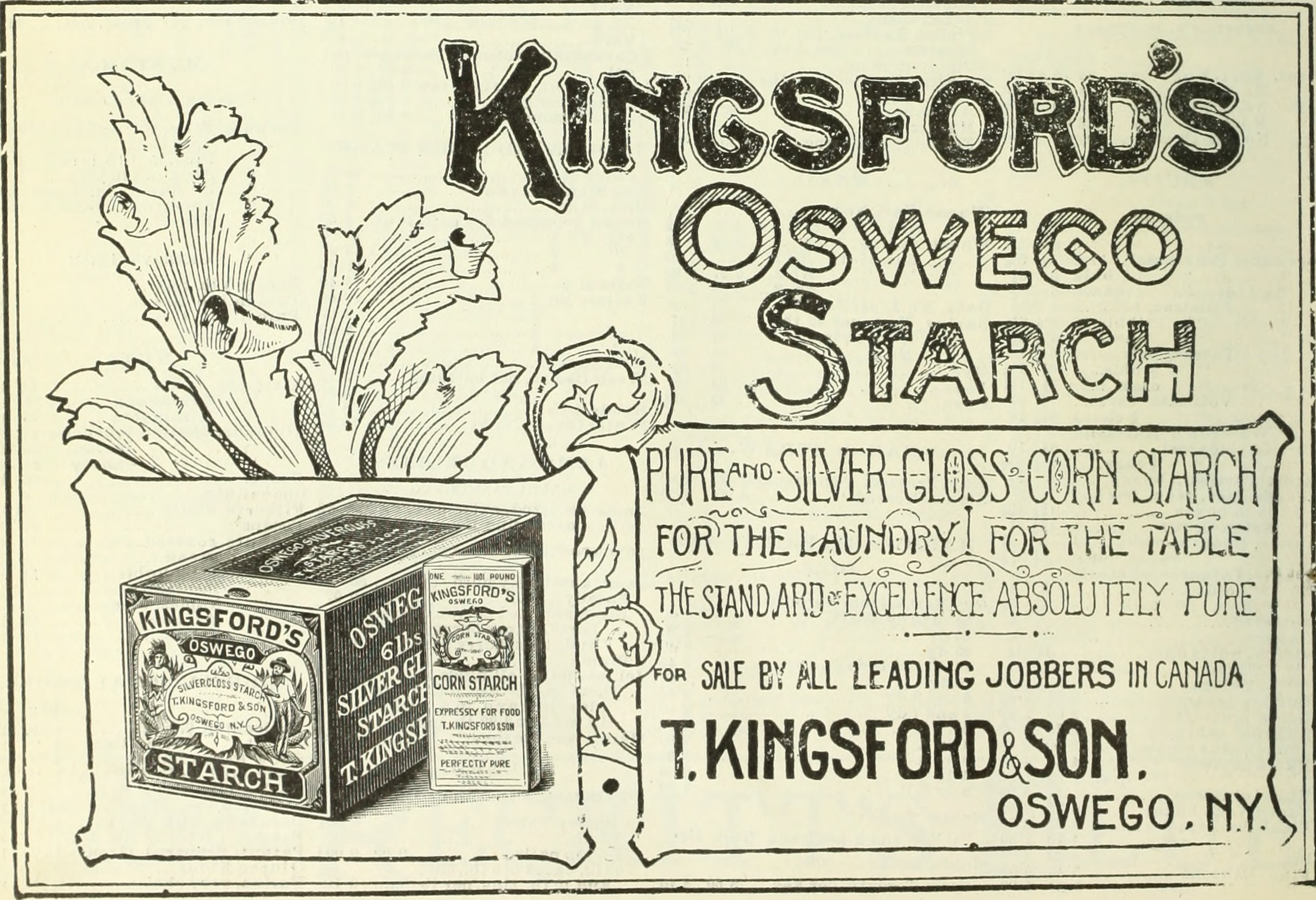
(1892) Canadian Grocer advertisement

In their first season of play, the Starchboxes finished last in the eight-team International League standings. The Oswego ended the 1886 season with a record of 23–72, finishing eighth in the International League standings. Buck West and Henry Ormsbee served as managers. Oswego finished 48.5 games behind the first place Utica Pent-Ups in the final standings.

After a poor record to begin the season, the 1887 Oswego Starchboxes folded during the International League season. On May 31, 1887, Oswego folded with a 3–23 record. The team was managed by Wes Curry and Michael Gill. The Oswego franchise was replaced by Scranton in league play.

In 1888, the Starchmakers reformed and the team played as a charter member of the four–team 1888 Eastern International League. Teams from Belleville, Ontario, Kingston, Ontario and Watertown, New York joined Oswego in beginning league play on May 24, 1888.

Oswego began the 1888 season with a 16–8 record and captured the first half championship in the league. However, the franchise folded on July 4, 1888.

The Eastern International League folded following the 1888 season. Oswego next hosted minor league baseball when the 1898 Oswego Grays began play in the New York State League. In 1905, the Oswego Starchmakers team was formed and began play as a member of the Independent level Empire State League.

== The ballpark ==
The Oswego Starchboxes teams played minor league home games at Richardson Park. The ballpark hosted minor league teams from 1885 to 1907. A public works facility occupies the site today. In the era, the ballpark was located at East Lith & Seneca Street with trolley service serving the park.

== Timeline ==
Year(s)	# Yrs.	Team	Level	League	Ballpark
1886-1887	2	Oswego Starchmakers	Independent	International League	Richardson Park
1888	1	Oswego Starchmakers	Independent	Eastern International League	Richardson Park

== Year–by–year records ==
Year	Record	Finish	Manager	Playoffs/Notes
1886	23–72	8th	Henry Ormsbee / Buck West	No playoffs held
1887	3-23	NA	Wes Curry, Michael Gill	Team folded May 31
1888	16–8	NA	James Harmon	Won 1st half standings Team folded July 4

== Notable alumni ==
- Joe Ardner (1886)
- Ed Clark (1886)
- Wes Curry (1887, MGR)
- Bill Farmer (1887)
- Joe Flynn (1886)
- Eddie Fusselback (1887)
- Lou Galvin (1886)
- Lew Graulich (1887)
- Ed Green (1886)
- John Greenig (1886)
- Frank Heifer (1887)
- Charlie Hilsey (1887)
- Jack Horner (1887)
- Charlie Householder (1886)
- Patrick Larkins (1886)
- Johnny Lavin (1887)
- Harry Lyons (1887)
- Mike Mattimore (1886)
- Joe McGuckin (1886)
- Tom Morrissey (1886)
- Doc Oberlander (1886-1887)
- Dave Oldfield (1887)
- Franklin W. Olin (1887)
- John Richmond (1886)
- Charlie Robinson (1886)
- John Shoupe (1886)
- Bill Sweeney (1886)
- Jim Toy (1886)
- Jake Virtue (1887)
- Walt Walker (1886)
- Joe Walsh (1886)
- Buck West (1886, MGR)

== See also ==
- Oswego Starchboxes players
