= Watertown Athletics =

- 1888–1951; (1888, 1936, 1946–1951); Watertown, New York

Minor league affiliations
- Class: Independent (1888); Class C (1936, 1946–1951)
- League: Eastern International League (1888); Canadian–American League (1936); Border League (1946–1951)

Major league affiliations
- Team: Boston Bees (1936)

Minor league titles
- League titles (0): None
- Wild card berths (3): 1947; 1948; 1950

Team data
- Name: Watertown (1888); Watertown Grays (1936); Watertown Athletics (1946–1951)
- Ballpark: Duffy Fairgrounds (1936, 1946–1951)

The Watertown Athletics were a minor league baseball team based in Watertown, New York.. The Athletics played from 1946 to 1951 and were preceded by the 1936 Watertown Greys and an 1888 Watertown team. Watertown teams played as members of the 1888 Eastern International League, 1936 Canadian–American League and Border League from 1946 to 1951. The Watertown Grays and Athletics hosted home games at Duffy Fairgrounds. Watertown was a minor league affiliate of the Boston Bees in 1936.

== History ==
Minor league baseball started in Watertown, New York in 1888. The Watertown team played as a member of the four–team 1888 Eastern International League. On August 10, 1888, Watertown was in 2nd place in the league under manager Lee Kingsley when the team disbanded with 14–26 record, causing the league to fold.

Professional baseball returned in 1936, when the Watertown Grays, also known as the "Bucks," became charter members of the Class C level Canadian–American League, playing as an affiliate of the Boston Bees. Watertown drew 41 total fans on opening day in bad weather. Watertown finished with a record of 35–52 under manager Admiral Martin, placing fifth in the six–team Can-Am League. The league 1946 league standings also included the Brockville Pirates (43–36), Ogdensburg Colts (38–45), Oswego Netherlands (32–51), Ottawa Senators (53–37) and Perth Blue Cats/Royals (50–30). On June 24, 1936, Watertown had a record of 13–15 when the franchise briefly moved to Massena, New York before returning to Watertown. The Massena Grays compiled a 4–9 record while based in Massena, before the franchise relocated back to Watertown on July 12, 1936. The franchise folded after the 1936 season.

In 1946, minor league play resumed when the Watertown Athletics became charter members of the Class C level Border League. The six–team league standings featured the Auburn Cayugas (72–44), Granby Red Sox (54–60), Kingston Ponies (58–55), Ogdensburg Maples (50–68), Sherbrooke Canadians (46–71) and Watertown Athletics (69–51).

Watertown won the 1946 Border League championship. The Athletics finished the regular season 69–51, placing second in the league standings, playing the season under manager Jim Scott. In the playoffs, the Watertown Athletics defeated the Granby Red Sox 3 games to 1. In the Finals, the Watertown Athletics defeated the Kingston Ponies 4 games to 2 to claim the championship. 1946 season attendance was 53,605, an average of 893.

The Watertown Athletics qualified for the 1947 playoffs. With a 70–54 regular season record to place second in the Border League, as manager Bob Shawkey led the team into the 1947 Playoffs. There, the Ogdensburg Maples defeated the Watertown Athletics 4 games to 3 in the first round of the playoffs to end their season. Watertown season attendance was 53,600.

The 1948 Watertown Athletics advanced to the Border League Finals. Manager Fred Gerken led the team to a 63–65 record and a fourth place regular season finish. In the Playoffs, the Watertown Athletics defeated the Geneva Robins 4 games to 3. In the Finals, the Ogdensburg Maples swept the Watertown Athletics 4 games 0. The season attendance was 65,590, an average of 1,025.

The Watertown Athletics finished with a record of 58–71, placing fifth in the 1949 Border League. Playing under manager Franklin Heller, the Athletics did not qualify for the playoffs. Their 1949 attendance was 61,026, averaging 946 per game.

The 1950 Watertown Athletics returned to the playoffs, led again by manager Franklin Heller. The Athletics placed fourth, with a 60–68 record in the Border League regular season standings. In the playoffs, the Athletics fell in the first round, as the Ogdensburg Maples defeated the Watertown 4 games to 1. The Athletics had a total season attendance of 65,329, an average of 1,021 per game.

The Watertown Athletics folded midway through the 1951 season. On July 1, 1951, with a 22–30 record under manager Bob Shawkey, the Watertown franchise folded.> The season attendance to that date was 18,055, an average of 694. The Border League folded permanently on July 10, 1951.

Watertown next hosted minor league baseball when the 1983 Watertown Pirates became members of the New York-Penn League. Today, the "Watertown Rapids," a summer collegiate baseball team, play as members of the Perfect Game Collegiate Baseball League.

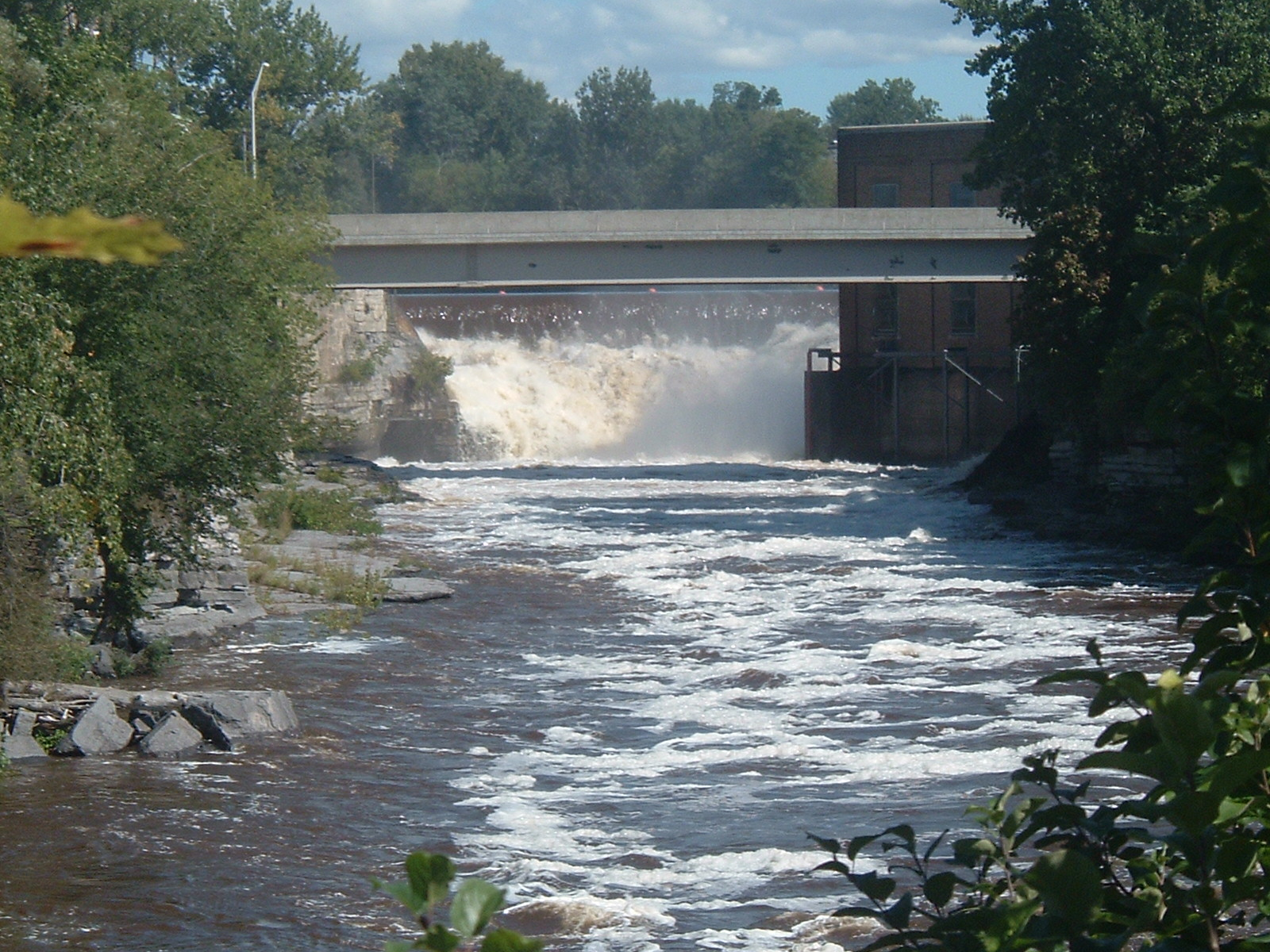
(2004) Black River. Watertown, New York

== The ballpark ==
The Watertown Athletics teams were noted to have played minor league home games at Duffy Fairgrounds. Still in use today, the ballpark is located at 970 Coffeen Street in Watertown, New York. Today, the summer collegiate baseball team, the Watertown Rapids of the Perfect Game Collegiate Baseball League are among the current tenants utilizing Duffy Fairgrounds.

== Timeline ==
Year(s)	# Yrs.	Team	Level	League	Affiliate	Ballpark
1888	1	Watertown	Independent	Eastern International League	None	Duffy Fairgrounds
1936	1	Watertown Grays	Class C	Canadian–American League	Boston Bees	Duffy Fairgrounds
1946–1951	6	Watertown Athletics	Class C	Border League	None	Duffy Fairgrounds

== Year–by–year records ==
Year	Record	Finish	Manager	Attend	Playoffs/Notes
1888	14–26	3rd	Lee Kingsley	NA	Team and league disbanded July 10
1936	18–28	5th	Admiral Martin	NA	Team moved to Massena (4–9) June 24; Massena returned to Watertown July 12
1946	69–51	2nd	Jim Scott	53,605	League champions
1947	70–54	2nd	Bob Shawkey	53,600	Lost in first round
1948	63–65	4th	Fred Gerken	65,590	Lost League Finals
1949	58–71	5th	Frank Heller	61,026	Did not qualify
1950	60–68	4th	Frank Heller	65,329	Lost in first round
1951	22–30	NA	Bob Shawkey	18,055	League disbanded July 16; Team disbanded July 1

== Notable alumni ==
- Arnold Carter (1947)
- Jim Devlin (1948)
- Joe Campinha (1950)
- Frank Fanovich (1947)
- Hal Naragon (1948)
- Jim Scott (1946, MGR)
- Bob Shawkey (1947, 1951, MGR) 1912 AL ERA Leader

== See also ==
Watertown Athletics players
