= List of Philadelphia Phillies no-hitters =

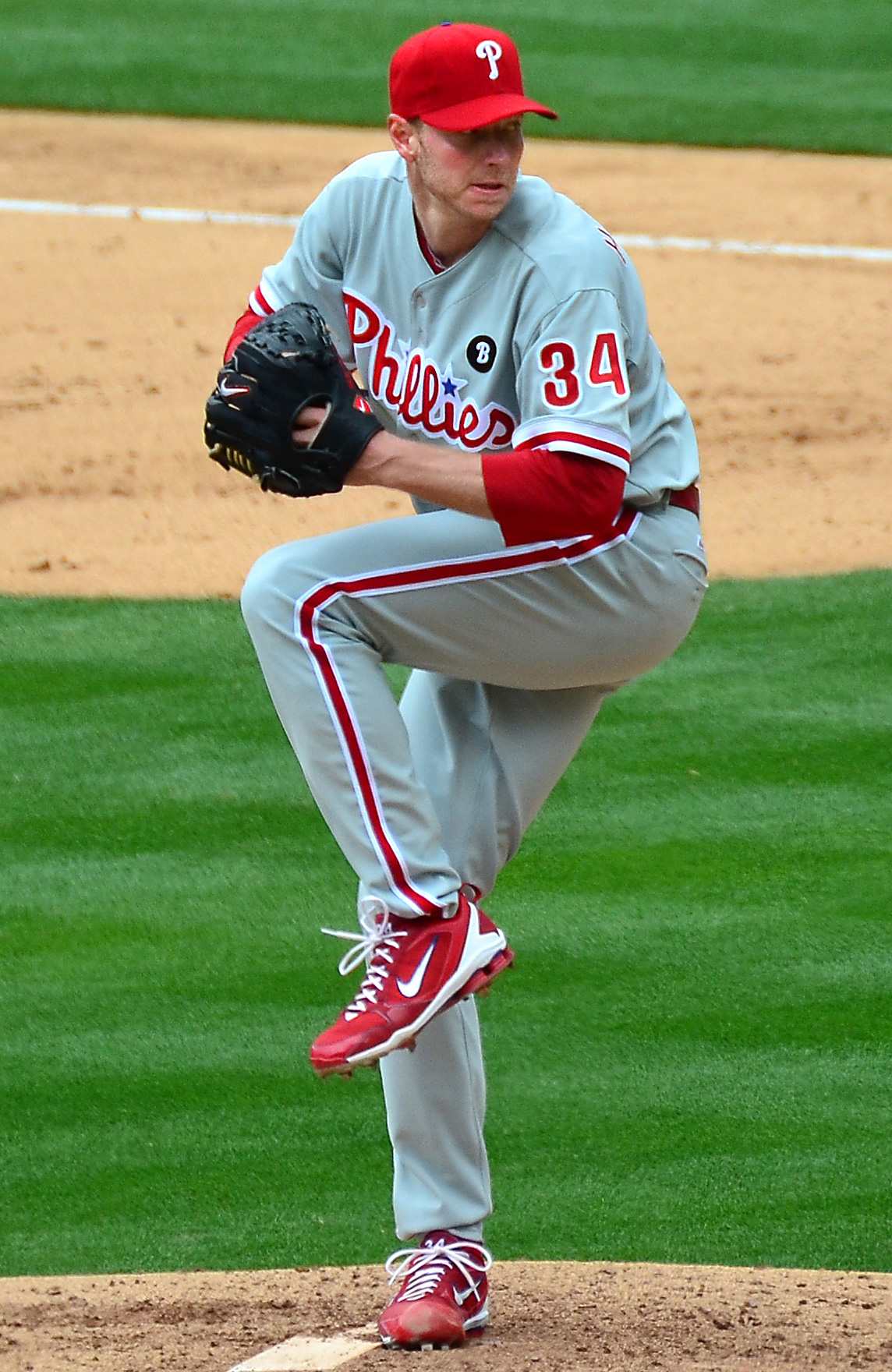
Roy Halladay is the only pitcher in Phillies history to throw multiple no-hit games with the team: a perfect game in May 2010; and a postseason no-hitter in October of that year.

The Philadelphia Phillies are a Major League Baseball franchise based in Philadelphia. They play in the National League East division. Also known in their early years as the "Philadelphia Quakers", pitchers for the Phillies have thrown fourteen separate no-hitters in franchise history. A no-hitter is officially recognized by Major League Baseball only "when a pitcher (or pitchers) allows no hits during the entire course of a game, which consists of at least nine innings", though one or more batters "may reach base via a walk, an error, a hit by pitch, a passed ball or wild pitch on strike three, or catcher's interference". No-hitters of less than nine complete innings were previously recognized by the league as official; however, several rule alterations in 1991 changed the rule to its current form.

Of the fourteen no-hitters pitched by Phillies players, three have been won by a score of 6–0, and three by a score of 1–0, more common than any other results. The largest margin of victory in a Phillies no-hitter was ten runs, in a 10–0 win by Chick Fraser. Charlie Ferguson's no-hitter, the first in franchise history, was a 1–0 victory, as were two of the more recent regular season no-hitters, thrown by Kevin Millwood in 2003 and Roy Halladay in 2010. Three pitchers to throw no-hitters for the Phillies have been left-handed: Johnny Lush (in 1906), Terry Mulholland (in 1990) and Cole Hamels (in 2015). The other nine pitchers were right-handed. Halladay is the only Phillies' pitcher to throw more than one no-hitter in a Phillies uniform, and others, including Hall of Famer Jim Bunning, have pitched more than one in their careers. The longest interval between Phillies no-hitters was between the games pitched by Lush and Bunning, encompassing 58 years, 1 month, and 20 days from May 1, 1906 to June 21, 1964. Conversely, the shortest interval between no-hitters was between Halladay's two 2010 no-hitters, with a total of merely four months and seven days from May 29 to October 6; the shortest gap between regular-season no-hitters was between Mulholland's and Tommy Greene's games (nine months and eight days from August 15, 1990 to May 23, 1991). Two opponents have been no-hit by the Phillies more than one time: the San Francisco Giants, who were defeated by Mulholland (in 1990) and Millwood (in 2003); and the Cincinnati Reds, who were no-hit by Rick Wise (in 1971) and Halladay (in 2010).

The umpire is also an integral part of any no-hitter. The task of the umpire in a baseball game is to make any decision "which involves judgment, such as, but not limited to, whether a batted ball is fair or foul, whether a pitch is a strike or a ball, or whether a runner is safe or out… [the umpire's judgment on such matters] is final." Part of the duties of the umpire making calls at home plate includes defining the strike zone, which "is defined as that area over homeplate (sic) the upper limit of which is a horizontal line at the midpoint between the top of the shoulders and the top of the uniform pants, and the lower level is a line at the hollow beneath the kneecap." These calls define every baseball game and are therefore integral to the completion of any no-hitter. A different umpire presided over each of the Phillies' fourteen no-hitters, including Wes Curry, who created Major League Baseball's catcher interference rule.

Two perfect games, a special subcategory of no-hitter, have been pitched in Phillies history. This feat was achieved by Bunning in 1964, which was the first perfect game in the National League since 1880, and Halladay in 2010. As defined by Major League Baseball, "in a perfect game, no batter reaches any base during the course of the game."

On July 25, 2015, Phillies left-hander Cole Hamels threw his first career no-hitter in a 5–0 win over the Chicago Cubs at the historic Wrigley Field. He narrowly missed completing a perfect game by walking two Cubs batters. Odubel Herrera, Phillies centerfielder, nearly dropped the game's final out at the warning track after he overran a long fly ball hit by Cubs rookie sensation Kris Bryant; Herrera, however, was able to snag the ball with an awkward sliding catch to close out the game and preserve Hamels's no-hitter. In addition to this being Cole Hamels's first no-hitter, this was the fourth no hitter caught by longtime Phillies catcher Carlos Ruiz, who now has tied the MLB record for no-hitters caught.

== List of Phillies no-hitters ==
¶	Indicates a perfect game
§	Indicates game pitched in the postseason
£	Pitcher was left-handed
*	Member of the National Baseball Hall of Fame and Museum

Date	Pitcher	Final score	Base- runners	Opponent	Catcher	Umpire	Notes	Ref
August 29, 1885	Charlie Ferguson	1–0	4	Providence Grays	Jack Clements	Wes Curry	First no-hitter in franchise history; First Phillies no-hitter at home ballpark; First Phillies no-hitter at Recreation Park; Smallest margin of victory in a Phillies no-hitter (tie)	
July 8, 1898	Red Donahue	5–0	4	Boston Beaneaters	Ed McFarland	John Gaffney	First Phillies no-hitter at National League Park	
September 18, 1903	Chick Fraser	10–0	7	Chicago Colts	Red Dooin	Bob Emslie	Largest margin of victory for the Phillies in a no-hitter; First Phillies no-hitter in a road game	
May 1, 1906	Johnny Lush^{£}	6–0	4	Brooklyn Dodgers	Jerry Donovan	Hank O'Day	First Phillies no-hitter by a left-handed pitcher	
June 21, 1964	Jim Bunning*^{¶}	6–0	0	New York Mets	Gus Triandos	Ed Sudol	Father's Day; Perfect game (first in Phillies history; see also Jim Bunning's perfect game); First perfect game pitched in a National League game in the Modern Era; Longest interval between no-hitters in franchise history; Game one of a doubleheader	
June 23, 1971	Rick Wise	4–0	1	Cincinnati Reds	Tim McCarver	Jerry Dale	Two home runs also hit by pitcher Rick Wise	
August 15, 1990	Terry Mulholland^{£}	6–0	1	San Francisco Giants	Darren Daulton	Eric Gregg	First Phillies no-hitter at Veterans Stadium	
May 23, 1991	Tommy Greene	2–0	7	Montreal Expos	Darrin Fletcher	Jim Quick	First Phillies no-hitter outside of the United States; Shortest interval between regular season no-hitters in franchise history	
April 27, 2003	Kevin Millwood	1–0	3	San Francisco Giants	Mike Lieberthal	Mike Everitt	Smallest margin of victory in a Phillies no-hitter (tie)	
May 29, 2010	Roy Halladay*^{¶}	1–0	0	Florida Marlins	Carlos Ruiz	Mike DiMuro	Perfect game (second in Phillies history; see also Halladay's perfect game); Smallest margin of victory in a Phillies no-hitter (tie)	
October 6, 2010	Roy Halladay*	4–0^{§}	1	Cincinnati Reds	Carlos Ruiz	John Hirschbeck	Second no-hitter in postseason history; first since Don Larsen's perfect game in the 1956 World Series; Game 1 of the 2010 NLDS; First no-hitter at Citizens Bank Park; Shortest interval between no-hitters in franchise history	
September 1, 2014	Cole Hamels^{£} Jake Diekman^{£} Ken Giles Jonathan Papelbon	7–0	6	Atlanta Braves	Carlos Ruiz	Jordan Baker	Labor Day; First combined no-hitter in Phillies history; Hamels pitched six innings; each reliever threw a single inning; Carlos Ruiz catches National League record-tying third no-hit game	
July 25, 2015	Cole Hamels^{£}	5–0	2	Chicago Cubs	Carlos Ruiz	Phil Cuzzi	Ended the Cubs' streak of games without being no-hit, then the longest active streak, at 7,931 games and 50 years (1965–2015); First no-hitter at Wrigley Field in 43 years (1972–2015); Carlos Ruiz sets NL record with his fourth no-hit game; ties MLB record (Jason Varitek).; Hamels was traded to the Texas Rangers six days after throwing the no-hitter.	
August 9, 2023	Michael Lorenzen	7–0	4	Washington Nationals	J. T. Realmuto	Brennan Miller	First home start for Lorenzen after being traded to the Phillies from the Detroit Tigers; First time the Nationals had been no-hit in franchise history; Ended the Nationals' streak of games without being no-hit (dating back to when they were the Expos), then the longest active streak at 3,810 games (1999–2023)	

== See also ==
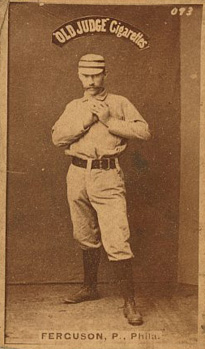
Charles Ferguson pitched the Phillies' first no-hitter.

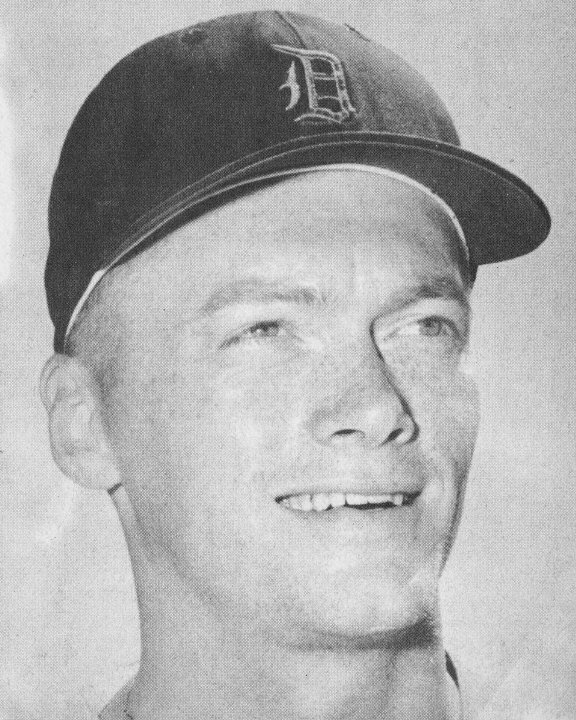
Jim Bunning pitched the Phillies' first perfect game.

- List of Major League Baseball no-hitters
