= Mets–Phillies rivalry =

Major League Baseball rivalry

- New York Mets Philadelphia Phillies
- Location: Mid-Atlantic United States
- First meeting: April 27, 1962; Polo Grounds, New York, New York; Phillies 11, Mets 9
- Latest meeting: September 20, 2026; Citi Field, New York, New York; Phillies 7, Mets 2
- Next meeting: May 4, 2027; Citizens Bank Park, Philadelphia, Pennsylvania
- Stadiums: Mets: Citi Field; Phillies: Citizens Bank Park

Statistics
- Total meetings: 1,110
- All-time series: Phillies, 569–541 (.513)
- Regular season series: Phillies, 568–538 (.514)
- Postseason results: Mets, 3–1 (.750)
- Largest victory: Mets, 24–4 (August 16, 2018); Phillies, 26–7 (June 11, 1985)
- Longest win streak: Mets, 10 (September 10, 1971–June 28, 1972; May 9–August 31, 2015); Phillies, 10 (June 29–September 25, 1980)
- Current win streak: Phillies, 1

Post-season history
- 2024 NL Division Series: Mets won, 3–1

Locations of the New York Mets and Philadelphia Phillies

The Mets–Phillies rivalry or Battle of the Broads is a Major League Baseball (MLB) rivalry between the New York Mets and Philadelphia Phillies. Both clubs are members of MLB's National League (NL) East division. The rivalry between the two clubs is said to be among the most fiercely contested in the NL. The two NL East divisional rivals have met each other recently in playoff, division, and Wild Card races. The Battle of the Broads name is a nod to both cities having the word Broad in their major thoroughfare names: Broadway in New York, and Broad Street in Philadelphia.

Aside from several brawls in the 1980s, the rivalry remained relatively calm before the 2006 season, as the teams had rarely been competing for a playoff spot at the same time. A notable moment in their early meetings was Jim Bunning's perfect game on Father's Day of 1964, the first perfect game in Phillies history, which happened when the Mets were on a losing streak. The Phillies were near the bottom of the NL East when the Mets won the 1969 World Series and the NL pennant in 1973, while the Mets did not enjoy success in the late 1970s when the Phillies won three straight division championships. Although both teams each won a World Series in the 1980s, the Mets were not serious contenders in the Phillies' playoff years (1980, 1981, and 1983), nor did the Phillies seriously contend in the Mets' playoff years (1986 and 1988). The Mets were the Majors' worst team when the Phillies won the NL pennant in 1993, and the Phillies could not post a winning record in either of the Mets' wild-card-winning seasons of 1999 or 2000, when the Mets faced the New York Yankees in the 2000 World Series.

The rivalry intensified in the mid-2000s, as the teams battled more often for playoff positions. The Mets won the division in 2006, while the Phillies won five consecutive division titles from 2007 to 2011. The Phillies' 2007 championship was notable because they won it on the last day of the season as the Mets lost a seven-game lead with 17 games remaining. The Phillies broke the Curse of Billy Penn to win the 2008 World Series, while the Mets' last title came in the 1986 World Series.

In 2015, the Mets won the NL Championship Series for their fifth pennant while the Phillies entered a rebuild phase. The Mets beat the Phillies 14 times and lost 5 for a lopsided season series. The season still provided contentious moments such as, Mets pitcher Matt Harvey drilling Phillies 2nd baseman Chase Utley in retaliation for Mets players getting hit by Phillies pitchers, a benches clearing argument between Phillies coach Larry Bowa in regards to a quick pitch by Hansel Robles and a bat flip by Daniel Murphy. Phillies star Chase Utley, while traded to the Los Angeles Dodgers mid-season, injured Mets shortstop Rubén Tejada on a slide during Game 2 of the 2015 NL Division Series (NLDS). The two teams met in the playoffs for the first time in the 2024 NLDS, with the Mets defeating the Phillies three games to one.

== Early history ==
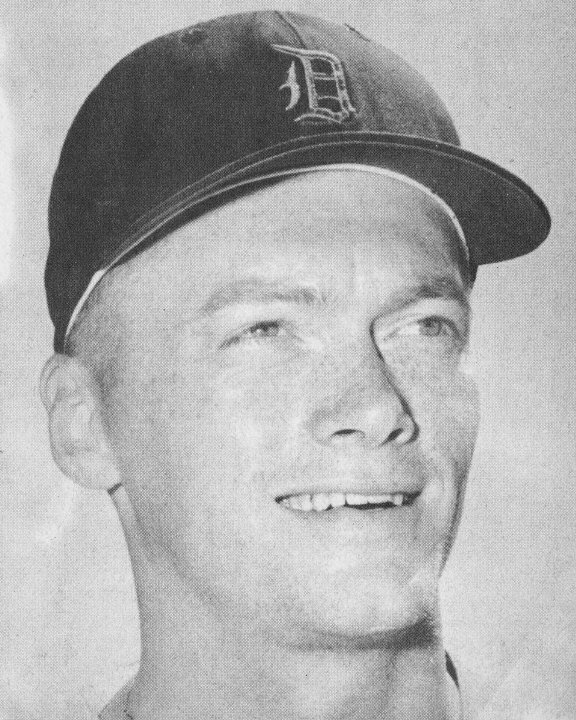
Jim Bunning threw the first perfect game in Phillies franchise history—one of fourteen no-hitters.

=== Bunning's perfect game ===
Bunning's perfect game occurred in the 1964 season, during which the Phillies finished at the top and the Mets finished bottom. Pitcher Jim Bunning, in his first season with the Phillies, entered play on June 21 with a 6–2 record on the season. He was opposed on the mound by Tracy Stallard for the Mets in the first game of a doubleheader. Through the first four innings, Bunning totaled four strikeouts through 12 batters.

In the fifth inning, Phillies second baseman Tony Taylor preserved the perfect game with his strong defensive play. A diving catch and a throw from the knees kept Mets catcher Jesse Gonder off of the bases. Bunning also made plays at the plate, hitting a double and driving in two runs in the sixth inning.

By the end of the game, even the Mets fans were cheering Bunning's effort; he had only reached a three-ball count on two batters, and retired shortstop Charley Smith on a pop-out, and pinch-hitters George Altman and John Stephenson on strikeouts, to complete the perfect game. Bunning, who at the time had seven children, said that his game, pitched on Father's Day, could not have come at a more appropriate time. He remarked that his slider was his best pitch, "'just like the no-hitter I pitched for Detroit six years ago'". Bunning became the first pitcher to throw a winning no-hitter in both leagues, and posted the first regular-season perfect game since Charlie Robertson in 1922 (Don Larsen's prior perfect game was in the 1956 World Series). The Phillies also won the second game of the doubleheader, 8–2, behind Rick Wise.

The Phillies performed strongly for most of the season, but surrendered a 6 1/2 game lead during the last weeks of the season that year, losing 10 games in a row with 12 games remaining and losing the pennant by one game to the St. Louis Cardinals. "The Phold" of 1964 is among the most notable collapses in sports history. The Mets, meanwhile, finished the year in last place, with a 53–109 record—the worst in Major League Baseball.

=== Tug McGraw ===
Tug McGraw pitched for the Mets from 1965 to 1967, and again from 1969 to 1974 after spending all of the 1968 season in the minor leagues. In those nine seasons, he amassed 86 saves and appeared in 361 games. He appeared in the postseason for the 1969 Miracle Mets, pitching three innings against the Atlanta Braves. He was selected to the 1972 All-Star team, and appeared in the Most Valuable Player (MVP) award voting in 1972 and 1973. During the 1973 pennant-winning season, he coined the Mets' rally cry, "Ya gotta believe!" In the 1974 season, McGraw experienced issues with his arm and shoulder. Thus, the Mets traded McGraw, along with outfielders Don Hahn and Dave Schneck, to the Phillies in December 1974 for pitcher Mac Scarce, catcher John Stearns, and outfielder Del Unser.

McGraw became a staple of the back end of the Phillies' bullpen, saving 94 games between 1975 and 1982, and earning a place on the 1975 All-Star team. Under manager Danny Ozark, the Phillies won three consecutive division championships from 1976 to 1978 with McGraw as the closer, while the Mets finished third in 1976 and last in 1977 and 1978. In 1980, McGraw was on the mound against the Kansas City Royals when the Phillies won their first World Series championship, earning his fourth save of that postseason. He struck out Willie Wilson with the bases loaded to preserve the win for Steve Carlton and the Phillies, leaping from the mound to embrace catcher Bob Boone on the field at Veterans Stadium in Philadelphia. Sportswriter Allen Barra recounted that McGraw, in the victory parade after the World Series, told New York fans they could "take this championship and shove it."

== 1980s–1990s ==
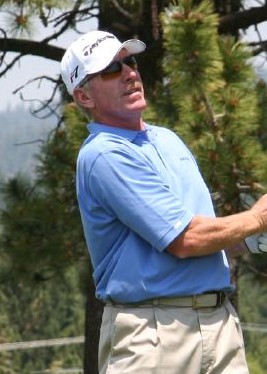
Mike Schmidt won the 1986 Most Valuable Player Award over two Mets.

=== 1986 ===
The Mets won the NL East by 21 1/2 games in 1986, but the Phillies were the only team to post a winning record against them, including winning 7 of 9 at Veterans Stadium. On September 12, up by 22 games, the Mets came to Philadelphia for a three-game weekend series needing one win to clinch the division. The Mets brought champagne to Philadelphia. Before the series, Mets manager Davey Johnson told the Associated Press, "It will be nice to clinch in Philadelphia. It gives us a chance to beat the only team in our way...I have a nice warm feeling about this." He told The Philadelphia Inquirer: "For the fans...it would be nicer to clinch at home. But for the safety...and the livelihood of the players...it's better to do it on the road."

In the series opener, Mike Schmidt hit a three-run homer, Phillies rookie Bruce Ruffin out pitched the Mets' Dwight Gooden, and the Phillies won, 6–3. The Phillies won the second game of the series, 6–5; visiting Mets fans became unruly and damaged seats in the upper deck. One Mets fan was arrested after hitting two Philadelphia police officers. The Phillies completed the sweep by beating the Mets, 6–0, behind a shutout from Kevin Gross, who also drove in two runs with a fourth-inning triple. The Mets would clinch the division at Shea Stadium on September 17. After the season, the Phils' Schmidt won the NL MVP Award, ahead of the Mets' Gary Carter and Keith Hernandez who finished third and fourth.

=== 1987–1988 ===
The Phillies played spoiler in 1987. The Mets went 13–5 against the Phillies in 1987 and outscored Philadelphia 94–56. However, the Phillies won two of three in September to hurt the Mets' chances of winning the division significantly.

The Mets' Ron Darling took a no-hitter and 4–0 lead into the eighth inning against the Phillies on June 28 at the Vet before 52,206 fans. Philadelphia's Greg Gross pinch-hit and tripled to lead off the eighth inning, breaking up the no-hitter. Juan Samuel then singled to break up the shutout, and the Phillies came back with nine hits against Jesse Orosco and Roger McDowell, scoring five runs to win 5–4. It would have been the first no-hitter in Mets history. Compounding the loss for the Mets, the Phillies were in last place at the time, and the loss dropped the Mets 6 1/2 games behind the first-place Cardinals who they would play the next day. Of the win and the Mets, Mike Schmidt said, "The Mets don't like to give credit when they lose, but they have to do it today."

On September 28, the Mets came into Philadelphia for a three-game series against the Phillies. The Mets were 2 1/2 games out of first with six games left: three against the Phillies and the last three against the first-place Cardinals. They had an opportunity to win the division and were playing the Phillies, against whom they had a season record of 12–3. The Mets won the opener, 1–0, to move within two games back with five remaining to play. However, the Phillies effectively ended their season on September 29. As the Cardinals swept a doubleheader from the Montreal Expos, the Phillies' Don Carman pitched a complete-game one-hitter, facing only 28 batters to shut out the Mets. After the game, Mets manager Davey Johnson said, "How does it feel now? Empty? Not yet. But we need to get help. When you play 162 games and you're eliminated, then you feel empty. And sick." He promised reporters, "We're going to win tomorrow night.".

The following night, Mets pitcher Dwight Gooden struck out 10, and left after pitching nine innings with the score tied at three runs each, but the Phillies' Luis Aguayo won the game with a 10th-inning pinch-hit home run off of Orosco, clinching at least a tie for first place in the division for the Cardinals.

The 1988 Mets returned to the playoffs, but the Phillies, who finished in sixth place in the division with a 65–96 record, beat the Mets 8 times in 18 games, the third-best record against them of any team in the league. The Mets won their second division title in three years in a game against the Phillies, and like two years before, did it at home. In the 1988 postseason, the Mets lost to the eventual champion Dodgers in the NL Championship Series (NLCS).

=== 1989–1990 ===
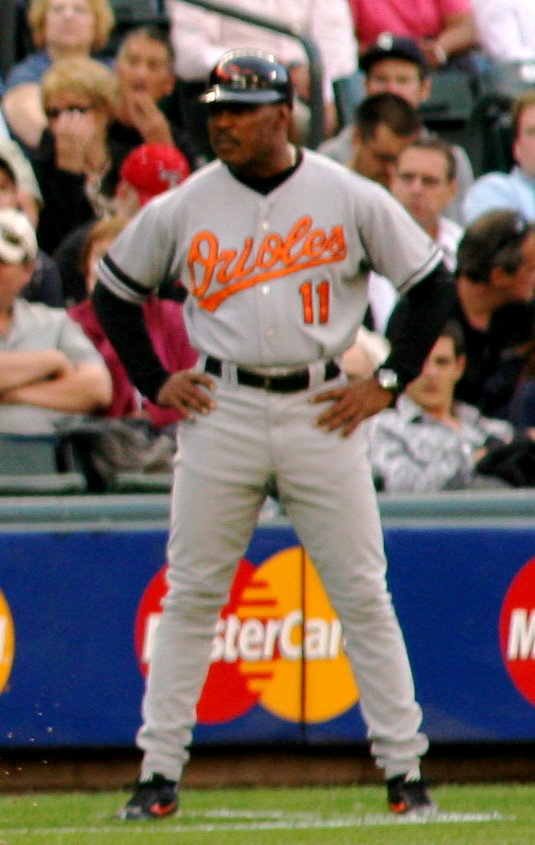
The Phillies traded Juan Samuel (pictured) to the Mets after a game between the teams for Roger McDowell and Lenny Dykstra.

On June 18, 1989, after a Mets–Phillies game, the Phillies traded Samuel to the Mets for McDowell and Lenny Dykstra. Dykstra was a career .278 hitter with the Mets and had not equaled his 1986 season when he hit .295. Dykstra flourished in Philadelphia and went on to be named to three All-Star teams in six full seasons with the Phillies, finish in the top ten in NL Most Valuable Player voting twice, and help lead the Phillies to the 1993 NL pennant. McDowell saved 45 games for the Phillies in parts of three seasons and became a fan favorite. The trade was a bust for the Mets as Samuel hit only .228 for the Mets in 1989 and was traded to the Los Angeles Dodgers after the 1989 season. It signaled an ascent of the Phillies which culminated in their 1993 NL pennant and the demise of the Mets in the early 1990s. Sports Illustrated writer and Mets fan David Vecsey counts the Dykstra trade as one of the five worst in Mets history, writing, "Never mind that Dykstra was better than Samuel, this trade was devastating to Mets fans on a purely personal level. With one phone call, GM Joe McIlvaine gutted the team of its heart." The trade also ushered in a period of bad blood between the two teams.

On September 27, 1989, the Phillies faced the Mets in their home finale at Shea Stadium in New York after a disappointing Mets season. The Mets had won the East in 1988 but were in third place on September 26 behind the Chicago Cubs and St. Louis Cardinals. McDowell was closing out a 5–3 win for the Phillies when, with two outs in the ninth, he induced former teammate Gregg Jeffries to ground out to second to end the game. As Jeffries was running out the play, McDowell said something to him prompting Jeffries to charge the mound and wrestle McDowell to the ground. The benches cleared and punches were exchanged before the umpires could separate the teams. Jeffries later claimed that McDowell had thrown at him during a 2–1 Phillies victory on September 25.

The brawling continued in 1990. During an August 9 game at Shea, Gooden hit Phillies hitters Dickie Thon and Tommy Herr. When Gooden came to bat in the fifth inning, Phillies pitcher Pat Combs hit Gooden in the knee with a fastball. Phillies outfielder Von Hayes defended Combs after the game, "Gooden better expect retaliation if he keeps hitting guys with 95 mph (153 km/h) fastballs. We've got to protect our players." Gooden charged the mound and tackled Combs. Phillies catcher Darren Daulton followed Gooden and landed a series of punches on the back of Gooden's head. Darryl Strawberry had been in the Mets clubhouse and rushed the field after Daulton but was himself blindsided by Hayes. Of Daulton, Gooden later said, "Daulton was the guy we wanted most. He's a cheap-shot artist. We learned that about him last year", referring to the September 1989 fight. Six players and Phillies coach Mike Ryan were ejected from the game. Eight players were later fined, including the Mets' Tim Teufel, who said, "It was money well spent. Sometimes you just have to defend yourself and your teammates."

=== 1991–1994 ===
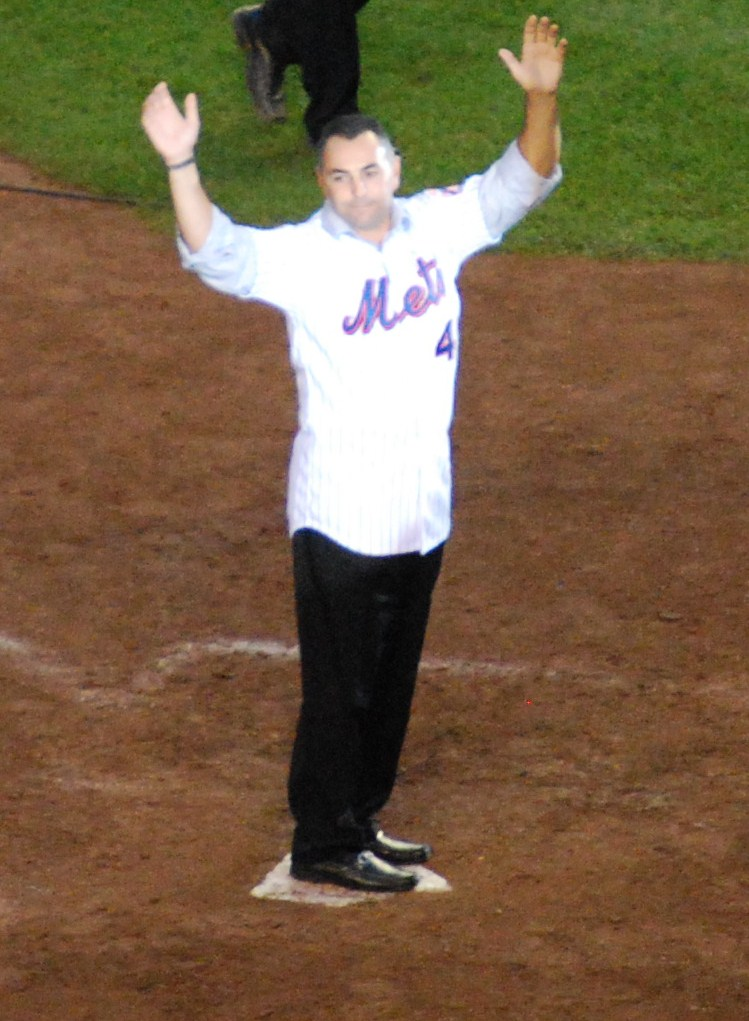
John Franco threatened to "kick [Lenny Dykstra's] butt" if he crossed the picket line during the 1994–95 Major League Baseball strike.

The tone of baseball rivalries changed in the early 1990s; fraternization between players who had moved to different teams or knew each other from various ventures kept baseball rivalries to a "friendly" level. However, MLB's 1994 divisional re-alignment solidified the rivalry between the Phillies and Mets. The Pittsburgh Pirates, former members of the NL East and in-state rivals of the Phillies, moved into the newly created NL Central Division, and the Atlanta Braves, former members of the NL West, entered the division. Prior to the switch, the East Division contained seven teams, spread out over a wider geographical area, including the St. Louis Cardinals and the Chicago Cubs, as well as the expansion Florida Marlins.

Members of all 28 teams, including the Phillies and Mets, drew together during the 1994 labor stoppage, but players from both teams were on opposite sides of the argument even then. Dykstra claimed that he was losing $30,000 ($63,387 in current dollars) per day for every day he did not work during the strike. While other players chastised Dykstra for his comments, Mets pitcher and player representative John Franco intimated that if someone crossed the picket line, as Dykstra suggested, "'once we get back in I'll be the first to kick his [butt] [sic]'".

=== 1995–2000 ===
The division-rival Braves defeated the Cleveland Indians in the 1995 World Series; on the way to doing so, they left the rest of the division behind them. The Mets and Phillies finished in second and third places in the division, respectively, with identical 69–75 records; the Braves were the only NL East team to finish above .500. The Mets and Phillies staged a close battle for second place, with New York coming out ahead, taking 7 victories from the 13-game season series.

Both the Mets and Phillies finished near the bottom of the division in 1996: the Mets ended the season in fourth place, with a 71–91 record, while the Phillies finished last (67–95). The Mets took a second consecutive close season series from the Phillies, with an identical 7–6 record to the prior year.

The 1997 Mets improved to 88–74, but that record was only good for third place in the division, as the Braves finished with 101 wins and the Marlins, with a record of 92–70, took the NL Wild Card and won the 1997 World Series. The Phillies, meanwhile, languished in last place behind the Expos, with a 68–94 record, and only managed to take 5 of 12 games from the Mets that season, including a September 9 game at Shea Stadium that was a moment of peace in the rivalry to remember former Phillies player and broadcaster and original Met Richie Ashburn, who died that morning.

The 1998 Mets finished in second place, with the Phillies right behind them in third. The Braves finished with the best record in the NL (106 wins), but did not make it to the World Series. The Mets finished over .500 for the second straight year, aided by their 8–4 record against the Phillies.

The standings were identical the next season, as the Mets faced the Braves in the 1999 NLCS; they were defeated, and the Braves lost to the New York Yankees in the ensuing World Series. The Phillies and Mets split the season series, six games each; the Phillies finished under .500 for the sixth consecutive season with a 77–85 record.

The Mets won the wild card again in 2000, finishing one game behind the Braves in the division and defeating the Cardinals in the League Championship Series to face the Yankees in the 2000 World Series. Though the Phillies finished in last place in the division with a 65–97 record, they defeated the Mets in the season series, 7–6.

== 21st century ==
=== 2001–2003: Unbalanced schedule ===
Major League Baseball changed its scheduling format in 2001, further intensifying division matchups throughout the league. The new "unbalanced schedule" allowed for additional games each season between divisional rivals, replacing additional series with teams outside the division. Due to the change, the Phillies and Mets now played each other 17 or more times each season (19 times in 2001). Early on, the unbalanced schedule favored the Mets, who had a winning percentage of .540 (27–23) against the division in the 2000 season, while the Phillies managed a .451 mark (23–28); the trend held true in 2001, when the Mets won the season series over the Phillies, 11–8.

The scheduling drew criticism both when it was enacted and after the fact, with some analysts even positing that the unbalanced schedule hurt intra-divisional play. This, however, did not affect the Phillies and Mets, as they drew an average of 27,926 fans to their games in 2001. Attendance for the rivalry games increased in 2002, to 29,403 fans per game, as the Phillies bested the Mets in the season series, 10–9, and was strong in 2003, when they drew nearly 28,000 fans per game and the Phillies took their second consecutive season series, 12–7.

=== 2005–2006: The rivalry intensifies ===
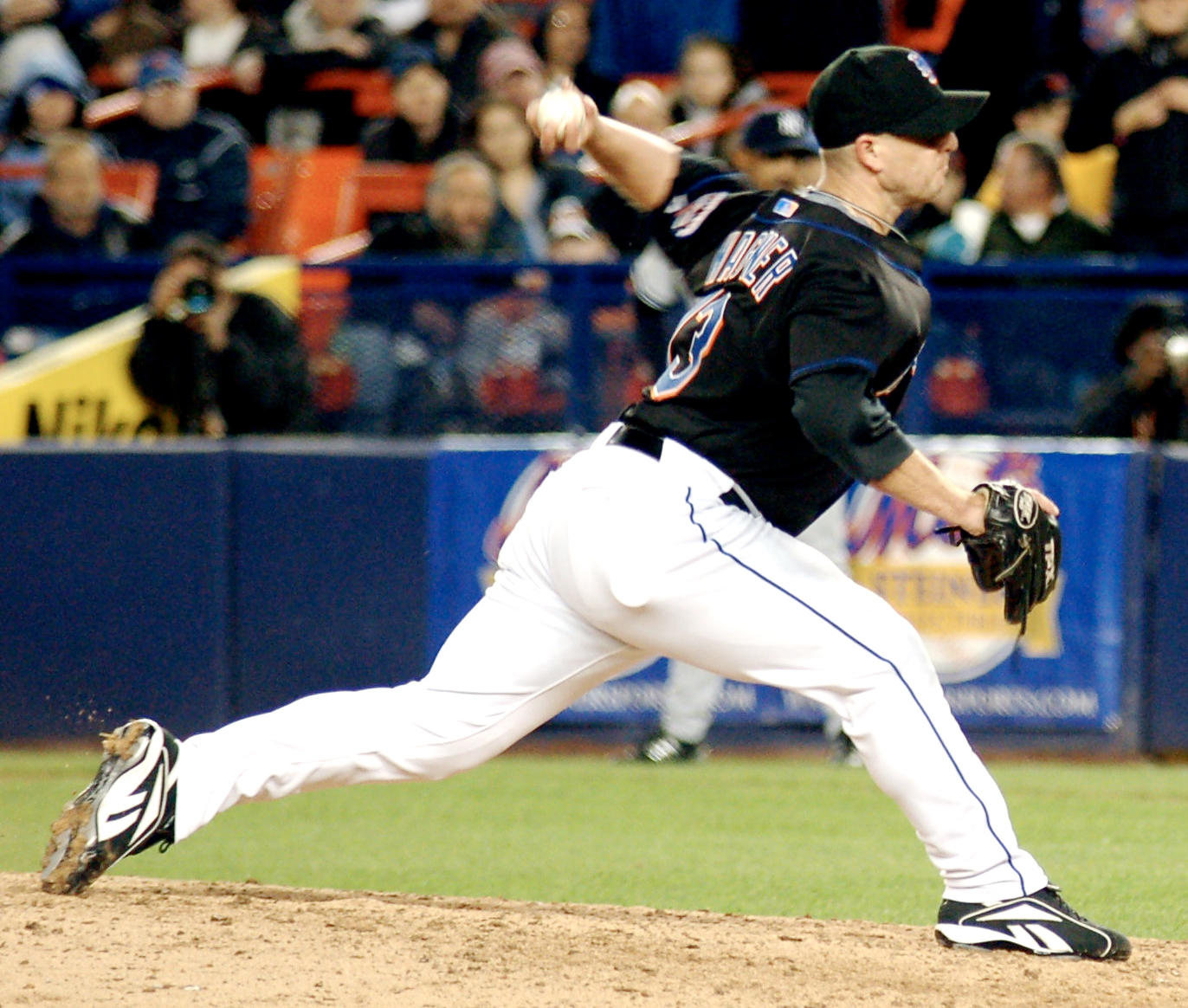
Billy Wagner (pictured) and Pat Burrell exchanged verbal shots in the media during 2006 and 2007.

The signing of former Phillies closer Billy Wagner by the Mets between the 2005 and 2006 seasons was a factor in the intensification of the rivalry. Pat Burrell and Wagner became embroiled in heated media discussions after Wagner departed the Phillies.

For the first time in 2006, both franchises fielded contenders until deep into the season. The Mets steadily led the NL East (finally supplanting the decade-long division champions, the Atlanta Braves), while the Phillies maintained pace as a wild card contender until the very end of the season. The Mets won the head-to-head season matchup, beating the Phillies 11 out of 18 times. The Mets won the division, but lost to the St. Louis Cardinals in the 2006 NLCS.

=== 2007: Rollins calls out the Mets ===
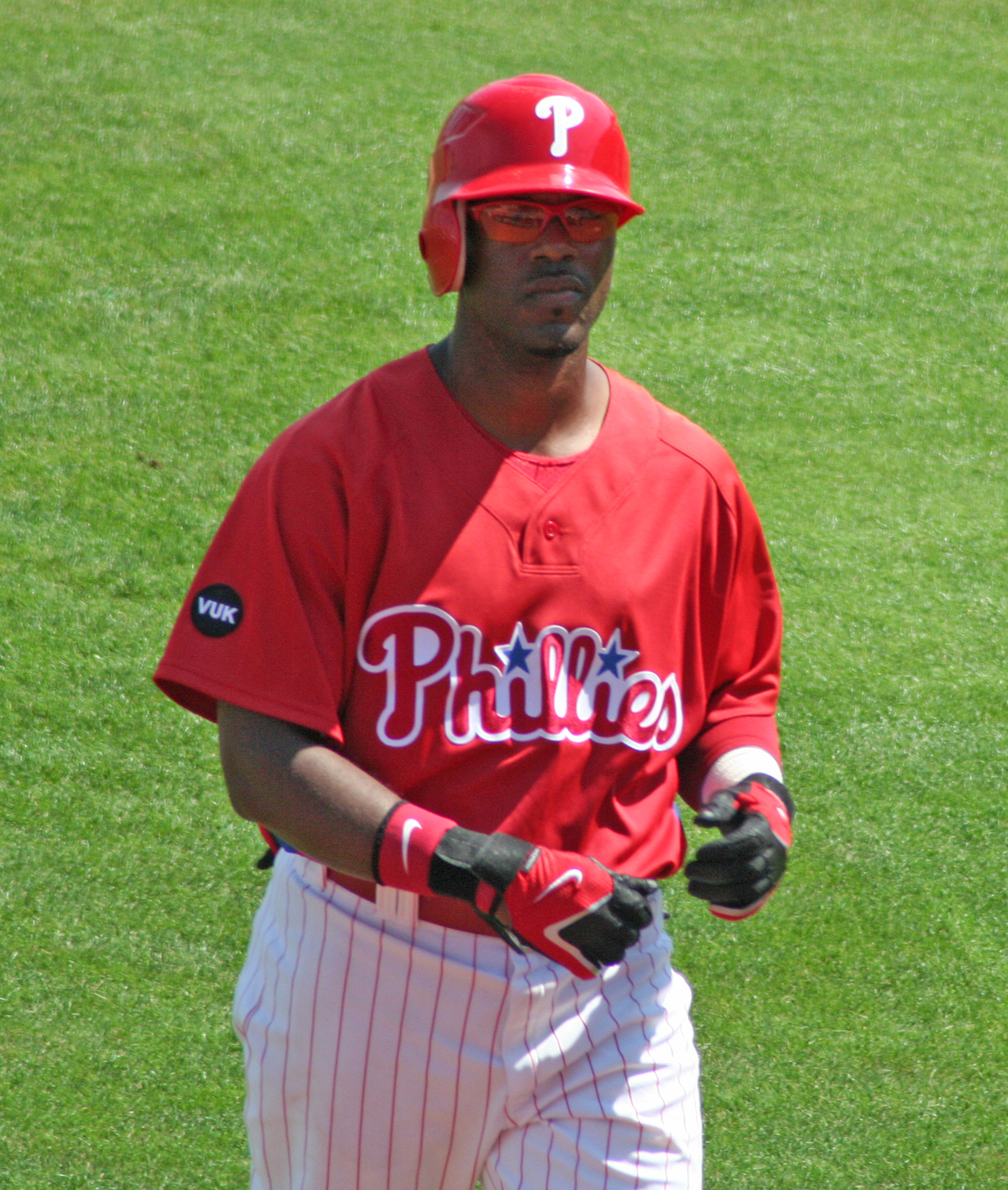
Jimmy Rollins stated the Phillies were the team to beat during the 2007 preseason.

On January 23, 2007, Phillies shortstop Jimmy Rollins made a statement that may have set the rivalry in a dead heat: "I think we are the team to beat in the NL East… but that's only on paper." Many Mets fans and players laughed at the prediction, especially once the Phillies stumbled out of the gate in April, starting the season at 1–6 and posting an 11–14 record for the month. The Mets, meanwhile, sat firmly in the NL East lead for almost all of the season.

As the season wore on, Philadelphia developed momentum as a wild-card contender. The Phillies dominated the Mets in head-to-head play, posting three separate series sweeps, including a pivotal sweep of a four-game series at Citizens Bank Park in Philadelphia during late August which included two walk-off hits by Chase Utley and Ryan Howard and comeback victories for the Phillies in three of the four games. During the season, Burrell also hit two home runs off Wagner, resulting in two blown saves.

By the time Philadelphia swept the Mets at Shea Stadium in mid-September, the Phillies were threatening to move from wild-card contender to division leader. With 17 games left to play, the Mets led the Phillies by seven games; during that final stretch, the Mets won only five games and lost twelve, while the Phillies went 13–4. On the final day of the season, the Phillies won the division, backing up Rollins' quote. Mets starter Tom Glavine gave up seven runs in the first inning to the Florida Marlins, while the Phillies beat the Washington Nationals (who had made a significant contribution to the Phillies' comeback, having gone 5–1 against the Mets during that span) behind Eastern Pennsylvania native Jamie Moyer to win the division for the first time since 1993.

Rollins capped his prediction by adding his first career Most Valuable Player award. According to Baseball Prospectus, the Mets' collapse over the end of the season ranked statistically as the second-worst in baseball history. After the 2007 season, Wagner also said that "[the] collapse didn't come because the Phillies beat us, the collapse came because we played bad".

=== 2008: Beltran fires back, Phillies win Series ===
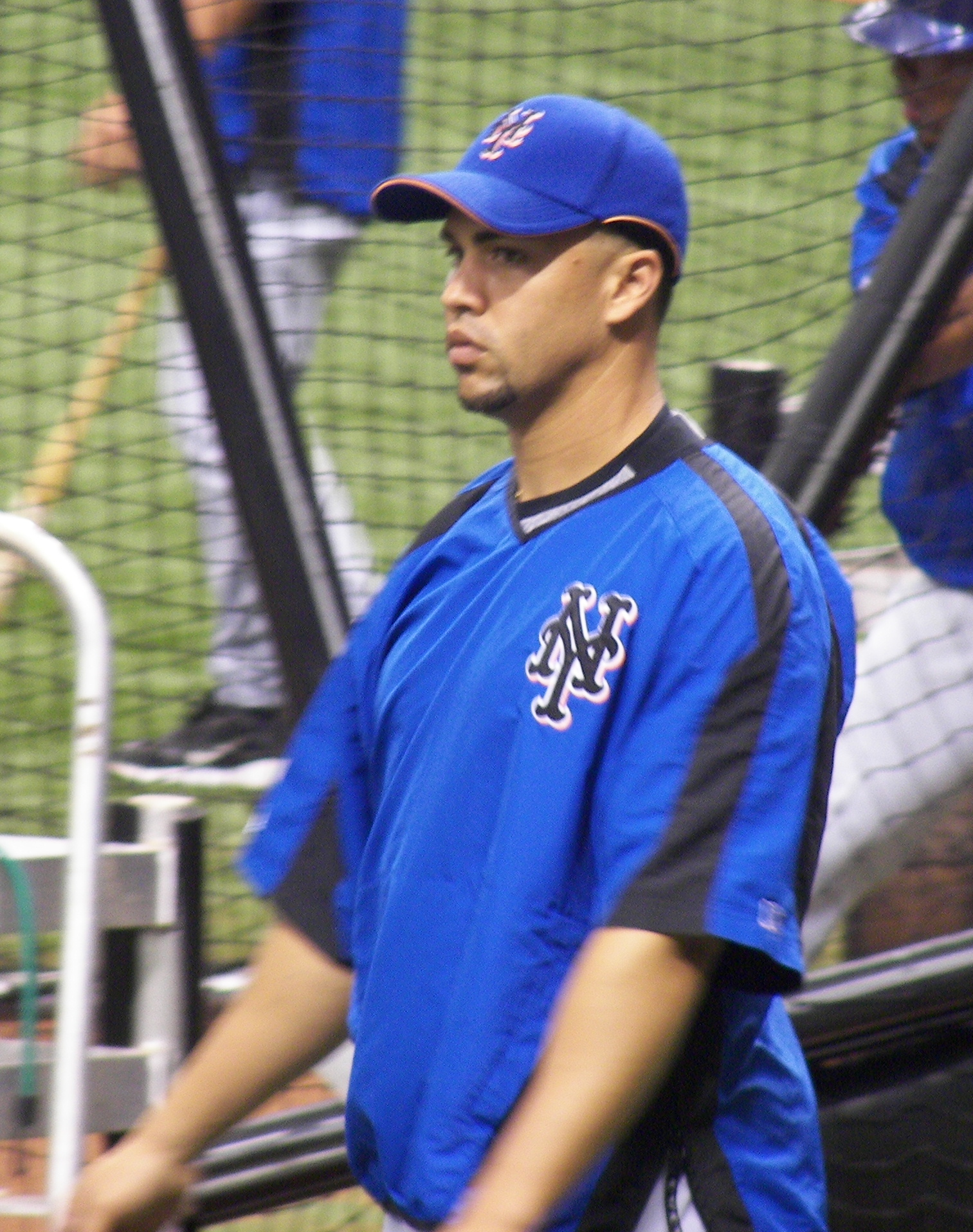
Carlos Beltrán responded to Jimmy Rollins' comment again during Spring training in 2008.

On February 16, 2008, Mets center fielder Carlos Beltrán made a statement regarding the upcoming season. He stated that "[without] Santana, we felt, as a team, that we had a chance to win in our division. With him now, I have no doubt that we're going to win in our division. I have no doubt in that. We've got what it takes. To Jimmy Rollins: We are the team to beat." Inasmuch as Beltran had imitated Rollins' 2007 preseason prediction, Rollins arrived in camp for Spring training and responded:

"There isn't a team in the National League that's better than us. The pressure's back on them if you ask me. They were on paper the best team in the division last year and they were supposed to win, and they didn’t. One, there are four other teams in our division who are going to make sure that doesn't happen, and two, has anyone ever heard of plagiarism? That was pretty good, especially coming from him. He's a quiet guy, so it was probably shocking when he said it. Not shocking in a bad way, like 'Wow, I can't believe he said that.' More like, 'Wow, he finally said something because he's a leader on that team and you definitely need to be a vocal leader."

Throughout most of the season, the Phillies and Mets battled each other for the NL East lead, along with the Florida Marlins. Going into the final season series between the two teams, former Phillie and special hitting instructor Mike Schmidt fanned the flames of the rivalry with an e-mail to manager Charlie Manuel, later posted for the entire team in the clubhouse.

"One pitch, one at bat, one play, one situation, think ‘small’ and ‘big’ things result, tough at-bats, lots of walks, stay up the middle with men on base, whatever it takes to ‘keep the line moving’ on offense, 27 outs on defense, the Mets know you’re better than they are… They remember last year. You guys are never out of a game. Welcome the challenge that confronts you this weekend. You are the stars. Good luck. #20."

Mets players reacted quickly; David Wright replied, "To each his own. He's obviously biased in his e-mails or letters. I see a starting pitcher that goes out there and throws like Brett Myers – that works much better than a rally cry from a former player." This response came a day after Myers defeated the Mets 3–0, throwing eight shutout innings and striking out ten. The Mets won the season series 11–7.

After the final season series, the Mets held onto first place until September 16, when a September surge moved the Phillies into first place. On September 19, however, the Phillies lost to the Florida Marlins while the Mets beat the Atlanta Braves to put New York back into the division lead. The results were reversed the following night, and the Phillies regained the top spot, where they would ultimately finish.

The Phillies won the NL East on September 27, while the Mets were eliminated from postseason contention the next day with a 4–2 loss to the Florida Marlins in the final game at Shea Stadium. The Milwaukee Brewers defeated the Cubs that day to clinch the NL wild card. This marked the second year in a row the Mets were eliminated from the playoffs on the last regular-season game. It also marked the first time in baseball history that a team had lost the last game of the season to miss the playoffs after holding a three-game lead in two consecutive seasons.

After victories over the Brewers and the Los Angeles Dodgers in the postseason, the Phillies went on to win the World Series over the Tampa Bay Rays.

==== 2008–2009 offseason ====
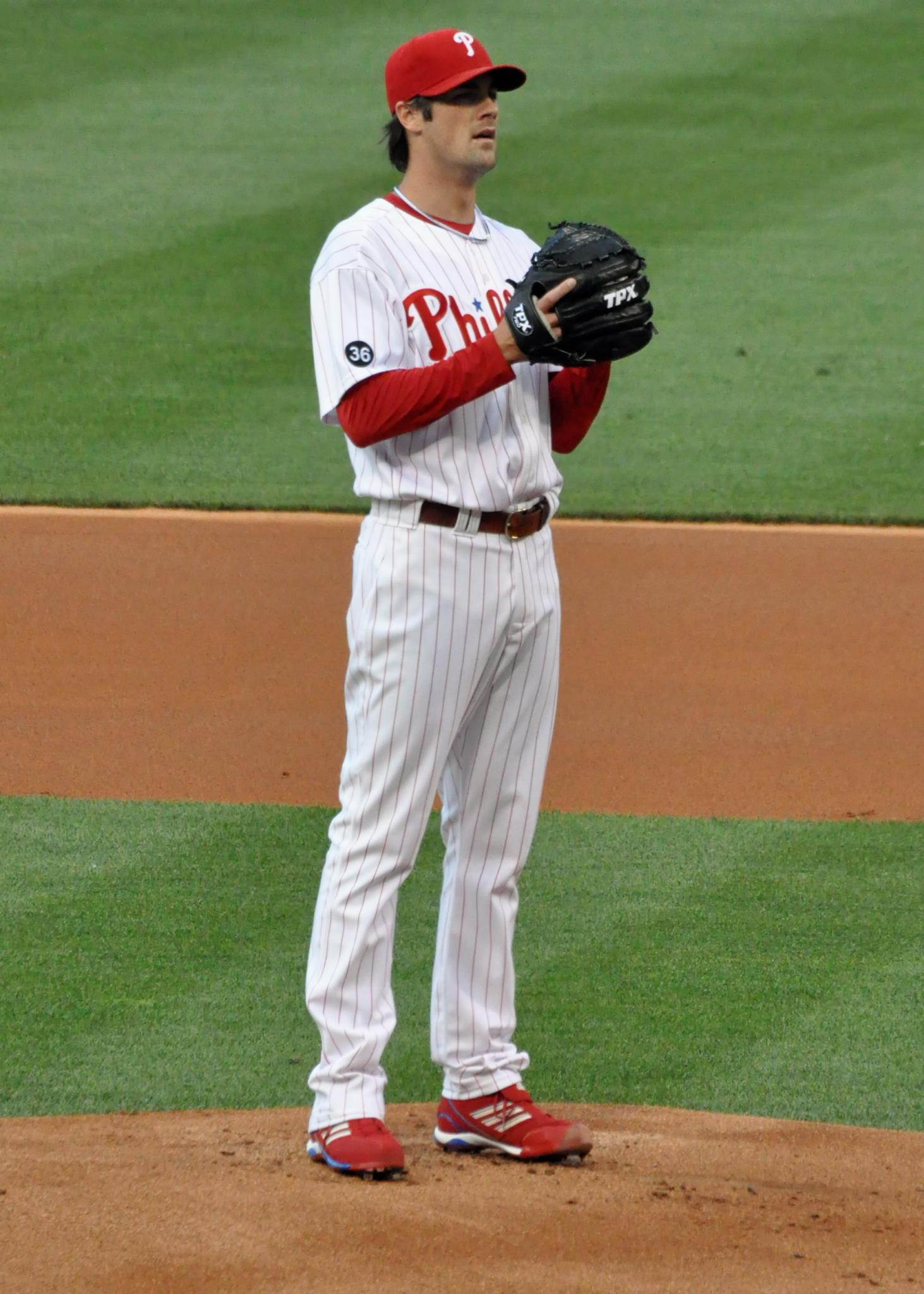
Cole Hamels called the Mets "choke artists" after the Phillies' 2008 World Series victory.

During the team's post-parade celebration on October 31 at Citizens Bank Park, Jimmy Rollins took verbal shots at the Mets organization. "A lot of things were made in the offseason", Rollins said. "We can talk about the New York Mets. They brought in that great pitcher, Johan Santana, but they forgot that it takes more than one player to bring home a championship."

Nearing the end of 2008 and the thick of the offseason, World Series MVP Cole Hamels was asked by WFAN radio hosts whether he considered the Mets "choke artists". Hamels replied, "For the past two years they've been choke artists." He explained that he considered Mets shortstop José Reyes a showboater for his post-home run displays, and that the Mets had mocked Phillies center fielder Shane Victorino for similar antics during the National League Division Series (NLDS).

On December 13, newly signed Mets closer Francisco Rodríguez added his sentiments to the fray. "Of course we're going to be the frontrunner. Of course we're going to be the team to beat", Rodriguez told reporters. "I don't want there to be a controversy. I don't want the other team to take it personally, or take it in a bad way. But I'm a really competitive guy. I like to win. If they ask me, 'Oh, which ballclub is going to win the National League East?' It's going to be the Mets. Easy question."

=== 2009–2010 ===
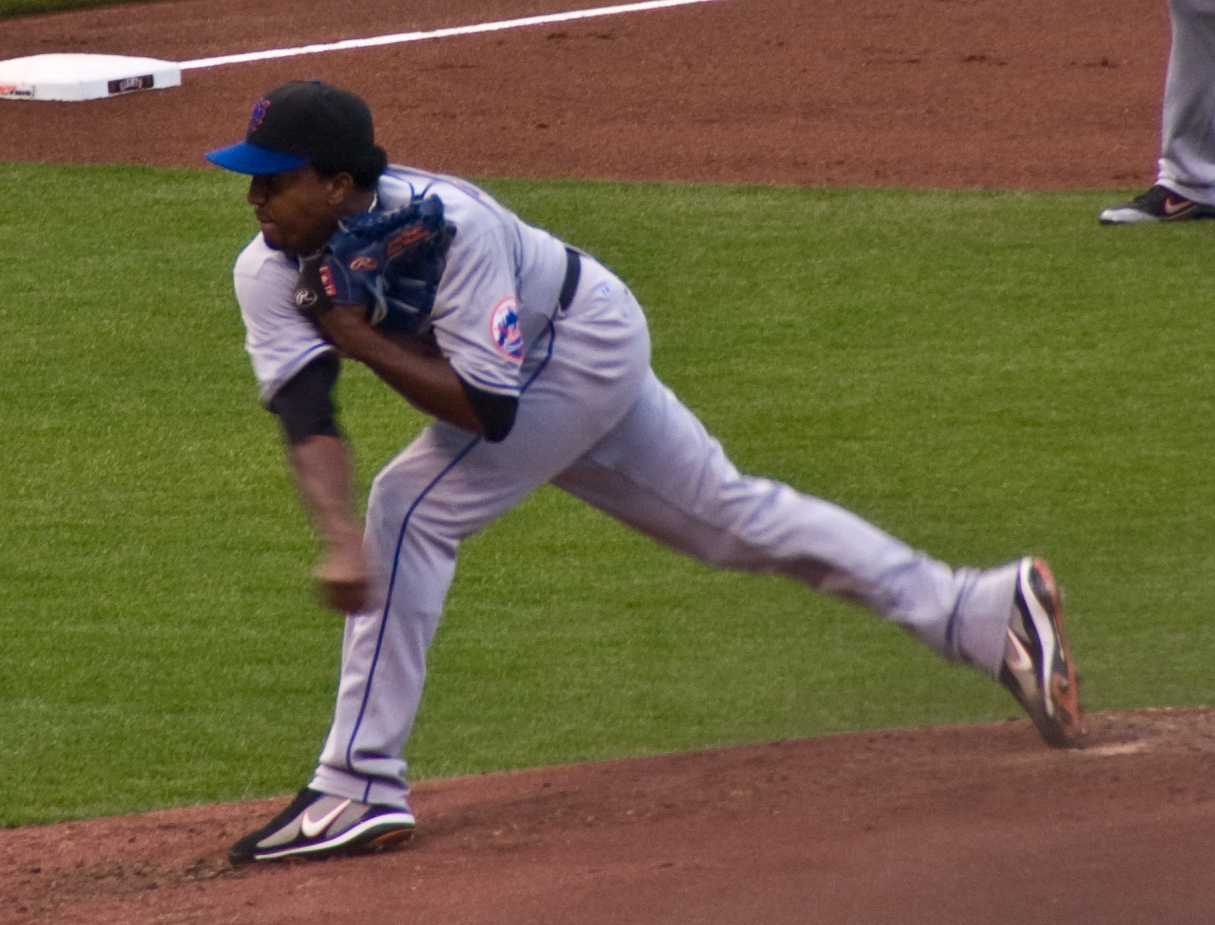
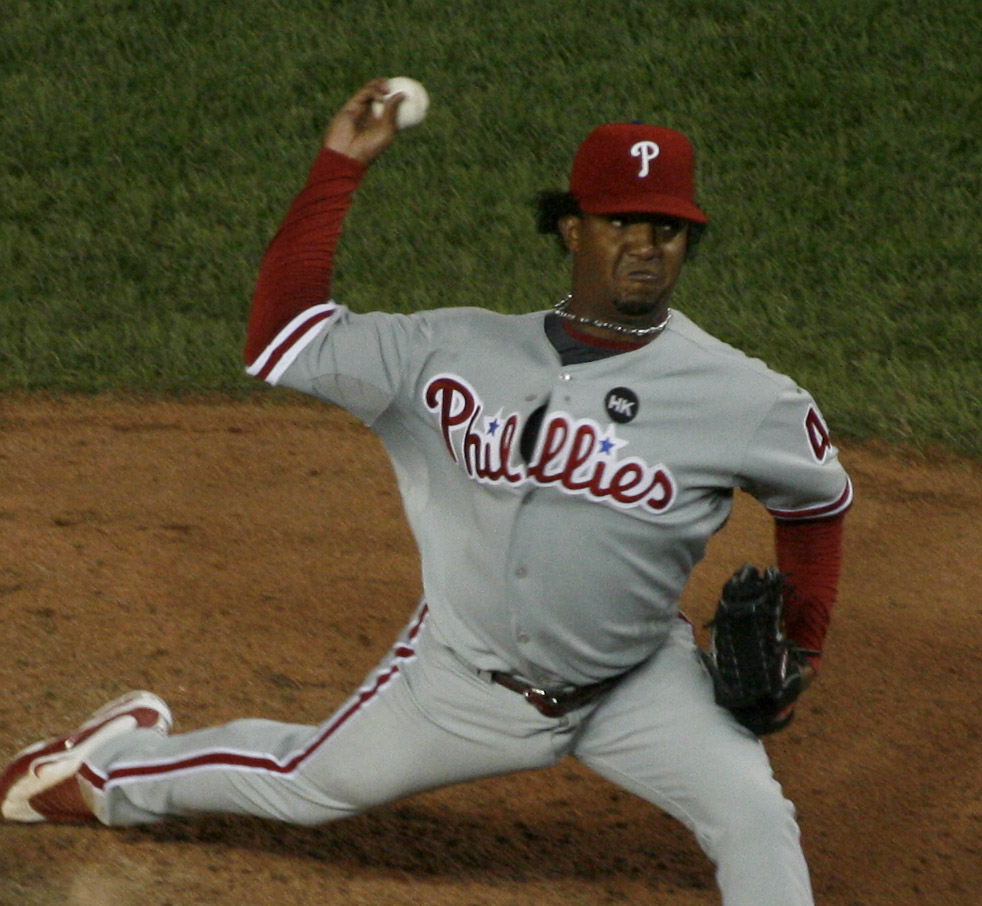
Pedro Martínez, who pitched for the Mets from 2005 to 2008, signed with the Phillies in 2009.

Throughout the first few months of the 2009 season the Mets and Phillies looked as though they would make this year into another close playoff race. By the end of May the Mets had won three out of the four games they played against each other; however, the Phillies retained a half-game lead. Both clubs struggled in June as the Phillies slumped and New York was plagued by injuries. By the end of June the Phillies had increased their division lead, but only to two and a half games.

This closeness would not continue, however, as the Phillies went on to finish with a 93–69 record, winning the division and securing the second seed in the playoffs. The Mets, on the other hand, went 33–53 from July through September and finished fourth in the NL East, 23 games behind. The Phillies would go on to win the NL pennant for the second year in a row but lost the World Series in six-games to the Mets' cross-town rivals, the New York Yankees.

One notable occurrence during the 2009 season was the Phillies adding former Mets pitcher Pedro Martínez. Martinez posted a 3.63 ERA with a 5–1 record. In his one start against the Mets, he threw six innings and gave up four earned runs.

In 2010, after leading the division standing by the end of April, the Mets again began to struggle. The Mets would not hold first place at any point after May 1, although they came close in mid-June. By the end of the season the Mets had finished 18 games behind the first place Phillies. For its part, Philadelphia was mainly engaged in a fierce division race with the Atlanta Braves, trailing them as late in the season as September 6. However, Philadelphia would surge at the end of the month and once again be crowned division champs. 2010 ultimately served as a disappointment for the Mets–Phillies rivalry.

=== 2011–2014 ===
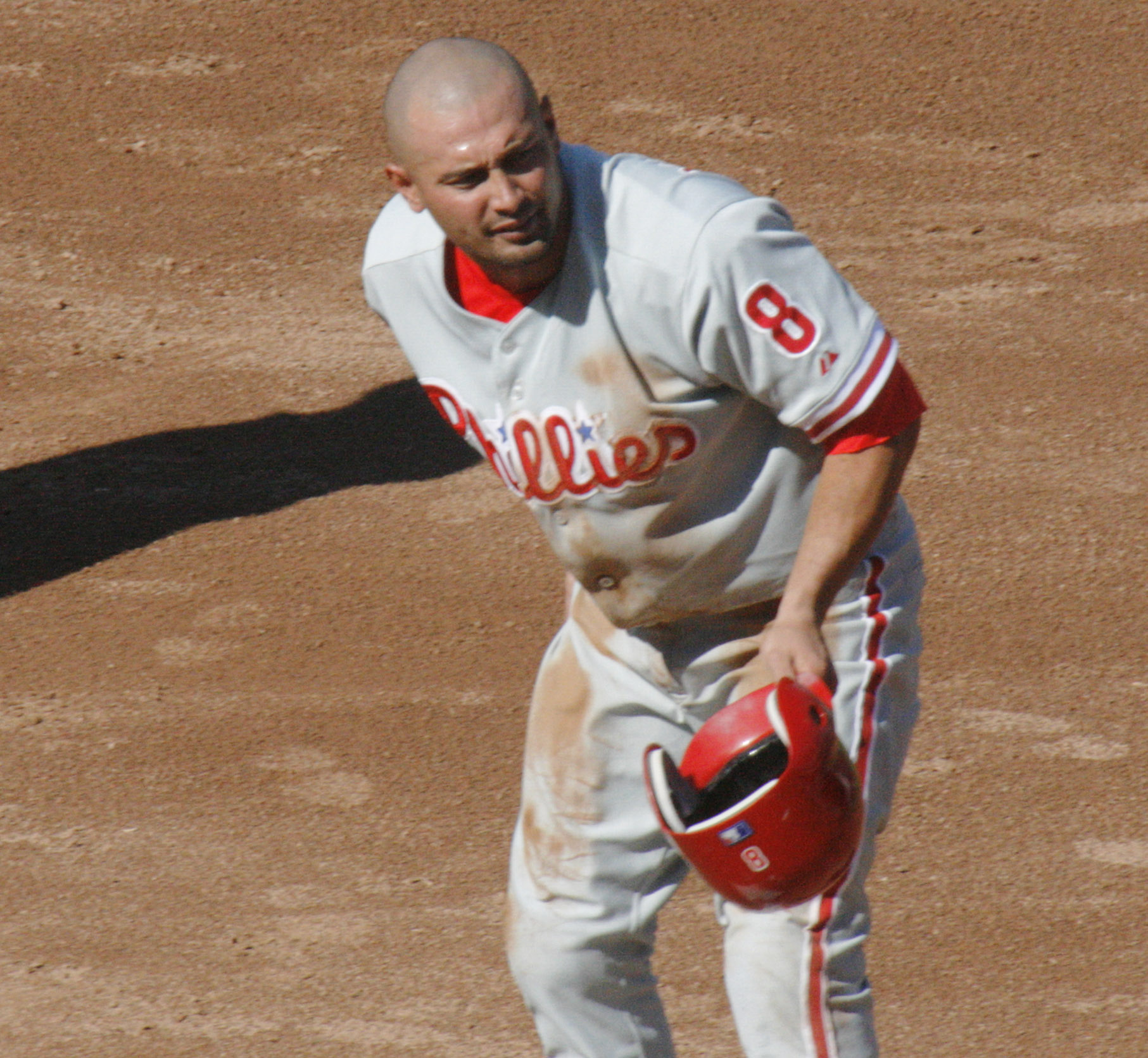
Shane Victorino broke the news of the killing of Osama bin Laden during a game between the teams.

In 2011, the Phillies won the season series against the Mets, winning 11 of 18 games. The Phillies set a record for wins in a season with 102, surpassing the previous record of 101, set back-to-back in 1976 and 1977, while the Mets finished 25 games out of first place at 77–85, in fourth place and missed the playoffs for the fifth straight year.

==== Osama Bin Laden Reactions ====
The game on May 1 in Philadelphia became a moment of unity in the rivalry between fans during the top of the ninth inning. Mets' Daniel Murphy was batting as a pinch-hitter against Phillies' reliever Ryan Madson when the fans started chanting "U-S-A!" The Phillies didn't know the reason for the chants, but in the Mets' dugout, bench coach Ken Oberkfell told Manager Terry Collins that al-Qaeda leader Osama bin Laden, the mastermind of the September 11 attacks, had been killed by United States special operations forces in Abbottabad, Pakistan. Shane Victorino later told the Phillies the news.

However, when asked how they learned about it during an on-air telephone call with Mike and Mike in the Morning on ESPN Radio the next day, he said that a trainer in the dugout broke the news. Ryan Howard called the news "an uplifting moment," while Victorino said it was "a special moment...for families...who...lost their loved ones...(on) 9/11" and "a big day in American history." On the Mets' side, David Wright called it "just an incredible moment and...you kind of come together...for a common cause", while Collins said that the Mets 2–1, 14-inning win behind Ronny Paulino's game-winning RBI double in his Mets debut was "a good win for us, and obviously a huge win for America tonight", but felt they "could have finished the game two hours ago and celebrated a little bit of it."

Mike Lopresti of USA Today called the game between the rivals "a perfect fit" when the news broke, while Adam Rubin of ESPNNewYork.com called the peace in the rivalry "fitting" for a Mets fan, and said that it drew parallels to their 3–2 win over rival Atlanta Braves on September 21, 2001 in the first major sporting event in New York City since the attacks.

==== 2012 NHL Winter Classic ====
On September 26, 2011, the day after the teams' final meeting of the season, the National Hockey League formally announced that the rivalry would be played out at Citizens Bank Park during the offseason at the 2012 NHL Winter Classic on January 2, saying it would be a showdown between the teams' hockey counterparts, the New York Rangers and the Philadelphia Flyers. Shane Victorino attended the game, which the Rangers came from behind to win, 3–2. MLB.com noted that "just like the Mets–Phillies rivalry, being able to come back and steal a game on the road was quite sweet," and added of the rivalry being played out: "What better rivalry than this? Both these teams, they're in first place (in the Atlantic Division). I'm excited to see it."

==== 2012–2014 ====
During the 2012 season, the Mets beat the Phillies ten times, including a sweep of a three-game series at Citizens Bank Park in early May in which they came from behind to win each game in the late innings. In 2013, the Mets clubhouse store in New York City started selling shirts saying, "My Ex-Wife is a Philles fan", while MLB Network aired a MasterCard/StandUp2Cancer commercial featuring Phille Phanatic and Mr. Met.

In 2014, the Mets and the Phillies met in a rare 5-game regular-season series at Citizens Bank Park. The Mets took 4 out of 5 games. Three straight games were decided in extras, with the Phillies walking off 6–5 in 14 in Game 2 and the Mets winning 5–4 in 14 and 4–3 in 11 in Games 3 and 4 respectively.

=== 2015: Phillies rebuild, Mets win Pennant ===
In 2015, the Phillies entered a rebuilding phase, trading away former stars Cole Hamels and Chase Utley mid-season. The Phillies would go on to a last place finish in the NL East, losing 99 games on the season, while the Mets would go on and win the division title.

While the rivalry was somewhat subdued by the lopsidedness of the two teams records, the rivalry did provide some moments. On April 15, Mets pitcher Matt Harvey drilled Chase Utley in the back, after a few Mets pitchers had been hit by the Phillies. On August 25, during a game at Citizens Bank Park Phillies coach Larry Bowa started yelling out of the dugout after a quick pitch by then-Mets reliever Hansel Robles while Darin Ruf was in the box not looking up and not ready for the pitch. Bowa also yelled at Mets 1st baseman Daniel Murphy over a perceived slight by Murphy's bat flip earlier in the game during a home run. Benches cleared as Bowa threatened Murphy with retaliation and was ultimately ejected from the game.

The Mets played in the NLDS against the Los Angeles Dodgers whose roster featured former Phillies players Jimmy Rollins and Chase Utley. The series featured a contentious slide in Game 2 by Utley at 2nd base, injuring Mets shortstop Rubén Tejada. The fallout created controversy on take out slides at 2nd and Utley was suspended for two games. Mets fans booed Utley loudly during the pregame for Game 3 at Citi Field, and chanted "We want Utley" after the Mets took a 10–3 lead during the game. However Utley did not appear again in the series until late in Game 5 and the Mets won the series, and eventually won the NLCS for the pennant. New York would go on to lose the World Series to the Kansas City Royals in five games.

=== 2022 ===
On April 29, 2022, the Mets threw a combined no-hitter against the Phillies, with Tylor Megill, Drew Smith, Joely Rodríguez, Seth Lugo, and Edwin Díaz completing the effort. This was the first of two combined no-hitters against the Phillies during their pennant season. The Mets and the Phillies made the postseason in the same season for the first time, but the Mets lost in the NL Wild Card Series to the San Diego Padres while the Phillies lost to the Houston Astros in the World Series.

=== 2023 ===
When the Mets unveiled NewYork-Presbyterian Hospital as its uniform sponsor for the season, team owner Steve Cohen complained that the colors of the patch were "Phillie colors", in reference to the hospital's red and white color scheme. The patch was eventually reworked to the Mets' blue, orange, and white color scheme.

=== 2024 ===
The Phillies took a huge division lead over the first two months of the season, looking to return to the World Series. Meanwhile, the Mets stumbled out the gate, falling 11 games under .500 just past the one third mark of the season. While the Phillies went on to coast to the division title, the Mets went on a fierce comeback, which had them achieving the best record in baseball over the final 107 games of the season with a 67-40 record.

On June 8–9, the two rivals faced each other in the 2024 MLB London Series; the Phillies won the first game 7–2 and the Mets won the second game 6–5. To many Mets' players, it was the London Series that marked the turning point of the season, with the first big win coming in a miracle comeback victory against the Phillies to close out the London trip. Over the course of the regular season, the Phillies edged out the Mets 7 games to 6.

==== National League Division Series ====
The Mets and Phillies met in the 2024 NLDS, their first ever postseason series. The Mets won the series in 4 games, 3–1, to advance to the NLCS.

=== 2025 ===
After the Mets and Phillies went back and forth for the NL East for much of the season, the Phillies pulled away and became the first team to clinch their division, doing so on September 15. The Mets had a historic collapse and missed the playoffs altogether that year, while the Phillies lost in the 2025 NLDS to the eventual World Series champion Los Angeles Dodgers.

== Season-by-season results ==
Mets vs. Phillies Season-by-Season Results
1960s (Phillies, 91–53)

| Season | Season series | | at New York Mets | at Philadelphia Phillies | Overall series | Notes |
|---|---|---|---|---|---|---|
| 1962 | Phillies | 14‍–‍4 | Phillies, 7‍–‍2 | Phillies, 7‍–‍2 | Phillies; 14‍–‍4 | Phillies take a 3–2 lead on May 4 in the series, a lead they would never relinquish. |
| 1963 | Phillies | 10‍–‍8 | Mets, 6‍–‍3 | Phillies, 7‍–‍2 | Phillies; 24‍–‍12 | |
| 1964 | Phillies | 15‍–‍3 | Phillies, 7‍–‍2 | Phillies, 8‍–‍1 | Phillies; 39‍–‍15 | |
| 1965 | Phillies | 11‍–‍7 | Phillies, 6‍–‍3 | Phillies, 5‍–‍4 | Phillies; 50‍–‍22 | |
| 1966 | Phillies | 11‍–‍7 | Phillies, 8‍–‍1 | Mets, 6‍–‍3 | Phillies; 61‍–‍29 | |
| 1967 | Phillies | 14‍–‍4 | Phillies, 8‍–‍1 | Phillies, 6‍–‍3 | Phillies; 75‍–‍33 | |
| 1968 | Phillies | 10‍–‍8 | Phillies, 6‍–‍3 | Mets, 5‍–‍4 | Phillies; 85‍–‍41 | |
| 1969 | Mets | 12‍–‍6 | Mets, 5‍–‍4 | Mets, 7‍–‍2 | Phillies; 91‍–‍53 | Mets win 1969 World Series |

1970s (Phillies, 97–83)

| Season | Season series | | at New York Mets | at Philadelphia Phillies | Overall series | Notes |
|---|---|---|---|---|---|---|
| 1970 | Mets | 13‍–‍5 | Mets, 6‍–‍3 | Mets, 7‍–‍2 | Phillies; 96‍–‍66 | |
| 1971 | Mets | 13‍–‍5 | Mets, 7‍–‍2 | Mets, 6‍–‍3 | Phillies; 101‍–‍79 | |
| 1972 | Mets | 13‍–‍5 | Mets, 5‍–‍4 | Mets, 8‍–‍1 | Phillies; 106‍–‍92 | |
| 1973 | Tie | 9‍–‍9 | Mets, 6‍–‍3 | Phillies, 6‍–‍3 | Phillies; 115‍–‍101 | Mets lose 1973 World Series |
| 1974 | Phillies | 11‍–‍7 | Phillies, 5‍–‍4 | Phillies, 6‍–‍3 | Phillies; 126‍–‍108 | |
| 1975 | Phillies | 11‍–‍7 | Phillies, 5‍–‍4 | Phillies, 6‍–‍3 | Phillies; 137‍–‍115 | |
| 1976 | Phillies | 13‍–‍5 | Phillies, 6‍–‍3 | Phillies, 7‍–‍2 | Phillies; 150‍–‍120 | |
| 1977 | Phillies | 13‍–‍5 | Phillies, 5‍–‍4 | Phillies, 8‍–‍1 | Phillies; 163‍–‍125 | |
| 1978 | Phillies | 12‍–‍6 | Phillies, 6‍–‍3 | Phillies, 6‍–‍3 | Phillies; 175‍–‍131 | |
| 1979 | Phillies | 13‍–‍5 | Phillies, 7‍–‍2 | Phillies, 6‍–‍3 | Phillies; 188‍–‍136 | |

1980s (Mets, 90‍–‍86)

| Season | Season series | | at New York Mets | at Philadelphia Phillies | Overall series | Notes |
|---|---|---|---|---|---|---|
| 1980 | Phillies | 12‍–‍6 | Phillies, 8‍–‍1 | Mets, 5‍–‍4 | Phillies; 200‍–‍142 | Phillies win 1980 World Series |
| 1981 | Tie | 7‍–‍7 | Mets, 5‍–‍4 | Phillies, 3‍–‍2 | Phillies; 207‍–‍149 | Strike-shortened season |
| 1982 | Phillies | 11‍–‍7 | Mets, 5‍–‍4 | Phillies, 7‍–‍2 | Phillies; 218‍–‍156 | |
| 1983 | Phillies | 12‍–‍6 | Phillies, 5‍–‍4 | Phillies, 7‍–‍2 | Phillies; 230‍–‍162 | Phillies lose 1983 World Series |
| 1984 | Mets | 10‍–‍8 | Mets, 7‍–‍2 | Phillies, 6‍–‍3 | Phillies; 238‍–‍172 | |
| 1985 | Mets | 11‍–‍7 | Mets, 7‍–‍2 | Phillies, 5‍–‍4 | Phillies; 245‍–‍183 | |
| 1986 | Phillies | 10‍–‍8 | Mets, 6‍–‍3 | Phillies, 7‍–‍2 | Phillies; 255‍–‍191 | Mets win 1986 World Series |
| 1987 | Mets | 13‍–‍5 | Mets, 8‍–‍1 | Mets, 5‍–‍4 | Phillies; 260‍–‍204 | |
| 1988 | Mets | 10‍–‍8 | Mets, 6‍–‍3 | Phillies, 5‍–‍4 | Phillies; 268‍–‍214 | |
| 1989 | Mets | 12‍–‍6 | Mets, 6‍–‍3 | Mets, 6‍–‍3 | Phillies; 274‍–‍226 | |

1990s (Phillies, 70–69)

| Season | Season series | | at New York Mets | at Philadelphia Phillies | Overall series | Notes |
|---|---|---|---|---|---|---|
| 1990 | Mets | 10‍–‍8 | Mets, 6‍–‍3 | Phillies, 5‍–‍4 | Phillies; 282‍–‍236 | |
| 1991 | Mets | 11‍–‍7 | Mets, 5‍–‍4 | Mets, 6‍–‍3 | Phillies; 289‍–‍247 | |
| 1992 | Phillies | 12‍–‍6 | Phillies, 6‍–‍3 | Phillies, 6‍–‍3 | Phillies; 301‍–‍253 | |
| 1993 | Phillies | 10‍–‍3 | Phillies, 6‍–‍1 | Phillies, 4‍–‍2 | Phillies; 311‍–‍256 | Expansion to include the Colorado Rockies and the Miami Marlins reduces the number of meetings to 13 per season. Phillies lose 1993 World Series |
| 1994 | Phillies | 6‍–‍4 | Mets, 2‍–‍1 | Phillies, 5‍–‍2 | Phillies; 317‍–‍260 | Strike-shortened season. Strike cancels postseason. MLB adds Wild Card, allowing for both teams to make the postseason in the same year. |
| 1995 | Mets | 7‍–‍6 | Phillies, 4‍–‍3 | Mets, 4‍–‍2 | Phillies; 323‍–‍267 | |
| 1996 | Mets | 7‍–‍6 | Mets, 4‍–‍2 | Phillies, 4‍–‍3 | Phillies; 329‍–‍274 | |
| 1997 | Mets | 7‍–‍5 | Mets, 4‍–‍2 | Tie, 3‍–‍3 | Phillies; 334‍–‍281 | |
| 1998 | Mets | 8‍–‍4 | Tie, 3‍–‍3 | Mets, 5‍–‍1 | Phillies; 338‍–‍289 | |
| 1999 | Tie | 6‍–‍6 | Mets, 4‍–‍2 | Phillies, 4‍–‍2 | Phillies; 344‍–‍295 | |

2000s (Phillies, 94–86)

| Season | Season series | | at New York Mets | at Philadelphia Phillies | Overall series | Notes |
|---|---|---|---|---|---|---|
| 2000 | Phillies | 7‍–‍6 | Phillies, 4‍–‍2 | Mets, 4‍–‍3 | Phillies; 351‍–‍301 | Mets lose 2000 World Series |
| 2001 | Mets | 11‍–‍8 | Tie, 5‍–‍5 | Mets, 6‍–‍3 | Phillies; 359‍–‍312 | MLB changed to an unbalanced schedule in 2001, resulting in 18‍–‍19 meetings per year |
| 2002 | Phillies | 10‍–‍9 | Phillies, 6‍–‍3 | Mets, 6‍–‍4 | Phillies; 369‍–‍321 | |
| 2003 | Phillies | 12‍–‍7 | Phillies, 7‍–‍3 | Phillies, 5‍–‍4 | Phillies; 381‍–‍328 | |
| 2004 | Phillies | 11‍–‍8 | Phillies, 6‍–‍3 | Tie, 5‍–‍5 | Phillies; 392‍–‍336 | |
| 2005 | Mets | 11‍–‍7 | Mets, 6‍–‍4 | Mets, 5‍–‍3 | Phillies; 399‍–‍347 | |
| 2006 | Mets | 11‍–‍8 | Mets, 6‍–‍3 | Tie, 5‍–‍5 | Phillies; 407‍–‍358 | |
| 2007 | Phillies | 12‍–‍6 | Phillies, 7‍–‍2 | Phillies, 5‍–‍4 | Phillies; 419‍–‍364 | |
| 2008 | Mets | 11‍–‍7 | Mets, 5‍–‍4 | Mets, 6‍–‍3 | Phillies; 426‍–‍375 | Phillies win 2008 World Series |
| 2009 | Phillies | 12‍–‍6 | Phillies, 5‍–‍4 | Phillies, 7‍–‍2 | Phillies; 438‍–‍381 | Phillies lose 2009 World Series |

2010s (Mets, 105–82)

| Season | Season series | | at New York Mets | at Philadelphia Phillies | Overall series | Notes |
|---|---|---|---|---|---|---|
| 2010 | Tie | 9‍–‍9 | Mets, 5‍–‍4 | Phillies, 5‍–‍4 | Phillies; 447‍–‍390 | |
| 2011 | Phillies | 11‍–‍7 | Phillies, 5‍–‍4 | Phillies, 6‍–‍3 | Phillies; 458‍–‍397 | |
| 2012 | Mets | 10‍–‍8 | Phillies, 6‍–‍3 | Mets, 7‍–‍2 | Phillies; 466‍–‍407 | |
| 2013 | Mets | 10‍–‍9 | Phillies, 6‍–‍4 | Mets, 6‍–‍3 | Phillies; 475‍–‍417 | |
| 2014 | Mets | 13‍–‍6 | Mets, 5‍–‍4 | Mets, 8‍–‍2 | Phillies; 481‍–‍430 | |
| 2015 | Mets | 14‍–‍5 | Mets, 8‍–‍1 | Mets, 6‍–‍4 | Phillies; 486‍–‍444 | Mets lose 2015 World Series |
| 2016 | Mets | 12‍–‍7 | Mets, 6‍–‍4 | Mets, 6‍–‍3 | Phillies; 493‍–‍456 | |
| 2017 | Mets | 12‍–‍7 | Mets, 5‍–‍4 | Mets, 7‍–‍3 | Phillies; 500‍–‍468 | |
| 2018 | Mets | 11‍–‍8 | Mets, 6‍–‍3 | Tie, 5‍–‍5 | Phillies; 508‍–‍479 | |
| 2019 | Phillies | 12‍–‍7 | Phillies, 5‍–‍4 | Phillies, 7‍–‍3 | Phillies; 520‍–‍486 | |

2020s (Mets, 55–49)

| Season | Season series | | at New York Mets | at Philadelphia Phillies | Overall series | Notes |
|---|---|---|---|---|---|---|
| 2020 | Phillies | 6‍–‍4 | Tie, 2‍–‍2 | Phillies, 4‍–‍2 | Phillies; 526‍–‍490 | Season shortened to 60 games (with 10 meetings) due to COVID-19 pandemic. |
| 2021 | Phillies | 10‍–‍9 | Mets, 6‍–‍4 | Phillies, 6‍–‍3 | Phillies; 536‍–‍499 | |
| 2022 | Mets | 14‍–‍5 | Mets, 7‍–‍2 | Mets, 7‍–‍3 | Phillies; 541‍–‍513 | Both teams qualify for the postseason in the same year for the first time. Phillies lose 2022 World Series |
| 2023 | Phillies | 7‍–‍6 | Mets, 5‍–‍1 | Phillies, 6‍–‍1 | Phillies; 548‍–‍519 | New schedule structure started this season to allow every team to play one series against every interleague team. Shortening meetings from 19 to 13 games. |
| 2024 | Phillies | 7‍–‍6 | Phillies, 4‍–‍3 | Tie, 3‍–‍3 | Phillies; 555‍–‍525 | As part of the MLB World Tour, both teams played at London Stadium in London on June 8‍–‍9. |
| 2024 NLDS | Mets | 3‍–‍1 | Mets, 2‍–‍0 | Tie, 1‍–‍1 | Phillies; 556‍–‍528 | First meeting in the postseason |
| 2025 | Mets | 7‍–‍6 | Mets, 6‍–‍0 | Phillies, 6‍–‍1 | Phillies; 562‍–‍535 | |
| 2026 | Phillies | 7‍–‍6 | Phillies, 4‍–‍3 | Tie, 3‍–‍3 | Phillies; 569‍–‍541 | |
| 2027 | Tie | 0‍–‍0 | Upcoming at Mets, May 11‍–‍13, July 22‍–‍25 | Upcoming at Phillies, May 4‍–‍6, September 3‍–‍5 | Phillies; 569‍–‍541 | |

Summary of Results

| Season | Season series | | at New York Mets | at Philadelphia Phillies | Notes |
|---|---|---|---|---|---|
| Regular season games | Phillies | 568‍–‍538 | Mets, 278‍–‍273 | Phillies, 295‍–‍260 | |
| Postseason games | Mets | 3‍–‍1 | Mets, 2‍–‍0 | Tie, 1‍–‍1 | |
| Postseason series | Mets | 1‍–‍0 | N/A | N/A | NLDS: 2024 |
| Regular and postseason | Phillies | 569‍–‍541 | Mets, 280‍–‍273 | Phillies, 296‍–‍261 | |

== Notable players that played for both teams ==
A total of 147 players have played for both franchises, including 140 batters and 72 pitchers.

| Name | Position(s) | Mets tenure | Phillies tenure |
|---|---|---|---|
| Richie Ashburn | Center fielder | 1962 | 1948–1959 |
| Tug McGraw | Pitcher | 1965–1967, 1969–1974 | 1975–1984 |
| Jerry Koosman | Pitcher | 1967–1978 | 1984–1985 |
| Bud Harrelson | Shortstop | 1965–1977 | 1978–1979 |
| Lenny Dykstra | Center fielder | 1985–1989 | 1989–1996 |
| Roger McDowell | Pitcher | 1985–1989 | 1989–1991 |
| Bobby Abreu | Right fielder | 2014 | 1998–2006 |
| Billy Wagner | Pitcher | 2006–2009 | 2004–2005 |
| Zack Wheeler | Pitcher | 2013–2014, 2017–2019 | 2020–present |
| Pedro Martínez | Pitcher | 2005–2008 | 2009 |
| Jeff Francoeur | Right fielder | 2009–2010 | 2015 |
| Noah Syndergaard | Pitcher | 2015–2019, 2021 | 2022 |
| Asdrúbal Cabrera | Infielder | 2016–2018 | 2018 |
| Jay Bruce | Right fielder | 2016–2018 | 2019–2020 |
| Taijuan Walker | Pitcher | 2021–2022 | 2023–2026 |
| Gregory Soto | Pitcher | 2025 | 2023–2024 |

== See also ==
- Major League Baseball rivalries
- Eagles–Giants rivalry
- Flyers–Rangers rivalry
- Devils–Flyers rivalry
- Flyers–Islanders rivalry
