= Duffy Fairgrounds =

Multi-Purpose building in Watertown, New York

Alex T. Duffy Fairgrounds
- Duffy Fairgrounds
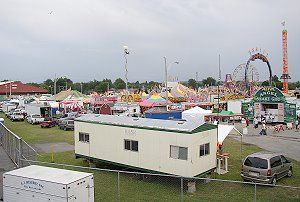
- Interactive map of Alex T. Duffy Fairgrounds
- Former names: Watertown Fairgrounds (Until 1978)
- Address: 970 Coffeen Street; Watertown, New York; United States
- Coordinates: 43.985353012178074°N 75.92772068813214°W
- Capacity: 5,000 (1948); 4,500 (1951); 3,500 (1995)
- Type: Fairgrounds
- Field size: 325-402-325
- Acreage: 67 acres
- Current use: Baseball; Fairgrounds

Construction
- Opened: 1851
- Renovated: 1936
- Rebuilt: 1948
- Project manager: Alex T. Duffy

Tenants
- Watertown Athletics (1946-1951); Watertown Pirates (1983-1988); Watertown Indians (1989-1998); Watertown Rapids (2017-present)

Website
- www.jeffcofair.org

The Alex T. Duffy Fairgrounds is a multi-purpose facility in Watertown, New York, spanning 67 acres. The stadium capacity is 3,500. It contains the longest-running fair in the United States, The Jefferson County Fair, and was named after Alex T. Duffy.

== Events ==
=== Baseball ===
A baseball park on the grounds serves as home to the Watertown Rapids of the Perfect Game Collegiate Baseball League. The ballpark has a capacity of 2,500 people and opened in 1936. It served as minor league baseball home to the 1936 Watertown Grays of the Class C level Can-Am League and Watertown Athletics of the Class C level Border League from 1946 to 1951. From 1983 until 1998 it was the home of the Watertown Pirates and Watertown Indians of the Class A level New York–Penn League. In 1999, the New York Penn-League franchise moved to Staten Island and became the Staten Island Yankees through 2019.

=== Football ===
The Watertown Red & Black play their home games at the fairgrounds. The stadium's namesake, Alex Duffy, was a longtime member of the Red & Black during its prime days as a professional team.

=== Ice hockey ===
The Northern Credit Union Community Arena is located on the fairgrounds. Since 2012, the arena has hosted a minor professional hockey team now called the Watertown Wolves of the Federal Prospects Hockey League. It was originally called the 1000 Islands Privateers when it moved from Alexandria Bay to Watertown, and it took the 2015–16 season off for arena renovations.

=== Other events ===
As its name implies, the area is home to the Jefferson County Fair in late July of each year. Built in the late 1800s, it originally included a horse racing track where the grandstands now sits.

From 1951 until 1974 it was home to the Watertown Speedway.
