= Eastern International League =

- Formerly: International Association
- Classification: Independent (1888)
- Sport: Minor League Baseball
- First season: 1888
- Folded: August 10, 1888
- President: Robert J. Eilbeck (1888)
- No. of teams: 5
- Country: United States of America
- Most titles: 1 Kingston (1888)

The Eastern International League was a minor league baseball league that played in the 1888 season. The league was a Non–Signatory League, with league franchises based in New York and Ontario. The Eastern International League succeeded the International Association. The four–team league folded during the 1888 season, with Kingston in having the best overall record.

== History ==
The Eastern International League formed for the 1888 season. The Belleville, Kingston, Oswego Starchboxes and Watertown teams began play on May 25, 1888 as charter members. Previously, Oswego had played in the 1887 International Association.

During the 1888 season, Oswego disbanded on July 4, 1888 after winning the first–half title. On July 30, 1888, the Belleville team transferred to Brockville. Watertown folded on August 10, 1888, causing the league to fold, with only three remaining franchises.

Kingston won the second–half title and had the league's best record at 25–17, playing under manager Robert Eilbeck, who also served as league president.

== Cities represented ==
- Belleville, Ontario: Belleville (1888)
- Brockville, Ontario: Brockville (1888)
- Kingston, Ontario: Kingston (1888)
- Oswego, New York: Oswego Starchboxes (1888)
- Watertown, New York: Watertown (1888)

== Standings ==
1888 Eastern International League

Team standings	W	L	PCT	GB	Managers
Kingston	25	17	.595	–	Robert Eilbeck
Belleville / Brockville	20	24	.455	6	Henderson / Silas Smith / Henderson
Watertown	14	26	.350	10	Lee Kingsley
Oswego Starchboxes	16	8	.667	NA	James Harmon

Oswego disbanded July 4; Belleville transferred to Brockville July 30; Watertown disbanded August 10
Oswego won the first half standings. Kingston won the second half standings
The league disbanded August 15.
