= Wes Curry =

American baseball player and umpire (1860–1933)

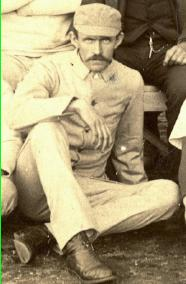
- Umpire/Pitcher
- Born: April 1, 1860; Wilmington, Delaware, US
- Died: May 19, 1933 (aged 73); Philadelphia, Pennsylvania, US
- Batted: Unknown Threw: Unknown

MLB debut
- August 6, 1884, for the Richmond Virginians

Last MLB appearance
- August 8, 1884, for the Richmond Virginians

MLB statistics
- Pitching record: 0-2
- Games: 2
- Earned run average: 5.06
- Stats at Baseball Reference

Teams
- Richmond Virginians (1884)

Wesley Curry (April 1, 1860 – May 19, 1933) was an American pitcher and umpire in who played one season in the major leagues for the Richmond Virginians of the American Association before officiating for six seasons in the majors between 1885 and 1898.

== Playing career ==
Born in Wilmington, Delaware, Curry joined the Virginians during the 1884 season, and pitched in just two games, both of which were complete game losses. The first game was a 4–5 loss to the Philadelphia Athletics on August 6, and the other game was a 2–9 loss to the Brooklyn Grays on August 8. He never pitched in the major leagues again, and his spot in the pitching rotation was occupied by Pete Meegan for the remainder of the season.

== Umpire career ==
Curry began his major league umpiring career in 1885, a year after his playing career had ended, when he signed with the National League. He umpired 39 games that first season, and 51 games the following season, also with the National League. For the 1887 season, he umpired in the American Association, also a major league at the time, and umpired 61 games, all of which, as were his first two seasons, were as the sole umpire on the field, as was the practice.

That season in the Association saw Curry make a controversial call, yet it led to the institution of an official rule which still lasts to this day. The play in question happened in a game that pitted the Louisville Colonels against the Brooklyn Grays, when during the game, Louisville's Reddy Mack crossed home plate after a teammate had hit safely. After Mack had crossed the plate, he deliberately interfered with Brooklyn's catcher long enough so that two other Colonels had also crossed the plate. Since Mack had prevented the catcher from making any further plays, Curry ruled that the first baserunner after Mack to score was out, and then disallowed the other run that followed. The rules stated, at the time, that a baserunner could not interfere with a fielder, but Mack argued that since he had scored, he was no longer a baserunner, therefore he was not in violation of any rules. Curry's decision, although not in the rules, demonstrated that the evolution of the game's rules sometimes has to be made at the moment to protect the game's integrity. The rule that came from this decision became Rule 7.09(e), later changed to Rule 6.01(a)5.

The next season Curry umpired at the major league level was in 1889 in the National League, calling a career-high 110 games, 16 as the field umpire when both major leagues began to experiment with a two-umpire system, one behind the catcher, and one behind the pitcher. In 1890, Curry returned to the Association and umpired 56 games. After that season, he did not return to the majors again until 1898 when he umpired 62 games in the National League, 52 of them in the field. His six-year career totals include 382 games, with 72 in the field, and he was behind the plate for a no-hitter on August 29, 1885, when Charlie Ferguson of the Philadelphia Quakers threw his gem against the Providence Grays.

== Post-career ==
Wes died at the age of 73 in Philadelphia and is interred at Arlington Cemetery in Drexel Hill, Pennsylvania.
