= Watertown Pirates =

- 1983–1998; Watertown, New York

Minor league affiliations
- Class: Class A Short Season (1983–1998)
- League: New York–Penn League (1983–1998)

Major league affiliations
- Team: Cleveland Indians (1989–1998); Pittsburgh Pirates (1983–1988)

Team data
- Name: Watertown Indians (1989–1998); Watertown Pirates (1983–1988)
- Mascot: Blizzard the Polar Bear (1996-1998)
- Ballpark: Duffy Fairgrounds

The Watertown Pirates were a Short-Season Class-A minor league baseball team located in Watertown, New York. The team played in the New York–Penn League from 1983 to 1998. They played their home games at the Duffy Fairgrounds Ball Park.

From 1983 until 1988 the club was affiliated with the Pittsburgh Pirates. Some notable Pirates, players from this era are Tim Wakefield, Jay Buhner, and Moisés Alou. In 1989 the team became an affiliate of the Cleveland Indians and were renamed the Watertown Indians. The team relocated to Staten Island, New York for the 1999 season and became the Staten Island Yankees.

== Notable alumni ==
- Moises Alou (1986-1987) 6 x MLB All-Star
- Jay Buhner (1983) MLB All-Star
- Sean Casey (1995) 3 x MLB All-Star
- Felix Fermin (1983)
- Brian Giles (1990) 2 x MLB All-Star
- Steve Kline (1993)
- Orlando Merced (1986-1987)
- Dave Mlicki (1990)
- Steve Soliz (1993)
- Kelly Stinnett (1990)
- Tim Wakefield (1988) MLB All-Star; 200 MLB Wins
- John Wehner (1988)
