= Charlie Ferguson (1880s pitcher) =

American baseball player (1863–1888)

Charles Ferguson
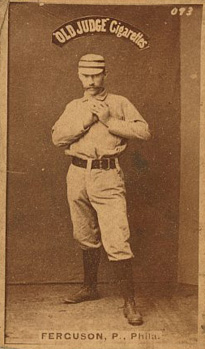
- Pitcher
- Born: April 17, 1863; Charlottesville, Virginia, U.S.
- Died: April 29, 1888 (aged 25); Philadelphia, Pennsylvania, U.S.
- Batted: Both Threw: Right

MLB debut
- May 1, 1884, for the Philadelphia Phillies

Last MLB appearance
- October 8, 1887, for the Philadelphia Phillies

MLB statistics
- Win–loss record: 99–64
- Earned run average: 2.67
- Strikeouts: 728
- Stats at Baseball Reference

Teams
- Philadelphia Phillies (1884–1887)

Career highlights and awards
- Pitched a no-hitter on August 29, 1885

Charles J. Ferguson (April 17, 1863 – April 29, 1888) was an American right-handed pitcher in Major League Baseball who played his entire four-year career for the Philadelphia Phillies. When not pitching, he increasingly played in the outfield and – in his final season – at second base.

== Career ==
Born in Charlottesville, Virginia, he played baseball for the University of Virginia in 1882, although he was never a student there. He also played for the Virginia representative in the Eastern League, with his team winning the championship. Ferguson made his major league debut with the Quakers in 1884. Philadelphia finished 6th in the National League that season, and Ferguson had a win/loss record of 21-25. That was the only season in which he produced a losing record, and he had his highest earned run average with 3.54.

The next season, his record improved to 26-20, and his ERA dropped to 2.22, while Philadelphia improved in the standings, finishing third in 1885. On August 29, he pitched a no-hitter against the Providence Grays, a 1-0 victory at the Phillies' Recreation Park.

He continued his dominance in the 1886 season, winning 30 games and again lowering his ERA, this time to 1.98, good for second in the NL behind Henry Boyle of the St. Louis Maroons. In 1887, he won 22 games and had a 3.00 ERA. That same season, he played 27 games at second base, and had 264 at bats. Along with his 22 victories, he led the team in runs batted in with 85, and his .337 batting average would have led his team as well had his total plate appearances been enough to qualify for the batting title.

== Death ==
Before the 1888 baseball season, he contracted typhoid fever and subsequently died in Philadelphia. He is interred in Maplewood Cemetery in his hometown of Charlottesville. For the 1888 season, the Phillies, Washington Nationals, New York Giants and Boston Beaneaters wore a black crepe on their left sleeves to commemorate Ferguson. In 1931, Wilbert Robinson rated Ferguson as the fifth-best player to that point in baseball history.

== See also ==
- List of baseball players who died during their careers
- List of Major League Baseball annual saves leaders
- List of Major League Baseball no-hitters

Achievements
Preceded by John Clarkson	No-hitter pitcher May 1, 1886	Succeeded by Al Atkinson
