= E. Wallace Chadwick =

American politician

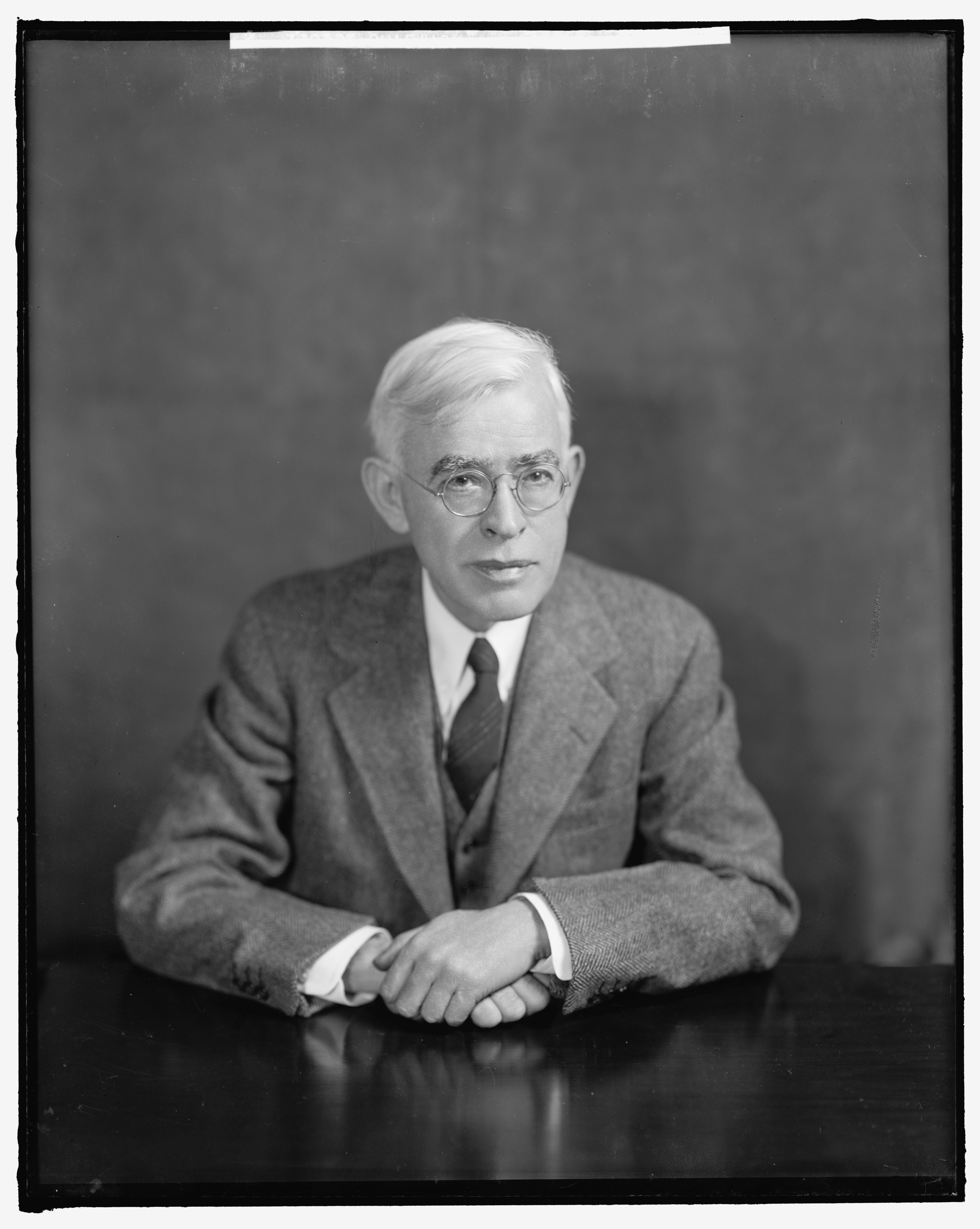

Member of the U.S. House of Representatives from Pennsylvania's 7th district
- In office January 3, 1947 – January 3, 1949
- Preceded by: James Wolfenden
- Succeeded by: Benjamin F. James

Personal details
- Born: January 17, 1884 Vincennes, Indiana, US
- Died: August 18, 1969 (aged 85)
- Party: Republican

Edward Wallace Chadwick (January 17, 1884 – August 18, 1969) was an American politician from Indiana who served as a Republican member of the U.S. House of Representatives for Pennsylvania's 7th congressional district from 1947 to 1949.

E. Wallace Chadwick was born in Vincennes, Indiana, and moved with his parents to Chester, Pennsylvania in 1890. He graduated from the University of Pennsylvania in 1906, and from the law school of the same university in 1910. He was a member of Phi Beta Kappa. He was president judge of the Delaware County Orphan's Court in 1945.

He was elected as a Republican to the 80th United States Congress, but was an unsuccessful candidate for renomination in 1948. In 1954 he was named chief counsel of special Senate committee to study censure charges against Senator Joseph McCarthy.

== Early life and education ==
E. Wallace Chadwick was born in Vincennes, Indiana and moved with his parents to Chester, Pennsylvania in 1890. He graduated from Chester High School in 1902, the University of Pennsylvania with a B.A. in 1906 and the University of Pennsylvania Law School with a LL.B in 1910. He was admitted to the Delaware County bar in 1910. He began practicing law in Chester, representing Governor William Sproul, as well as many major corporations. He also served two years as the President of the county bar association. His first foray into politics was in 1940 when he organized Willkie for President clubs in the county, as an independent Republican.

== 1945 court appointment ==
On January 19, 1945, Chadwick was the choice of state Senate Majority Leader Weldon Brinton Heyburn to fill the remaining year of a vacancy for president judge of the Delaware County Orphans Court. He was then nominated by Governor Edward Martin and was approved by the state senate 48 to 0.

Judge Chadwick then announced his intention to run that year for the full ten-year term. But, since Heyburn and Martin had deliberately acted independently of John J. McClure, chairman of the Delaware County Board of Republican Supervisors (known as the War Board), Chadwick would face an uphill fight in the primary election. Even though until then, it was the War Board's policy to endorse a sitting judge for reelection, McClure evidently would not even allow a small breath of political independence in the county.

Congressman James Wolfenden, who was by then considered to be one of the three most powerful leaders in the county party, with McClure and Haverford leader Tom Weidemann being the other two, debated whether to support the endorsed slate or not. On April 5, after weeks of deliberating, Wolfenden agreed to support the entire ticket, with a payback from the party in the candidacy of his close friend, Clarence Pepper of Upper Darby, for county controller.

After a strenuous campaign, in which McClure gave orders to party workers to "get out the vote or else", had each polling place covered by six workers, and spent a whopping $75,000, Chadwick was narrowly defeated by War Board-endorsed candidate E. Leroy van Roden and would serve only until the end of the year. The tally was 29,808 for Chadwick to 31,428 for the winner. However, in losing, Chadwick polled some impressive results, carrying Swarthmore by 732 to 57, but much more importantly, in a slap to Wolfenden, lost Upper Darby by only 1,105 votes. But, Chadwick would not be finished with politics by any stretch of the imagination.

== Election of 1946 ==
On February 13, 1946, hours before Wolfenden's press release announcing his retirement from Congress was received by the Chester Times, Chadwick, by coincidence, issued a release of his own declaring his candidacy. Indeed, five days earlier, with the approval of the former judge, nominating petitions had been circulated by his supporters. But, with Wolfenden's departure, other Republicans were interested in the $10,000 a year job also, among them state representative James, who filed petitions of his own for Congress, instead of running for another term in Harrisburg. Even though it was rumored that McClure had promised the seat to James two years earlier, on March 8, the party endorsed a federal labor mediator, James F. Dewey, rather than James.

Declaring to the voters, "I want you to reclaim Delaware County from the stigma of McClurism", the 62-year-old Chadwick eventually nosed out James Dewey by only 287 votes out of 76,543 cast, according to unofficial results. He was able to pull off this narrow victory over the county machine by carrying 31 of the 49 municipalities in the congressional district, especially the larger towns of Haverford (3,919 to 3,604), Lansdowne (1,755 to 703), Ridley Township (1,363 to 1,145), Springfield (963 to 761), Swarthmore (a whopping 817 to 172), and most surprisingly, Wolfenden's Upper Darby (8,669 to 6,734).

His showing in Chester was even respectable, a loss of only two-to-one 9,131 to 4,540. Also, two state legislative candidates, who ran on the Chadwick ticket, Marine veteran Walter F. Layer of Ridley Park and former state representative T. Jay Sproul, of Nether Providence, won, squeezing past William H. Milliken, of Sharon Hill, later to be congressman, and Samuel Walker of Upper Darby. The third at-large seat was won by McClure candidate incumbent Ellwood J. Turner, also of Nether Providence.

Perhaps all of the thousands of veterans who returned from fighting for freedom overseas saw for the first time that their own local government was not being true to the American principles of political freedom and democracy and opted for a change. With this narrow victory, Chadwick has the distinction of being the only person to defeat the War Board as a declared independent in a countywide Republican primary for Congress, or for any major office, for that matter.

In the fall of 1946, the Republican campaign battle cry to the voters was "Had enough?", in response to fourteen years of Democratic rule and the difficult postwar adjustment period, which included soaring inflation, numerous union strikes and the "Red scare", the fear of communists in our government. The Chester Times ran a headline, stating: "Only Mystery of Election is Size of GOP Majority", which summed up the view of most political observers.

Once again, Vernon O'Rourke was the Democratic nominee, but unlike the previous election, he generally maintained a low profile, as Democrats across the nation were forced to the defensive.

In October, Chadwick, in one of his frequent radio addresses, which must have been a new experience for county residents who were used to a less visible candidate, called for a Republican House majority. He stated that "Congress needs more than an appeaser - a comprehension of the nation's problems, a desire to serve America and my people of Delaware County that transcends any thought of profit to myself..."

The Media League of Women Voters forum on October 18 was generally a low-key affair, with positions on several foreign and domestic issues given by both candidates. Regarding the hot issue of whether the wartime price controls should be lifted, Chadwick was emphatically in favor, while O'Rourke took the traditional Democratic view that the controls should be retained.

Arthur Bretherick, chairman of the county Republican committee, gave a speech in which a ludicrous charge was made, apparently linking the Democrats to the Communists. "Soviet Moscow in an official radio broadcast to the U.S. has demanded the defeat of Edward Martin for U.S. senate, James H. Duff for governor, E. Wallace Chadwick for Congress, as well as our other candidates. Let's give Stalin and Tito our answer on Tuesday with a great Republican majority." (There was no indication whether Soviet dictator Stalin or Yugoslavian leader Tito responded.)

Although registered Republicans outnumbered the Democrats by 152,367 to 27,719, the Democrats predicted that O'Rourke would beat Chadwick by about 5,000 votes.

Chadwick easily defeated his Democratic challenger, 76,021 to 38,253 in the great Republican landslide of 1946. The G.O.P. was resoundingly returned to the majority, seizing fifty-six additional House seats and thirteen in the Senate. The new lineup was 246–188 in the House and 51–45 in the Senate.

In Pennsylvania, the G.O.P. was still firmly in the driver's seat, giving Senator Guffey a win over his opponent, while James H. Duff, won the governorship over John S. Rice, 1.828 million to 1.270 million. Further, the Democrats would be sending five congressmen to Washington from the keystone state, while the G.O.P. had 28. This would be the last election in which the Republicans would command such an overwhelming lead over the Democrats in Pennsylvania.

Because of the Democratic lock on the ten former states of the Confederacy, the "Solid South", it was not always easy for the Republicans to pick up enough seats in other regions to gain numerical control of the House. In 1946, there were no Republicans serving in the House out of 95 seats in the deep South. In the border states, the Democrats also led, 30 - 23.

To more than offset this advantage, the Republicans captured 135 out of 180 seats in the larger states and had a huge margin in the relatively sparsely populated farm belt. As the Democrats continued to make inroads in these normally Republican states, the former would be assured control of the House for the next three decades.

== Record in Washington ==
The Eightieth Congress was the first Republican majority since 1928: Joseph W. Martin of Massachusetts was elected Speaker of the House and Wallace H. White of Maine was elected Senate Majority Leader.

Congressman Chadwick went to Washington on January 3, 1947, and established a typically conservative Republican voting record. He sought to maintain higher visibility before the voters than either his predecessor or successor did. He introduced bills to protect GI insurance and relegate to the states all federal interest in coastal tidelands. A vigorous anti-Communist, he strongly defended the appropriation for the House Un-American Activities Committee.

Some of his votes on major legislation were: the Labor Disputes Act, establishing a Mediation Board (Y); the now well-known Taft-Hartley Act, which curbed some union abuses and was passed over President Truman's veto (Y); the constitutional amendment to limit a president to two terms, (Y); extending rent controls, (Y); reducing income taxes, (Y); aid to Greece and Turkey to resist Communist aggression, (Y); to admit Hawaii as a state (N); an Anti-Poll Tax bill (Y).

He brought the office of congressman more up-to-date by adopting a policy of answering personally every piece of correspondence he received from his constituents. "After all, if people can't get help from their public officers when they need it, they may well conclude that the subversionists are right, and that democracy...is really a farce so far as the little guy is concerned," Chadwick said in another radio address to his constituents.

== The battle for a second term ==
On March 31, 1948, in a speech to the House, Congressman Chadwick vociferously defended the European Recovery Plan, otherwise known as the Marshall Plan. "If there ever was a bill before the House in the two short years of my service here with which I have no difficulty, it is this bill for European recovery," he declared. "It is the only plan (to save Europe from Communist domination) that is offered short of a shooting war."

He also tempered his remarks by stating he was confident that the American and Soviet people could find common grounds for settling their political differences peaceably.

His speech was described by the News of Delaware County as "ringing, bluntly worded...that drew salvos of applause from the floor and a packed gallery, as well as personal commendation from Democratic Minority Leader Sam Rayburn".

None of this really mattered back home in the smoke-filled living room of John McClure. The War Board had selected former state representative Benjamin James to oppose Chadwick and a bitter primary fight ensued, with Chadwick supporting Guy G. deFuria for state senator and two incumbent state representatives and a third independent Republican, Carl E. Mau.

The county newspapers took a pro-Chadwick stance, often giving his statements and frequent radio addresses prominent front-page coverage. At one point, charges flew that the War Board had a billboard erected in Chester that read: "A VOTE FOR GUY deFURIA IS A VOTE FOR A DIRTY GOVERNMENT. WE KNOW HIS KIND." The Chester Times story covering this read: "Smear Billboard Against deFuria Erected in City". McClure was so moved by the story that he wrote a letter to the editor, which was published on the front page, denying personal responsibility for the billboard, blaming the incident on a campaign worker who had a personal grudge against deFuria. He further admonished Congressman Chadwick, stating "Even in a political campaign people have the right to expect common honesty in a candidate."

To its credit, the Times printed Chadwick's rebuttal next to the letter, along with a statement from the newspaper, which read in part: "The fact remains that Mr. McClure is responsible for the acts of his agents just as he is responsible for the worst campaign of smear which present members of the Chester Times' staff have ever witnessed."

Another controversy ensued on April 21, when a Republican congressman from Philadelphia, George W. Sarbacher, Jr., addressed a rally held by McClure at the Media Armory and spoke against Chadwick. "This country badly needs veterans of the caliber and ability and forthrightedness of Ben James," Sarbacher, a former Marine captain who was first elected in 1946 while still on active duty, told the crowd of 1,500.

According to the Daily Times, "it is the first time in the memory of the oldest members of the delegation that one Pennsylvania representative has gone into another's district to campaign against him." What puzzled observers was that the relationship between Sarbacher, at age 28, the youngest member of the Congress, and the much older Chadwick had been totally amicable. There was widespread belief that the Philadelphia congressman had been ordered to appear at the rally by McClure's counterpart, Austin Meehan, boss of the huge city G.O.P. machine. According to the Philadelphia Inquirer, members of the state's Republican delegation were "very bitter" and intended to protest this action to Governor James H. Duff. At their weekly luncheon in Washington, no formal action was taken by the congressmen to sanction Sarbacher, due to the presence of guests, including some students and former congressmen Wolfenden and Roland Kinzer of Lancaster County. Wolfenden was reported to have been very ill, having attended the luncheon in a wheel chair. Congressmen Lichtenwalner, Bucks County, McConnell, Montgomery County, and Hugh Scott of Philadelphia demanded a "showdown" with the Governor.

As a result, Sarbacher was reportedly "placed on ice for a year", receiving no assignments from the delegation. He was then defeated in the general election by William J. Green, Jr., as Meehan's machine continued to lose ground to the Democrats.

Also, in April, Chadwick sued McClure to prevent the latter's use of the name of the Republican Party of Delaware County on campaign literature. The effort of the McClure organization to drape themselves with the cloak of decent and honorable Republicans is illegal... and it constitutes deliberate fraud against the Republican voters of Delaware County," Chadwick charged in one of his customary radio addresses. "Under the law, and under the rules of the Republican party, the Republican Primary belongs to all qualified Republican voters," he continued. "There are plenty of people who think I am a better Republican than McClure. At least, I have never brought my party into disrepute..." Apparently, the county judge hearing the case did not share those views and dismissed the case.

He also gave another radio speech, playing on public fears of Communist subversion, denouncing Communism as the "deadly enemy" of America, "godless" and out to "conquer the world". Perhaps due to his votes for a strong national defense, he was endorsed by John G. Pew, the wealthy president of Sun Shipbuilding.

National columnist Drew Pearson even wrote that House Republicans were rooting for Chadwick's reelection. Pearson stated that they were "hoping he will not be replaced by another cypher", since his predecessor, Wolfenden, was not very visible in Washington. Colleague Congressman Plumley of Vermont even wrote a letter of support to the Times, but none of the support and accolades outside of the district really mattered. What mattered was the support of one man, McClure, which Chadwick simply did not have.

The Chester Times invited the four candidates for Congress and state senate to issue final statements on election eve. Congressman Chadwick's statement of 364 words stated that his "record is an open book" and that "opposition to me stems solely from factional politics". He decried the misrepresentation of his record as favoring annexation of the suburbs by Philadelphia. "If McClure and his candidate for Congress had any desire to be fair in this campaign, he would have told you how Ben James would have voted differently than I voted, had he been in Congress...They cannot tell you that I ever voted for any single law which was not beneficial to the people of this county..."

In contrast, the low-profile James issued a terse, sixteen word statement: "We will win. I am confident the Republican voters will nominate me by a substantial majority." Guy deFuria's statement was about as lengthy as Chadwick's, charging that the county G.O.P. chairman, Arthur Bretherick sent letters to "state job-holders threatening their jobs in violation of the governor's announced position of non-interference in Primary elections...Among those threatened are Civil Service employees (protected against political interference by law) and persons subject to the Federal Hatch Act."

DeFuria's opponent for state senator, and later to be congressman himself, G. Robert Watkins, also issued a sixteen word statement similar to that of James.

When the results were tallied, Chadwick had lost to the colorless James, by a sizable 47,790 to 40,165, according to the Times. This time, his losses in the bigger towns were too much to be overcome by his popularity in the smaller ones. He lost Haverford Twp by 1,100 votes, Upper Darby by 600, his opponent's hometown of Radnor by over 1,100 votes, but ironically, improved his showing in Chester by 600 votes.

His running mates for state office also lost. Once again, the McClure Machine proved that once all of the stops were pulled in an election, it was invincible.

In a front-page editorial on April 28, the Times stated that Chadwick was defeated "because he did not conform to the will of one individual, namely McClure. Money and effort must be spent like water to suppress any change in the pattern of machine dictatorship which has dominated and continues to dominate both Delaware County and Chester."

It was clear to many that the loss of such an able and dedicated public servant was another sorry chapter in the saga of county politics.

== Service after leaving Congress ==
After he left office in 1949, Chadwick returned to his private law practice in Chester and served in 1954 as chief counsel to the Senate committee investigating Senator Joseph R. McCarthy.

In 1954, he received an honorary doctorate of laws degree from the Pennsylvania Military College in Chester, Pennsylvania.

In 1956, Secretary of State John Foster Dulles named Chadwick to a seven-member panel to review the records of all career foreign service officers. On August 18, 1969, he died in Chester, Pennsylvania.

== Sources ==
- United States Congress. "E. Wallace Chadwick (id: C000268)". Biographical Directory of the United States Congress.
- The Political Graveyard

U.S. House of Representatives
Preceded by James Wolfenden	Member of the U.S. House of Representatives from Pennsylvania's 7th congressional district 1947–1949	Succeeded by Benjamin F. James
