= Arlington Cemetery (Pennsylvania) =

Cemetery in Drexel Hill, Upper Darby Township, Delaware County

Coordinates: 39.955°N 75.292°W

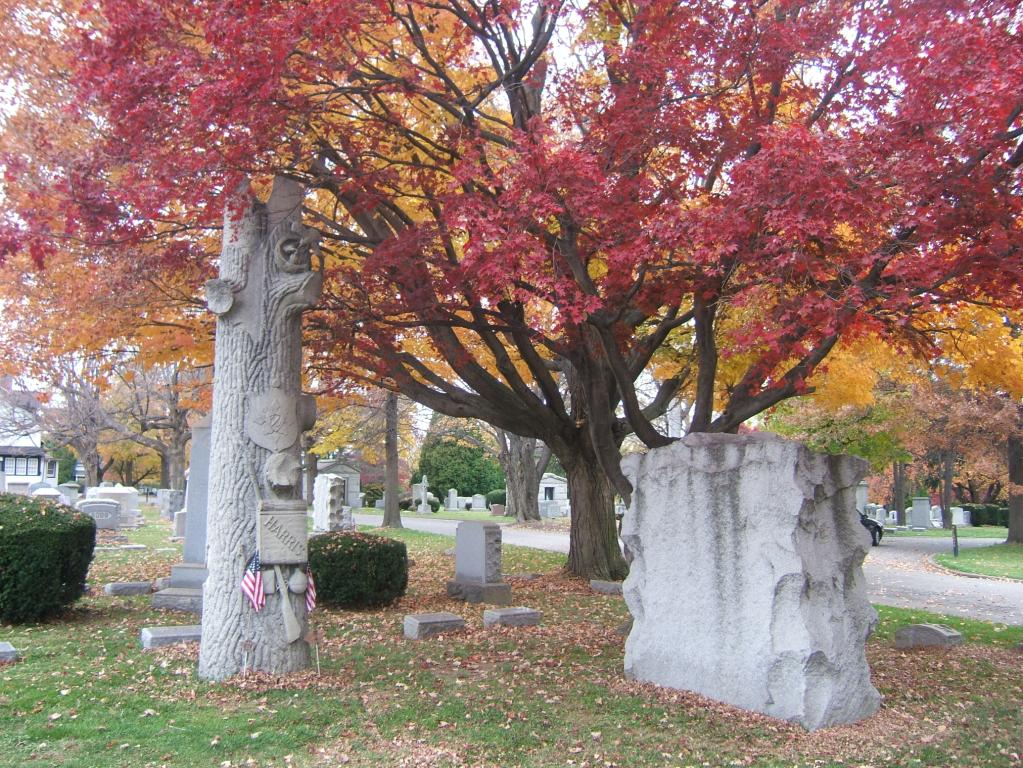
Arlington Cemetery in autumn

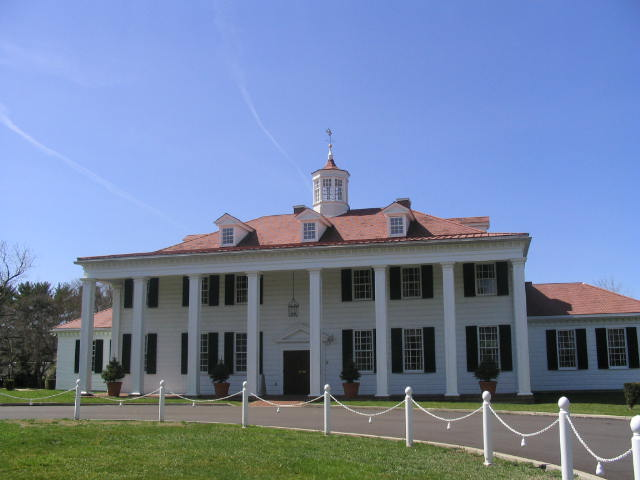
Mount Vernon Office

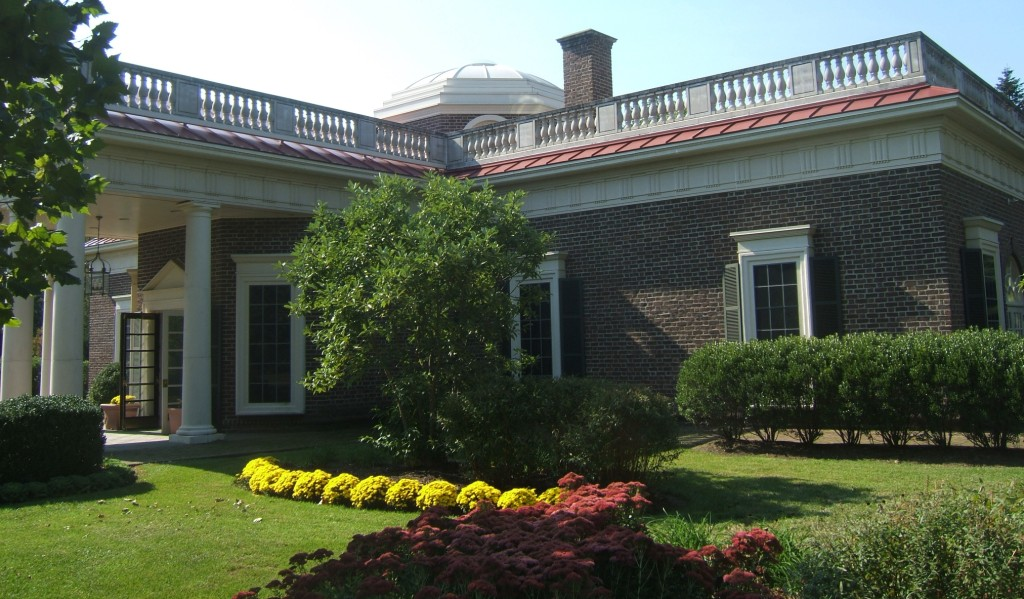
Monticello Mausoleum

Arlington Cemetery is a cemetery in the Drexel Hill neighborhood of Upper Darby Township, Pennsylvania.

== Overview ==
The Arlington Cemetery Company was founded in 1895. The cemetery occupies roughly 130 acres (0.53 km^{2}). on State Road in Drexel Hill, Upper Darby Township, Pennsylvania, United States.

The Arlington Cemetery now consists of the Mount Vernon Office, Topitzer Funeral Home, Williamsburg Chapel, The Underground Railroad Museum, The Museum of Mourning Art, The Garden Mausoleum, The Monticello Mausoleum, and a greenhouse. In addition, the cemetery itself is divided up into about 18 sections, each individually named.

== Monticello Mausoleum ==
The Monticello Mausoleum is loosely modeled after the original Virginia home of Thomas Jefferson. There is a bronze bell under the dome that was cast in the foundry of Paul Revere. The bell was originally made for a church in Vermont, but was later moved to Pennsylvania.

== Williamsburg Chapel ==
The Williamsburg Chapel is a non-denominational chapel.

== Notable burials ==
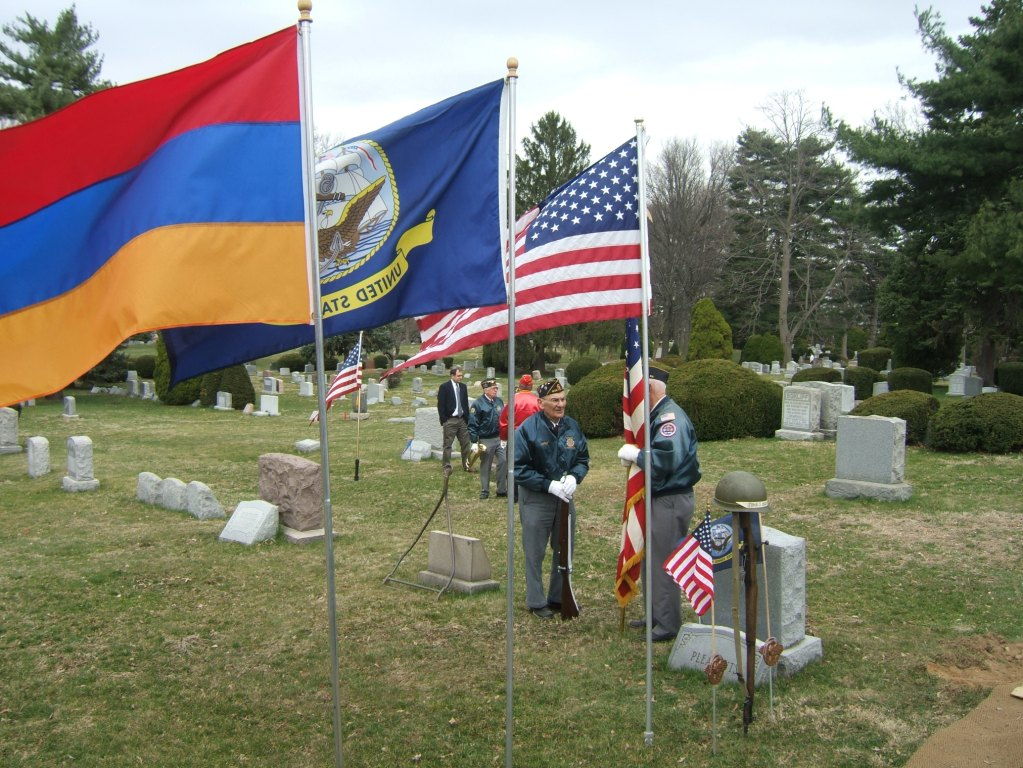
Veterans visiting the graves of fallen soldiers

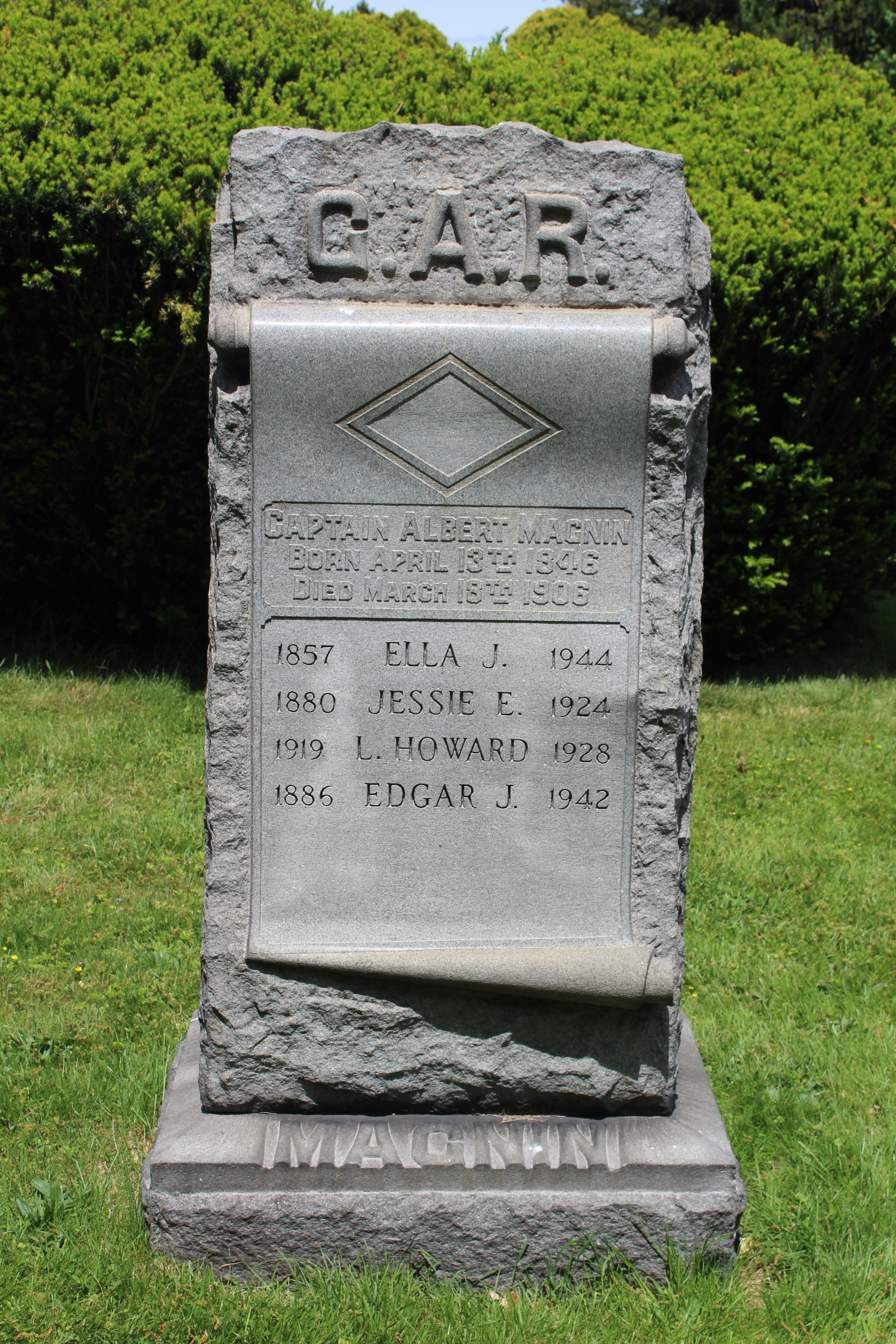
Albert Magnin Gravestone

- Lloyd Alexander (1924–2007) – Author of children's fantasy fiction books. Won the Newbery Medal for "The High King" in 1969.
- Jack Clements (1864–1941) – Major League Baseball Player. Played as a catcher for 17 seasons (1884 to 1900).
- Robert J. Clendening (1914–1982) – Pennsylvania State Representative 1949–52.
- William Adolphus Crouse (1866–1941) – Spanish–American War Medal of Honor recipient.
- Wes Curry (1860–1933) – Major League baseball umpire and player from 1884 to 1898.
- Benjamin F. James (1885–1961) – Republican member of the U.S. and Pennsylvania Houses of Representatives
- Alan MacDiarmid (1927–2007) – Recipient of the Nobel Prize for Chemistry in 2000.
- John F. Mackie (1835–1910) – United States Marine and Civil War recipient of the Medal of Honor.
- Sherry Magee (1884–1929) – Left fielder in Major League Baseball.
- Albert Magnin, Pennsylvania State House representative for Delaware County, 1889–92.
- Ruth Malcomson (1906–1988) – Miss America 1924.
- William H. Milliken, Jr. (1897–1969) – Republican member of the U.S. House of Representatives from Pennsylvania.
- Harry O'Neill (1917–1945) – American baseball player who appeared in one 1939 game for the Philadelphia Athletics, but was one of only two major league baseball players killed in action during World War II.
- Sarkis Torossian (1891–1954) – Decorated Ottoman, French, and British commander of Armenian descent.
- Morrie Rath (1886–1945) – American Major League Baseball player.
- Theodore F. Smith (1852–1925) – Indian Wars Medal of Honor recipient.
- U. E. Baughman (1905–1978) – Chief of the United States Secret Service under Presidents Truman, Eisenhower, and Kennedy.
- David M. Buchanan (1862–1936) Peacetime Navy Medal of Honor recipient.
- John H. White (Medal of Honor), American Civil War recipient of the Medal of Honor.
