= Sarkis Torossian =

Ottoman Armenian captain

- Torossian as commander of Arab forces in Damascus during World War I
- Born: 1891; Everek (present-day: Develi), Ottoman Empire
- Died: October 17, 1954 (aged 63); Bronx, New York, US
- Resting place: Arlington Cemetery, Drexel Hill, Pennsylvania
- Military career
- Allegiance: Ottoman Empire
- Branch: Ottoman Army
- Service years: 1914–1918
- Rank: Captain

Sarkis Torossian (Turkish: Sarkis Torosyan, also spelled Torosian, 1891 – August 17, 1954) was a decorated Ottoman Armenian captain who fought in the Gallipoli campaign and, according to his memoirs, was the first person to sink a British battleship. After the Armenian genocide, however, when most of his family was massacred, he switched sides and joined the fight against the Ottoman Empire. He later moved to the United States, where he wrote and published his memoirs, From Dardanelles to Palestine: A True Story of Five Battle Fronts of Turkey. The authenticity and accuracy of his memoirs have been debated by historians. In anticipation of the publication of Torossian's memoirs in Turkey by Ayhan Aktar, Torosian's descendants were discovered by local historian Paul Vartan Sookiasian. From there, Taner Akçam interviewed Torossian's granddaughter, who described her grandfather's life in detail.

== Life ==
Sarkis Torossian was born in the Armenian-populated village of Everek (present-day Develi), near Kayseri, in 1891. He attended the local Armenian Parochial School. At an early age, Sarkis Torossian wanted to become a soldier; however, Ottoman Turkish law forbade any non-Muslims to become soldiers, until the Young Turk Revolution in 1908. Torossian continued his education in Adrianople (Edirne), where he befriended an Arab named Muharrem, whose father was a brigadier general in Constantinople (Istanbul). Through the help of Muharrem's father, Torossian was secured a position in the Military College and graduated in 1914 with the rank of second lieutenant of the artillery. During his frequent visits to Muharrem's father, Torossian began to develop a passion for his daughter (Muharrem's sister) Jemileh.

=== Gallipoli campaign ===
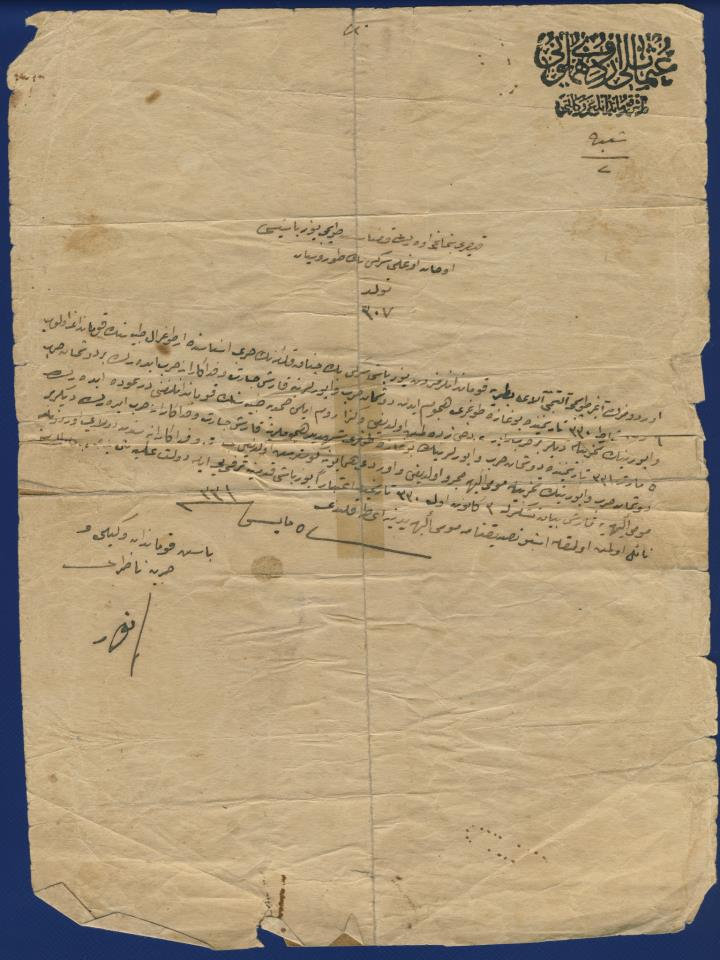
A document signed by Enver Pasha related to the award bestowed by him to Torossian

Upon graduation from the military academy, Torossian was sent to Germany, to the Krupp's factory, where he remained for three months. After the start of World War I, Torossian returned to the Ottoman Empire, where he was appointed to commander of Cape Helles. Early in 1915, when the battle of the Gallipoli campaign was in its early stages, Torossian sunk the first British battleship. In his memoirs, Sarkis Torossian claimed that he sunk a total of three English battlecruisers in the fighting between February 19 and March 18 as well as one submarine in April, which might possibly have been, according to him, HMS E15 of the British Royal Navy. Cevat Pasha praised Torossian's efforts in the battle and pointed out that the forts under his command were the most effective in sinking British ships. When Minister of War Enver Pasha heard of Torossian's deeds during the battle, he congratulated him and introduced him to high-ranking German officers such as Colmar Freiherr von der Goltz and Liman von Sanders. Enver Pasha also awarded Torossian with Osmanlı Devleti harp madalyası (Ottoman State War Medal). In the morning of September 29, 1915, Torossian received word that Muharrem was critically injured during battle and rushed to see him. Just before Muharrem died, he made a confession about his sister Jemileh. According to Torossian's diary the confession is written in his diary as follows:

During the Armenian massacres of 1896 my father was commander of an army brigade stationed near Mush. Even at that time he was deeply aggrieved over Turkish excesses in dealing with their Christian subjects. One day, while passing through an Armenian village, he picked up a little girl, hardly more than two years old, whom he found wandering aimlessly about the deserted streets. No trace of her parents was found, and out of pity, or love, or sorrow my father took her home with him. Eventually she was accepted into the family. My mother, however, objected to a cross tattooed on her upper left arm and applied an acid solution to destroy the Christian emblem; it left a queer shaped scar.

After hearing the confession, Muharrem had made it clear that he would like Torossian to marry his sister. Sarkis Torossian became engaged with Jemileh soon thereafter.

=== Armenian genocide ===
During the initial stages of the Armenian genocide when Armenians were forced to be deported, Sarkis Torossian received assurances from Enver Pasha that his family would not be deported. However, the governor of the Kayseri province, Salih Zeki Bey, ignored Enver Pasha's orders and continued with the deportation of Torossian's family. Torossian's father, Ohannes, and mother, Vartuhi, were murdered, and only his sister Bayzar survived. To save his sister, Torossian went to Macedonia, then Romania, and finally to the Arabian deserts, where he successfully found his sister in the Tel Halaf concentration camp. Soon thereafter, however, both his sister Bayzar and Jemileh died from diseases.

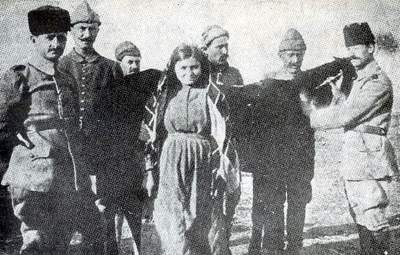
Sarkis Torossian (on the left) encounters his sister Bayzar in the Arabian desert near Tel-Halaf

Jemileh happened to die in his arms and is quoted in the memoirs as saying, "I raised Jemileh in my arms, the pain and terror in her eyes melted until they were bright as stars again, stars in an oriental night...and so she died, as a dream passing". Upon hearing the stories of his sister and having lost his father, mother, sister, and fiancée, Torossian vowed for "revenge" against the Turkish government.

=== Arab campaign ===
In September 1918, during the Battle of Nablus, Sarkis Torossian defected to the British and fought along with Arab rebels against the Ottoman Army. In his memoirs, Torossian writes, "I wanted to break the waist of the Turkish Army". Sarkis Torossian soon led a platoon of Arab soldiers in Palestine and was in charge of 6,000 Arab horsemen in Damascus. For his bravery and leadership in Palestine, the British bestowed him with medals.

=== French Armenian Legion ===
The French Armenian Legion was a foreign legion unit within French Army. The Armenian legion was established under the goals of the Armenian national liberation movement and was an armed unit besides the Armenian volunteer units and Armenian militia during World War I and later the Franco-Turkish War which fought against the Ottoman Empire. Sarkis Torossian used the opportunity of the French Armenian Legions to fight against the Turkish army. The Turkish guerrillas under the leadership of Mustafa Kemal forces pushed back much of the French and Armenian forces in Cilicia and gain control of the region. Torossian suspected, as he noted in his diary, that the French forces gave weapons and ammunition to the Kemalists to allow the French army safe passage out of Cilicia. Having felt betrayed, Torossian emigrated to the United States, where he met his relatives. The French, however, decorated Torossian with medals as well.

=== Later life in America ===
Sarkis Torossian settled in Philadelphia. In 1927, he published his memoirs in Boston called From Dardanelles to Palestine: A True Story of Five Battle Fronts of Turkey, which describes his life and achievements in detail. His memoir has been used by historians to further analyze and research about World War I and the Armenian genocide. Sarkis Torossian died on October 17, 1954, in the Bronx, New York, at the age of 63 and is buried at Arlington Cemetery in Drexel Hill, Pennsylvania.

== Legacy ==
According to author Ayhan Aktar, who edited and published Torossian's memoirs into Turkish, the Turkish official history erased Torossian's name from records and ignored his successes in the Gallipoli campaign owing to his Armenian origin.

== See also ==
- Seferyan Efendi, Ottoman Armenian physician
