= Robert J. Clendening =

American politician

Member of the Pennsylvania House of Representatives from the Delaware County district
- In office 1949–1952
- Preceded by: Walter Francis Layer

Personal details
- Born: April 24, 1914 Washington, D.C., U.S.
- Died: July 28, 1982 (aged 68)
- Resting place: Arlington Cemetery, Upper Darby, Pennsylvania, U.S.
- Party: Republican
- Occupation: Insurance broker

Robert J. Clendening (April 24, 1914 – July 28, 1982) was an American politician from Pennsylvania who served as a Republican member of the Pennsylvania House of Representatives for Delaware County from 1949 to 1952.

== Early life ==
Clendening was born in Washington, D.C., and attended public schools in Upper Darby Township, Pennsylvania. He graduated from the University of Pennsylvania with a B.S. in 1937. He served in the United States Army 80th Infantry Division during World War II and was a Bronze Star Medal recipient.

== Career ==
Clendening was elected to the Pennsylvania House of Representatives for Delaware County and served from 1949 to 1952.

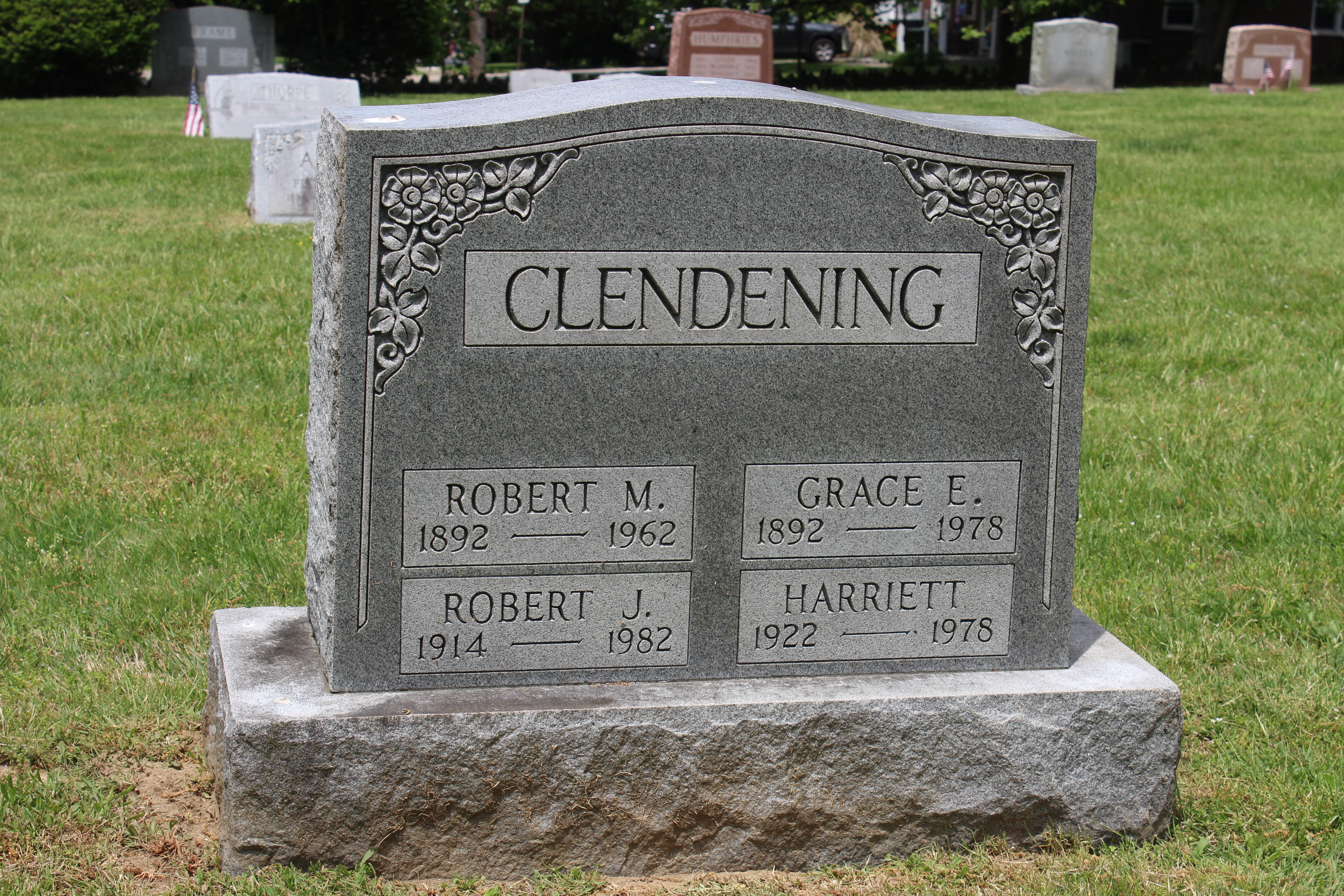
Robert Clendening gravestone in Arlington Cemetery, Upper Darby Township, Pennsylvania

He is interred at the Arlington Cemetery in the Drexel Hill section of Upper Darby.
