= James Wolfenden =

American politician

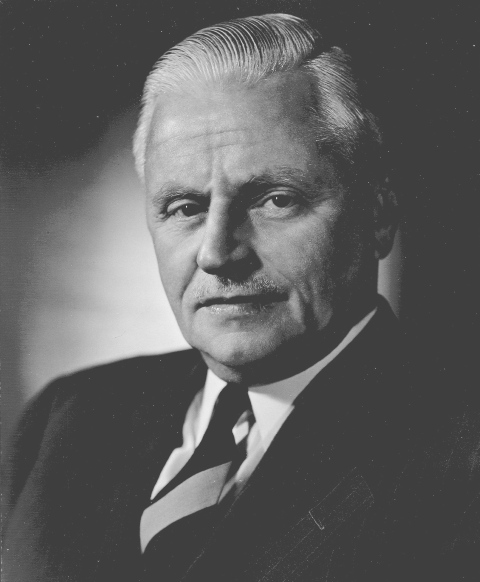
James Wolfenden

James Paine Wolfenden (July 25, 1889 – April 8, 1949) was a Republican member of the U.S. House of Representatives from Pennsylvania.

He was born in Cardington, Pennsylvania. He attended Friends' Central School and Penn Charter Academy in Philadelphia, Pennsylvania. He was engaged in the manufacture of cotton and woolen goods in Cardington, Pennsylvania.

He was elected to the 70th United States Congress as a Republican to fill the vacancy caused by the death of Thomas S. Butler. He was reelected to the 71st United States Congress in 1928 and the eight succeeding Congresses. He did not run in 1946. He died in Philadelphia.

== Biography ==
On May 26, 1928, Congressman Thomas S. Butler of West Chester, Pennsylvania, died at age of 73, after having represented the Delaware/Chester County 8th congressional district for an unprecedented thirty-one years. He was eulogized by various Delaware County leaders, who referred to him kindly as "Uncle Tom" and with whom he had developed a good rapport. Now, however, it was the more populous Delaware County's turn for the two-county congressional seat. By the 1920 census, Delaware County had led Chester County in population by about 173,000 to 115,000, but a gentlemen's agreement between the Republican leaders of each county had allowed the popular Butler to continue his service.

== Vacancy ==
At a meeting on July 31, attended by forty-two Republican conferees from Delaware County and twenty-two from Chester County, thirty-nine-year-old James Wolfenden of Upper Darby was nominated to fill the unexpired term without opposition. Born on July 25, 1889, in Cardington, Delaware County, Wolfenden was an Upper Darby Township Commissioner for nine years and had run his father's cotton and woolen goods manufacturing firm, Wolfenden-Shore, for seven years. He also was a vice president of the Citizen's Bank of Lansdowne and vice president of the Delaware County Hospital, besides being the Republican leader of Upper Darby and later would be named by John J. McClure to the then-young Delaware County Board of Republican Supervisors (War Board). McClure, himself a candidate for the state senate district, which encompassed all of Delaware County, offered a resolution recognizing Butler's passing as the "loss of a great statesman and national leader." The Chester Times heavily praised the choice of Wolfenden, stating that he "will make a good representative" with his "business training" and that he was "progressive", a "leader" and a "booster".

Much excitement was generated in Delaware County and around the nation in the contest for the presidency between Republican Herbert Hoover, President Coolidge's secretary of commerce, and New York Governor Al Smith, a Democrat. Since Smith was a Catholic and, in that era, religious prejudices were then very pronounced, there was a lively debate nationwide.

When the dust had settled election day, Hoover carried staunchly Republican Delaware County by about 83,000 to 29,000. Likewise, Wolfenden defeated his Democratic opponent, Henry Davis, by a 116,266 to 34,607. McClure was also elected to the state senate. The Republicans, having been the dominant party nationally since the turn of the 20th century, had a commanding 267 U.S. House seats to the Democrats 163, with a similar lead in the Senate, 56 to 39. Having also won the special election to fill the remainder of Butler's term, several weeks earlier, against token opposition, Wolfenden was able to take his seat in the House of Representatives on November 6, 1928. He would be the tenth person since 1852 to represent the district in Washington.

== 1st term ==
During his tenure in Congress, he served on the following committees: Merchant Marine and Fisheries, Accounts, Interstate and Foreign Commerce and the Joint Committee on Printing. Some of his activities during his first two terms included serving on a funeral committee for fellow Pennsylvania representative W.W. Griest and introducing bills to increase the pensions of Civil War and Spanish–American War veterans, build an addition to the Veterans Bureau Hospital in Coatesville, remodel a public building in Phoenixville, and survey the Darby River, as Darby Creek was called then. He also had received and noted in the Congressional Record petitions from the West Chester Farmers' Club, Dilworthtown Woman's Christian Temperance Union, and New Century Club of West Chester: all opposing any change in Prohibition.

Congressman Wolfenden generally kept a low profile, in line with McClure's wishes that War Board members keep out of the public spotlight. Less than a year after he took office, the stock market crash occurred in October 1929 and the protracted misery of the Great Depression began for the American people.

One notable vote was his in favor of the infamous Smoot-Hawley tariff of 1930, which helped erect a protectionist trade barrier for the United States and was retaliated against by our trading partners, who raised their own tariffs. It is thought by many economists that this tariff helped to worsen the Depression by hurting exports. In 1930, he also cast a pro-labor vote, voting against the Anti-Injunction Act.

As the Great Depression was gaining momentum and Republicans nationally fell out of favor with the public, Wolfenden, bucking the trend, was easily reelected in 1930, beating his Democratic opponent, Harry Wescott by 64,000 votes, 84,521 to 20,443. Widespread discontent, brought on by untold economic suffering and misery, caused the Democrats to make a net gain of 53 House and eight Senate seats. The Republicans clung to a one-vote lead in the Senate, 48 to 47, and two votes in the House, 218 to 216, although the deaths of several GOP members gave the Democrats a majority by the time Congress reorganized several months later.

== 2nd term ==
After the census of 1930, Pennsylvania's share of congressional seats was reduced from 36 to 34. Evidently, there was very little controversy in the state legislature regarding reapportionment, with the bill being introduced on April 22, 1931, then passed by the House and Senate and signed by the Governor by June 27. Due to its growth in population, Delaware County was separated from Chester County, which shifted into the Tenth congressional district with Lancaster County. Delaware County in its entirety became Pennsylvania's Seventh Congressional District and would remain so for 36 years.

By dividing Pennsylvania's population by the number of House seats it was entitled to, the ideal district size in 1930 was 283,275. Dividing Philadelphia's population by its seven congressional seats, gave each district an average of 278,709, giving it a slight overrepresentation. Delaware County's population of 278,662 made it slightly over-represented, also. In other words, a vote cast in the neighboring Tenth District, with a population of 326,511, carried less weight that a vote cast in Philadelphia for Congress.

The reason for this was political: county lines were rarely, if ever, crossed when the legislature drew up congressional districts. It would not be until the "one man, one vote" ruling of the Supreme Court some 30 years later that this inequality would be rectified.

== 3rd term ==
By 1932, as Hoover makes effort to ease the widespread economic crisis. It could not arrest the continuing downturn, it was clear that voters were turning to the Democratic nominee, Franklin Delano Roosevelt. On November 3, there was a massive pre-election GOP rally in Media, attended by 1,500 of the party faithful, which Senator McClure described as "an inspiration".

Governor Arthur James, himself who is not up for election, defended the Hoover record, comparing the latter to Abraham Lincoln, in whom "people had faith and reelected" against great odds during the Civil War. Congressman Wolfenden, who was up for election, however, was only listed as a "guest" at the rally and did not speak, according to the ChesterTimes.

President Hoover carried Delaware County by 75,291 to FDR's 32,413, including the City of Chester by over two to one. In fact, the GOP machine that dominated Pennsylvania for many years was still able to deliver the state for the unpopular Hoover, 1,453,540 to 1,295,948, making it one of the few major industrial states to swing his way.

Wolfenden won by an even larger majority than Hoover, 70,177 to 32,139, in beating Democrat Matthew Randall. The lopsided county registration figures of 134,038 Republicans to only 8,152 Democrats certainly made the task of winning quite difficult for any Democrat.

But, when Wolfenden returned to Washington to serve his third term, he would find many fewer of his Republican colleagues sitting with him. The GOP's ranks in Congress were decimated, the venerable old party having lost no fewer than 101 House seats and twelve Senate seats, in the FDR landslide. That left the House lineup in favor of the Democrats, 313 to 117, with five independents, and 59 to 36 in the Senate.

In 1933, President Roosevelt, in order to try to relieve the widespread misery due to a now unthinkable unemployment rate of 25% that he inherited from the previous Republican administration, began submitting his New Deal legislation to Congress, which had a top-heavy Democratic majority. From 1933 to 1938, Wolfenden voted against most New Deal proposals, with the exception of several major pieces of legislation, such as the constitutional amendment to repeal Prohibition and allow the purchase of liquor (1933), the Relief Act to allocate money to relieve suffering (1933); the Gold Reserve Act, which devalued the dollar taking the U.S. off the gold standard (1934); the Social Security Act (1935); the Fair Labor Standards Act, which set a forty-hour work week along with a minimum wage (1938).

Some of the bills he voted against were: the Agriculture Adjustment Act to raise farm prices and distribute surplus food to the needy (1933); the Tennessee Valley Authority to federally fund power development in an area especially hit hard by the Depression (1933), the NIRA to allow employees to collectively bargain without interference, along with banning child labor (1933); the Securities Act to reform the stock market (1934); the Reciprocal Tariff Act (1934), the Tax Bill to raise revenue, mostly from the wealthy (1934). Other bills he opposed were: the Relief Act (1936), the Holding Company Act (1936), the Guffey-Snyder Coal Act to help raise the price of Pennsylvania's coal (1936); the Soil Conservation and Relief Act to reforest land (1938) and federal Crop Insurance (1938).

He also voted for isolationist neutrality legislation and opposed earlier efforts to build up defenses, which also reflected the view of the majority of his party and a large segment of the public.

During this period, Wolfenden served on the Migratory Bird Conservation Commission and also introduced HR164, which was aimed towards "discouraging, preventing, punishing the crime of lynching", one of the most vile manifestations of racial hatred still occurring in the Deep South. With conservative Southern Democrats generally controlling the major committees, there was little chance of civil rights legislation being passed.

== 4th term ==
In October 1934, the Chester Times rallied behind Congressmen Wolfenden's reelection bid, running a column showing each of his major votes during his third term. They touted the fact that he had voted against 49 New Deal bills and in favor of only 14. Further, it was stated that "several powerful organizations have thrown their support in the coming election" to Wolfenden, such as the Pennsylvania Veterans of Foreign Wars, the Allied Veterans' Association of the United States and four transportation worker brotherhoods. Both groups based their support on his "good record" in Congress. On October 30, Congressman Wolfenden spoke briefly at the annual GOP rally and made some bland remarks, in keeping with his generally low-profile style.

When the votes were counted nationwide in the first referendum on President Roosevelt and his New Deal, the Democrats, instead of the customary mid-term loss of congressional seats, had gained nine House seats and ten Senate seats. Their majorities now stood at 322 to 103 in the House and 69 to 25 in the Senate.

For the first time since 1890, a Democratic governor, George H. Earle, was elected in Pennsylvania, but Wolfenden won a fourth term, capturing 60,139 votes to 43,426 for John E. McDonough, his Democratic opponent. The Congressman's victory margin dropped from 65.8% of the vote in 1932 to 57.2% in 1934, a harbinger of what was to come.

== 5th term ==
Finally, following another two years of fighting tooth-and-nail against most New Deal legislation, the Republican Party had what it thought was a chance to recapture the presidency with the nomination of Governor Alf Landon of Kansas. Based on progress towards easing the wretched conditions of the citizens, President Roosevelt was enthusiastically renominated by his party and an energetic election ensued. Politicians in Delaware County were also caught up in the excitement at a pre-election rally, with War Board chairman and state Senator McClure stating: "I doubt his sincerity" in describing President Roosevelt's efforts to improve the economy. Congressman Wolfenden, in a more expressive mode, said: "What we need to save America is for the GOP to elect Landon and John McClure." In what appears to be a tribute towards working-class women, he further elaborated: "I am for the Republican ticket from Landon down to the scrub woman, if there was a scrub woman on it."

Although Roosevelt did not carry the county, he made a showing of 65,117 votes to Landon's 74,899, in the official count. The Democrats did carry the City of Chester, 11,600 to 10,500, in a rebuke to the McClure Machine.

Roosevelt carried the blue collar/working class towns of Aston, Chester Twp., Lower and Upper Chichester, Clifton Heights, Collingdale, Colwyn, Darby Boro, Darby Township., Eddystone, Marcus Hook, Parkside, Ridley Twp., Trainer and Tinicum, while Landon drew his strength from the more rural or upper middle class areas of the Marple, Newtown, Radnor, Springfield and Upper Darby. Wolfenden was reelected by a close margin, officially tallying 73,335 (52.6%) to Howard Kirk's 66,119 (47.4%). Wolfenden's popularity evidently was ebbing, as his opponent ran about 1,000 votes ahead of the President, and the congressman some 1,500 votes behind Governor Landon. By 1936, with the general popularity of the New Deal, Democratic registration in the county had surged to a high of 37,000 and the GOP outnumbered them by only 3.4 to one. However, this would only be temporary, and the Democrats would not have as many registered voters again until another twenty years later.

Nationally, the FDR juggernaut swept Landon aside with 60.7% of the vote and the Democrats took an additional eleven House seats from the GOP and now held a 333 to 89 majority, with thirteen third party members. They commanded the Senate by over four to one, 75 to 17, with four elected from other parties.

This would be the most seats the Democratic majority ever won, marking the high-water mark of their national power. In spite of concerted attacks from the Republicans, the New Deal and the hope that it provided had been decisively and overwhelmingly ratified by the poor and working class, elderly, black, and middle class across the nation.

== 6th term ==
In 1938, as the New Deal drew to a close, the Republicans made a comeback from near-oblivion, gaining eighty seats in the House and six in the Senate. The Republicans recaptured the governorship of Pennsylvania and locally, Wolfenden gained a sixth term with 68% of the vote over C. Ferno Hoffman, his Democratic challenger. Continuing the previous trend, however, Wolfenden fell 1,800 votes below the average vote for the Republican candidates for governor and U.S. senator, while Hoffman was 1,100 votes higher than his running mates.

Attention was now shifting toward ominous developments overseas, with both Nazi Germany and the Empire of Japan committing acts of aggression against their neighbors. As the international crisis worsened, with a full-scale war in Europe in September 1939, President Roosevelt asked Congress to strengthen the military in order to deter aggression.

Like most of his Republican colleagues, Wolfenden voted the isolationist line, against the Naval Expansion Act of 1938, the Lend-Lease Act, and the extension of the Selective Service in 1941. Even though the public was divided on most of the defense measures and many were hoping that the U.S. could miraculously avoid war, if these and other military defensive measures had not been adopted, the results could have been catastrophic.

== 7th term ==
What occurred at the 1940 GOP presidential convention was unusual in its time and would be unlikely under modern practices. In the Pennsylvania Republican primary of April 23, New York City District Attorney Thomas E. Dewey, a young (only 38 years old), attractive major contender for the nomination, who gained a national reputation as a racket-buster, had won with over 66% of the vote.

Dewey's only competition in Pennsylvania was, believe it or not, President Roosevelt, who scored a large 10.5% as a write-in candidate and Pennsylvania Governor Arthur H. James, a "favorite son" candidate, with 10.3% of the vote.

In July, Philadelphia played host to the GOP National Convention, which was held at the Convention Center. On the first ballot, no candidate had received the 501 votes needed to be nominated. The tally was Dewey, 360 votes; conservative Ohio Senator Robert Taft, 189; Indiana businessman Wendell L. Willkie, a political "dark horse", 105; Governor James, 74; conservative Michigan Senator Arthur H. Vandenberg, 76; and former president Herbert Hoover, 17.

With the exception of Willkie, all of the candidates were isolationists and had various degrees of political experience. By the fourth ballot, Willkie had catapulted to first place, mostly at Dewey's expense, and by the fifth ballot, Willkie had captured over 400 delegate votes, while Dewey dropped to only 57. By the sixth ballot, Governor James swung Pennsylvania's 72 votes to Willkie, putting him over the top, with 659. It was reported that at 1:50 a.m. the crowd of more than 16,000 marched out of Convention Hall, their job done, and shouted Willkie's name to the night.

The Republicans' shouting would be to no avail, as the Democrats, due to the deepening international crisis, renominated Roosevelt for an unprecedented third term. FDR, it appeared, was genuinely undecided about another term until France fell to the Nazis in May 1940. Voters, in keeping with tradition and not wishing to change national leadership in the midst of a crisis, reelected Roosevelt to an unprecedented third term, with a decisive 54% majority.

This time, he increased his margin in Chester, winning by 11,900 to 9,600. Congressman Wolfenden won another term, with 69,649 to 46,960 for his Democratic opponent, E. Adele Scott Saul. It would not be again until 1994, that a female would run in the general election under the banner of either major party for this office in this congressional district.

In the congressional redistricting following the 1940 census, the boundaries of the Seventh District were unchanged, although Pennsylvania's representation in the House was lowered by one seat to thirty-three and Philadelphia, likewise, lost one seat, retaining six. The ideal population for a congressional district in Pennsylvania in 1940 was 300,005. With Delaware County's congressional district representing 310,756 persons and each of Philadelphia's districts averaging 321,889, both the county and city were slightly short-changed in representation.

In December 1941, both houses of Congress voted without dissension, except for Republican Congresswoman Jeannette Rankin of Montana, to declare war on Germany and Japan. Wolfenden voted on December 8 to declare war on Japan, but missed the vote on December 11 to declare war on Germany and Italy.

== 8th term ==
In 1942, the Republicans, in a comeback, gained 10 Senate seats and 47 house seats, nearly jeopardizing Democratic control in the house. Wolfenden was reelected, but not after a stiff challenge from Vernon O'Rourke, a Swarthmore College professor, who was aided by liberals and independents.

This coalition effort foreshadowed the campaign of fellow Democrat Bob Edgar, 32 years later. O'Rourke attacked the incumbent's isolationist voting record and waged an intensive door-to-door campaign. Nevertheless, the Congressman won by 48,210 to 34,164, with 58% of the vote in a low turn-out wartime election. But, the candidate for governor, Edward Martin, received 8,000 more votes than Wolfenden in the county.

In the 1944 election, FDR ran for a fourth term against Dewey, who was governor of New York. The campaign both nationally and locally was hotly contested and brutal at times, with various unsavory charges flying back and forth between the two parties. Wolfenden was also running for another term, his ninth, against the same opponent as last time. The election had a different twist in that O'Rouke had resigned his professorship at Swarthmore and was serving as a lieutenant, junior grade, aboard a destroyer escort. Since he was at sea and navy regulations forbade active political campaigning, O'Rourke campaigned through stand-ins.

At a Democratic rally at the Odd Fellows Temple in Chester, Owen Hunt, former state insurance commissioner, stood in for O'Rourke. In his remarks, Hunt referred to Wolfenden as "treacherous", having voted against twenty-two important defense bills in the past ten years. Further, he stated that the congressman never cast a vote without "ulterior motives" and served "special interests and sinister influences", such as big business and international cartels.

In charges that smacked of the McCarthyism that would develop in a few years, Hunt seemed to be attempting to impugn Wolfenden's loyalty by stating that the Japanese, prior to the war, had not possessed the resources to build a military machine, until they were supplied by the so-called "sinister influences". He also said that on December 8, the day war was declared, Wolfenden was "out shooting ducks along the Chesapeake".

The Auditor General of Pennsylvania, Democrat Clair Ross, likened the GOP of 1944 to the party of 1920, saying that they were both "haters" and under the "control of reactionaries and isolationists". Further, he elaborated that the Republicans were the party of "Hoover, Landon and Heart; McCormick, Taft and Nye; Martin, Barton and Fish", referring to isolationist members of Congress, as well as former candidates.

Next on the attack was Congressman Francis J. Myers, candidate for U.S. Senate, who painted Dewey as anti-labor and decried the latter's use of "innuendoes" towards certain critics by referring to them as "Russian" or "foreign born". He also criticized efforts by the county government to purge recent voters from the registration rolls, by calling them in for questioning about their residency.

On September 22, Roosevelt, in replying to Republican charges about advance knowledge within the administration regarding the attack on Pearl Harbor, said anyone with such knowledge should notify the military boards who were conducting investigations.

As the allies penetrated deeper into German soil, three months after the landing at Normandy, the headlines were dominated by this news, as well as the growing casualty lists. With unemployment virtually erased in the United States, the U.S. Employment Service reported that there were 7,594 immediate job openings in Delaware County, with 3,415 of those needing unskilled workers.

In October, Delaware County's population was estimated at 335,000, based on the number of rationing books sent by the local offices. According to statistics provided by the Chester Rationing Board, with Chester as a huge wartime manufacturing and commercial center, two-thirds of the county populace lived in Chester and the surrounding towns of Chester Twp., Upland and Parkside. Some of the other Rationing Boards in the county were located in Marcus Hook, Glenolden, Ridley Park, Media and Clifton Heights.

Also in October, Democratic U.S. Senator Joseph Guffey offered a $10,000 reward for any legitimate knowledge of voter fraud in Delaware County, denouncing the alleged "debauchery of the ballot", as practiced by Joseph N. Pew, Jr. and McClure.

Charges of "who-really-got-us-into-this-war" continued to fly, as Republican Congressman Hugh Scott, later to become senator, accused President Roosevelt of "criminal negligence" regarding the positioning of the Pacific fleet immediately prior to Pearl Harbor. Republican loyalists in Chester and Delaware counties, as well as across the Commonwealth, called for a "Day for Dewey", during which volunteers would be asked to donate eight hours to enlist their friends and neighbors to support the cause.

At a rally held at the Chester Elks' Hall, Wolfenden, reacting to the strong labor support for his opponent, hammered away at the "radical, criminal" leadership of the political action committee for the CIO labor union. He called on the unions to purge their ranks of these elements and shot off a series of rhetorical questions to Leon Weiner, editor of the newspaper for Local 107 of the Electrical Workers, questioning the latter's alleged ties to Communist or leftist groups. Wolfenden then paraded his letters of endorsement from the national American Federation of Labor and four railroad brotherhoods.

On October 27, over 3,000 residents gathered, hoping to catch a glimpse of President Roosevelt as his train passed through Delaware County. As the train slowed at the Baltimore and Ohio station at 12th Street and Providence Avenue in Chester, Roosevelt waved from the window and flashed his famous smile, causing the crowd to surge forward in excitement. One woman stated: "I almost saw him." Although knowledge of his deteriorating health was kept from the public, FDR regained some of his old form and returned the fire of Dewey, accusing the Republicans of placing "party over patriotism".

On election eve, there were 141,006 Republicans registered in the county, as opposed to only 27,184 Democrats. In Chester, the GOP also led, 20,588 to 4,687. Although organized labor, which never had it so good with the wartime boom, was pushing hard for Roosevelt and O'Rourke, county GOP leaders predicted that there would be very little ticket-splitting, due to difficulties with the voting machines.

As it had done before, the Chester Times opposed Roosevelt's reelection, citing, in a front-page editorial, his "inefficiency" regarding domestic affairs, an "improvised" foreign policy, the possible "dictatorship" of another term, and his choice of Missouri Senator Harry S. Truman, as a "person of no outstanding ability".

== 9th term ==
In spite of all the opposition, FDR won his fourth, and last term, beating Dewey, with 25.6 million votes to 22 million. Governor Dewey, however, officially led Roosevelt in the county, 78,533 to 64,021.

When the voting machines were tallied, Wolfenden had 67,081 to O'Rourke's 64,484. However, some 10,000 absentee ballots, cast mostly by those in the military, remained to be opened on November 22. Not to take chances, the Democrats received court permission to place a twenty-four-hour watch on the vault where the ballots were locked away.

O'Rourke could only overcome Wolfenden's narrow lead of 2,597 votes by taking 64% of the soldiers' ballots, a difficult, but not impossible task. As the ballots were counted over the next several weeks, it was clear that Wolfenden would be reelected, with the final totals of 72,289 (51.5%) to 68,161 (48.5%).

Contrary to the Republicans' predictions, there was some ticket-splitting, since O'Rourke had polled some 4,100 votes more votes than the top of the Democratic ticket. According to party sources, due to his close call in the election, Wolfenden promised McClure that he would not run again in 1946.

In December, it was announced that Wolfenden would tour the Pacific war fronts.

In 1945, Delaware County's congressman voted with 299 other members to override the veto of a tax bill that President Roosevelt described as "not a tax bill, but a tax relief bill providing tax relief not for the needy, but for the greedy". Wolfenden also voted that year for Congress' first pay raise since 1925. Other notable bills that he voted or took positions on in his last term were the Manpower Draft Bill (N); giving permanent status to the House Un-American Activities Committee, which investigated Communists and other "undesirables", (Y); the Trade Agreements Act (N); outlawing the Poll Tax, which was used to prevent blacks in the South from voting, for federal elections (Y); the Full Employment Act (Paired Against); Federal Aid to airports (N); the School Lunches Act (Y).

On April 12, 1945, President Roosevelt died of a massive cerebral hemorrhage and Vice President Harry Truman was sworn in, as the war in Europe was moving towards a close.

== Era ends ==
On February 13, 1946, true to his promise to McClure, Wolfenden announced he would not seek another term in Congress. In a press release, he stated: "It will always be one of my cherished theories that I have voted in accordance with my conscience in an effort to protect the best interests of Delaware County".

On May 23, he was involved in a boating accident while on vacation in Ocean City, New Jersey. The Evening Bulletin reported that Wolfenden was aboard the Ram, 28-foot cabin cruiser, as a guest of assistant county coroner, Charles H. Drewes, when an engine backfire caused seventy gallons of gasoline that had just been loaded to explode. Wolfenden was in the cockpit and sprayed with flaming gasoline, then blown overboard by the force of the explosion.

He was rescued and spent several days recovering from first and second degree burns in a Hamonton nursing home owned by a relative. With his left foot remaining permanently injured, his voting attendance declined, along with his health. As he was having another operation on his foot at Temple University Hospital, he died on April 8, 1949, two years after leaving office.

James Wolfenden had represented Delaware County for eighteen years, the longest tenure of any to hold the office since Tom Butler. His service covered the entire Hoover and Roosevelt presidencies and the first two years of Truman's. He served as both a majority and minority member of the House, attaining the positions of Assistant House Republican Whip and chairman of Pennsylvania's GOP delegation, as well as being the state's ranking member.

His record showed he was basically an isolationist and protectionist, but did show compassion towards the elderly with his favorable Social Security Act vote and towards children with his School Lunch vote. He also took a small, but initial step towards assuring civil rights for all Americans by voting to abolish the poll tax in federal elections. All in all, his service was neither distinguished or inspired, but did attempt to balance the interests of a district that was undergoing a rapid transition from primarily sleepy rural to a growing, bustling bedroom community.

Sources: Delaware County Daily Times, Facts on File, Philadelphia Evening Bulletin, News of Delaware County, Congressional Record

== Sources ==
- United States Congress. "James Wolfenden (id: W000678)". Biographical Directory of the United States Congress.
- The Political Graveyard

U.S. House of Representatives
Preceded by Thomas S. Butler	Member of the U.S. House of Representatives from Pennsylvania's 8th congressional district 1928–1945	Succeeded by Charles L. Gerlach
Preceded by Hugh Scott	Member of the U.S. House of Representatives from Pennsylvania's 7th congressional district 1945–1947	Succeeded by E. Wallace Chadwick
