= William Adolphus Crouse =

American Medal of Honor recipient

- Born: October 22, 1866; Fannettsburg, Pennsylvania, U.S.
- Died: June 27, 1941 (aged 74); Harrisburg, Pennsylvania, U.S.
- Military career
- Allegiance: United States of America
- Branch: United States Navy
- Service years: 1898
- Unit: USS Concord
- Conflicts: Spanish–American War
- Awards: Medal of Honor

William Adolphus Crouse (October 22, 1866, Fannettsburg, Pennsylvania – June 27, 1941) was an American Medal of Honor recipient.

== Biography ==
He served in the US Navy during the Spanish–American War as a watertender aboard the USS Concord. He was awarded the Medal of Honor for his bravery off Cavite, Manila Bay, Philippines, May 21, 1898. He was awarded his Medal on December 14, 1898.

He rose the rank of Chief Commissary Steward before retiring from the Navy.

Crouse died in 1941 and is buried in Arlington Cemetery in Drexel Hill, Pennsylvania.

== Medal of Honor citation ==
Following the blowout of a lower manhole plate joint on boiler B of that vessel, William Crouse hauled the fires in the hot, vapor-filled atmosphere which necessitated the playing of water into the fireroom from a hose.

== See also ==
- List of Medal of Honor recipients
