= Benjamin F. James =

American politician

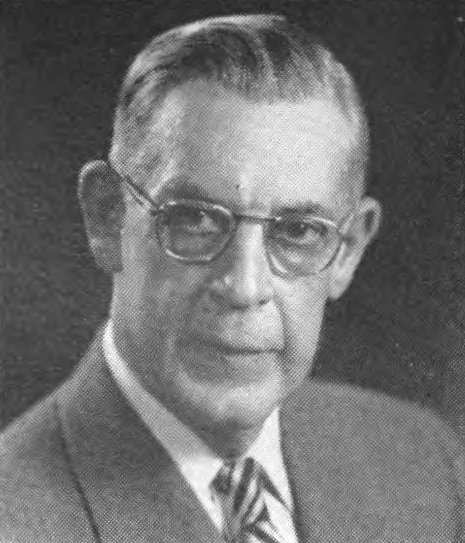

Member of the U.S. House of Representatives from Pennsylvania's 7th district
- In office January 3, 1949 – January 3, 1959
- Preceded by: E. Wallace Chadwick
- Succeeded by: William H. Milliken, Jr.

Member of the Pennsylvania House of Representatives
- In office 1939–1947

Personal details
- Born: August 1, 1885 Philadelphia, Pennsylvania, US
- Died: January 26, 1961 (aged 75) Bryn Mawr, Pennsylvania, US
- Party: Republican

Benjamin Franklin James (August 1, 1885 – January 26, 1961) was an American politician from Pennsylvania who served as a Republican member of the U.S. House of Representatives for Pennsylvania's 7th congressional district from 1949 to 1959. He served as a member of the Pennsylvania House of Representatives for Delaware County from 1939 to 1947.

== Early life ==
James was born in Philadelphia. He extensively studied in graphic arts. In 1910, he moved to Radnor Township in Delaware County, Pennsylvania. During World War I, he enlisted in the United States Army and was assigned to the Central Officers Training School. He was honorably discharged in November 1918 as a second lieutenant in the United States Army Reserves.

== Career ==
James was president and chairman of the board of directors of the Franklin Printing Co. of Philadelphia (founded in 1728 by Benjamin Franklin). He was a member of the Radnor Township Board of Commissioners from 1929 to 1936. He served in the Pennsylvania State House of Representatives for Delaware County from 1939 through 1946. He was elected as a Republican to the Eighty-first and to the four succeeding Congresses. He was not a candidate for renomination in 1958.

James served as president of the Poor Richard Club and also was the first president of the Printing Industries of Philadelphia, an organization for printers. Serving as a Radnor township commissioner from 1929 to 1936, he had been instrumental in reorganizing the township's lighting system and making other improvements. As a state representative from 1939 to 1947, he introduced the James bill, which would have prevented the City of Philadelphia from collecting the wage tax from suburbanites, however the bill was defeated.

=== 1949 to 1953 ===
Upon taking office on January 3, 1949, James was appointed to the District of Columbia and House Administration committees, two relatively low-profile areas.

President Truman, meanwhile, had asked Congress to enact a "Fair Deal" for the American people, calling for an increase in the minimum wage, health insurance and banning discrimination.

During his first term, some issues that James voted on were: the Marshall Plan to aid western Europe (Y); Mundt-Nixon Anti-Communist Bill (Y); allowing refugees into the country (Y); National Housing Act of 1949 (N); Agricultural Act of 1949 (price supports) (Y); Trade Agreements Extension Act (Y); Aid to NATO (N); South Korean aid (N); a weakened Fair Employment Practices Act, with no enforcement powers (Y); Proportional Electoral Vote (N); Internal Security Act of 1950, which was passed over a presidential veto (Y). He also took a position in favor of extending rent controls. Although he generally voted the Republican anti-Communist line, he voted against aiding American European allies in NATO and the fledgling Republic of Korea (South Korea), prior to its invasion by Communist North Korea. In a committee vote on the Anti-Poll Tax bill in 1949, he was the only Republican to vote with six conservative southern Democrats against the measure. In 1951, Congressman James introduced a bill to fix the strength of the Marine Corps and make the commandant a member of the Joint Chiefs of Staff.

=== 1953 to 1958 ===
In 1953, as a member of the majority party, and thirty-seventh in party seniority, James was appointed to the Appropriations Committee. He served on the subcommittees on general government matters, Treasury and Post Office departments, as well as remaining on the District of Columbia committee. He was known as an active member of the committee, according to the News of Delaware County, "developing a reputation for paying close attention to government spending." During his service on the Appropriations Committee, the federal government ran budget surpluses in 1956 and 1957. In 1957, he introduced two bills: to include the Ben Franklin TV series in the Archives of Congress and to begin the development of Independence National Historical Park. Overall, he compiled a moderately conservative record, not too different from his two predecessors. In a comparison of 58 important issues voted on between 1949 and 1958, James agreed with ultra-conservative Noah Mason of Illinois 74% of the time, but split on such key issues, such as civil rights and foreign aid. Starting in 1953, the Congressional Quarterly began compiling more detailed information about the voting records of members of Congress.

In his first term, Congressman James voted 87% of the time with the majority of his party and supported the Eisenhower administration 65% of the time and was in opposition only 15% of the time. (The numbers do not add up due to missed votes on his part.) In 1955–1956, he was 53% pro-Eisenhower in his votes and 28% against, with his attendance falling to 73% of all recorded votes. By the 1957–1958 term, his attendance had fallen to only 52%, as illness began overtaking him.

=== Election of 1948 ===
In the primary of 1948, James was backed by the political machine led by John J. McClure and the Delaware County Board of Republican Supervisors, known as the "War Board", to unseat the independent incumbent E. Wallace Chadwick. James prevailed by some 7,600 votes in the primary election. In the general election, he easily defeated Democrat Arthur Snyder, 91,394 to 56,263, leading with 61.3% .

=== The Korean War elections, 1950 and 1952 ===
With the second war in five years grinding on in Korea and casualties mounting, the Democrats were again on the defensive in 1950. The national scene did not seem to have much impact locally, as James won reelection by a margin similar to his first election, 62.7%, over Hubert P. Earle. With campaign finance reporting being rather lax at the time, James reported 1950 expenses of $237, while his opponent reported spending about $2,700. In contrast, fellow Republican Congressman Paul Dague of the Chester/Lancaster district, reported $1,000 in expenses.

At a rally held in October at Upper Darby Junior High School, James, along with county party chairman Throne, Mrs. Ray Murdock, national committeewoman, and C. William Kraft, Jr., chairman of the Citizens for Eisenhower committee, warmed up the crowd. James said he had "traveled the length and breadth of the county to answer the lies and half-truths promulgated by our opponents." The election was a "crusade rather than a campaign - a crusade against a crowd who usurped the fair name of the Democratic Party and … degraded it."

With the help of a lopsided G.O.P. registration edge of 211,188 to 30,254, James was reelected with a solid 61.7% of the vote, 127,918 to Democrat Murray Zealor's 79,423. He reported expenses of $225 and Zealor reported $27. In the county, the popular Ike received 128,889 to Stevenson's 79,734, also carrying Chester, 12,772 to 11,944.

=== 1954 midterm election ===
On March 1, 1954, four Puerto Rican fanatics, shouting for independence for the island, sprayed the House of Representatives with pistol fire, wounding five members of Congress. James narrowly escaped injury when a bullet struck the wall behind him.

Later that month, he was endorsed for a fourth term by McClure and the War Board and was opposed by independent Harry Hyde of Drexel Hill in the primary. Also endorsed were incumbent state representatives, M. Joseph Connelly of Upper Darby, J. Warren Bullen of Lansdowne, Edwin E. Lippincott of Upper Darby, along with newcomers Joseph W. Isaacs, Folcroft, John H. Foster, Wayne, and Clarence D. Bell of Upland. Re-endorsed for seats on the state committee were Mrs. Mae Kernaghan of Yeadon, a future state legislator, and Albert H. Swing of Radnor, later to be involved in controversy as a county commissioner. According to the News, the county chairman "pointed out that the ticket was arrived at without dissension".

The Democrats, however, did have plenty of dissension, including a fierce primary fight for James' seat between the endorsed candidate, O. Arthur Cappiello, and Swarthmore College professor Gerard W. Mangone. Minority County Commissioner Albert J. Crawford, Jr. charged that Upper Darby Democratic chairman Joseph Helyenek worked with Republicans against a Democratic candidate in 1951. Helyenek countered with charges that Crawford was "playing footsie" with McClure and the G.O.P. machine and also launched bitter attacks on the county party chairman, John Sheehan. When the votes were counted, Cappiello had won, 4,808 to 3,038 and James had been renominated over Hyde, 43,049 to 8,216.

In the fall election, the Democrats turned their fire from themselves to the G.O.P., waging a vigorous campaign. The opposition party charged that the Republican-led government had not corrected "intolerable" traffic bottlenecks at the busy 69th Street commercial district in Upper Darby, delayed constructing a county mental hospital, failed to exempt suburbanites from the Philadelphia wage tax, did nothing to stop a "probable" reduction of unemployment benefits, condoned "blueblood" gambling, took no action regarding "hidden unemployment", as well as refusing to debate the Democratic candidates openly.

The Republicans countered by accusing the Democrats of scheming to annex the suburban counties to Philadelphia (a preelection bugaboo that was repeated in succeeding elections in various forms), plotting to levy a wage tax on county residents and running a "Fifth Amendment sympathizer" for governor. GOP County Chairman Throne told the Women's Club of Morton that state Senator George Leader, Democratic candidate for governor, and his "bosses" were hatching a plot, authored by the "Dilworth-Clark Democratic machine in Philadelphia" to annex the suburbs to the city. "Dilworth and Clark will rule Delaware County and the counties adjacent to Philadelphia from their palatial soft rug upholstered sanctums in dirty Philadelphia City Hall," he further warned. "Annexation … would give the Philadelphia Democratic Machine more money and increase the tax load of the suburban home owner who moved away from Philadelphia to get clean economic government."

Democrat Cappiello returned the fire with some of his own, rejecting G.O.P. claims that a vote for James was a vote for the popular President Eisenhower. James, he said, was "not an Eisenhower supporter except when it suits John McClure." Further, he stated "McClurism, not Eisenhower, is at issue in Delaware County", blasting James for his "opposition to labor legislation, housing, aid to veterans and other progressive measures.

The Democratic congressional hopeful said that James opposed Eisenhower's programs in about one-third of the roll-call votes and cited seven votes "where James was in open rebellion against the Eisenhower program" and five missed votes on major items.

At a rally held in Yeadon, Cappiello lashed out at the federal and state inaction regarding the recession, warning "we are rapidly approaching a situation fully comparable to the Hoover Depression in terms of human misery". Indeed, the unemployment rate had increased from the low of 2.5% in 1953 to an average rate of 5.0% for 1954, as the economy adjusted to the end of the Korean War, but it hardly approached the peak Depression rate of 24.9% in 1933. Cappiello's credibility seemed a bit strained: on one hand, he was blaming the Eisenhower administration for the recession, and on the other, he was criticizing James for not voting with the Eisenhower position more often.

Whether the voters realized this or not is unclear, but, in spite of the vigorous campaign by the Democrats, James won another term easily, carrying 60.9% of the vote this time, with a 36,000 vote plurality. According to the News, "a sign of Mr. James apparent popularity in the county is the fact he ran well ahead of the rest of the Republican ticket". The paper cited the fact he polled about 1,600 votes more than the next highest vote-getter, the candidate for state secretary of internal affairs.

=== 1956 election ===
With the McClure political machine securely in control of Delaware County, local attention was centered on the possibility that former Philadelphia mayor and reformer, Joseph S. Clark, Jr. might pull an upset over incumbent Republican Senator Duff.

In various speeches throughout the fall campaign, Congressman James, as well as state Senator G. Robert Watkins, attacked Clark mercilessly, often citing his membership in the liberal group, Americans for Democratic Action. In one speech in October, both officeholders said that Clark's "membership in the ADA alone is enough to disqualify Joe Clark from sitting in Jim Duff's chair in the U.S. Senate" and that the ADA had provided unspecified "aid and comfort to the cause of international communism". It was clear that even though McCarthyism had been renounced in Congress, the same tactics were alive and well in Delaware County in 1956.

The Democrats quickly returned the fire, with the county chairman, Charles J. Hepburn Jr., stating that James and his colleagues in the county, in attacking Clark's patriotism, were "duplicating cornered rat tactics that led to the defeat of the corrupt and whipped Republican regime in Philadelphia in 1949." This did not deter James, however, who again spoke out against Clark at a campaign stop.

Meanwhile, James's opponent, William A. Welsh, blasted the incumbent and congressional Republicans, stating that their version of tax relief meant a "steelworker family of four would pay $420 taxes on a $5,000 income, while a coupon clipping stockholder pays only $200 on the same income".

Further, he said: "James claims of so-called accomplishments have resulted in the last four years of profits of the corporations increasing 35 per cent, while income for the average family is up only four per cent. It is time that Delaware County had someone in Congress who thinks of prosperity in terms of the people and not just in the interests of big business".

Adding fuel to the senatorial election fires, the County Commissioners, on October 10, with the lone Democrat strenuously objecting, voted two to one to condemn a proposed increase in the Philadelphia wage tax, linking it to spending increases during Clark's previous tenure as mayor. The Democratic commissioner charged election years politics was the real concern of the Republicans.

In stepping up his attacks, Welsh charged James with a "cynical attitude" towards public housing, having "voted to kill public housing outright", causing "those in low incomes (to) have little hope of getting housing." James, who was consistently popular among the voters, did not bother to publicly respond, but saved his remarks for defending the record of Senator Duff against the rising tide of Joe Clark's candidacy.

On October 24, at a speech to four hundred party workers at the Essington Republican Club, James defended the military draft. "Parents do not want ever again to have untrained and unprepared kids sent into battle", with President Eisenhower being "their best insurance against war." Further, he declared that the draft would "insure proper conditioning of our youth in the event of armed conflict." Some eight years later, James' remarks would be tested when hundreds of thousands of "kids" would be drafted to serve in Vietnam.

James defeated Welsh, with about 62% of the vote, 137,764 to 84,764. From the expense reports filed with Congress, the local campaigns spent minimal money, with James reporting no expenses at all, to the Democrat's $804.

=== Final term and failing health ===
On February 15, 1958, James announced he would not be a candidate for a sixth term. His modest statement read: "At the conclusion of the 85th Congress I shall have served as a member of the national house of Representatives for ten years - five consecutive terms. My decision to forgo possible further preferment for public office has been made regretfully, and only after carefully weighing the demands of such service against the inevitable changes, of personal concern, that come with the passing of time".

He had been hospitalized twice in 1957 for an undisclosed illness and in May of that year had had surgery. By June 1958, he had resigned his seat on the Appropriations Committee due to his "worsening physical condition."

Just as Ike had brought stability to the nation in the Cold War era of the 1950s, Ben James seemed to be a pillar of political stability to the residents of rapidly growing Delaware County. Voters showed their unfading confidence in him by giving him election majorities ranging from 60.9% to 62.7%.

James voted in favor of the Civil Rights Act of 1957. He died at age seventy-five on January 26, 1961.

U.S. House of Representatives
Preceded by E. Wallace Chadwick	Member of the U.S. House of Representatives from Pennsylvania's 7th congressional district 1949–1959	Succeeded by William H. Milliken, Jr.
