= Walter Francis Layer =

American politician (1907–1965)

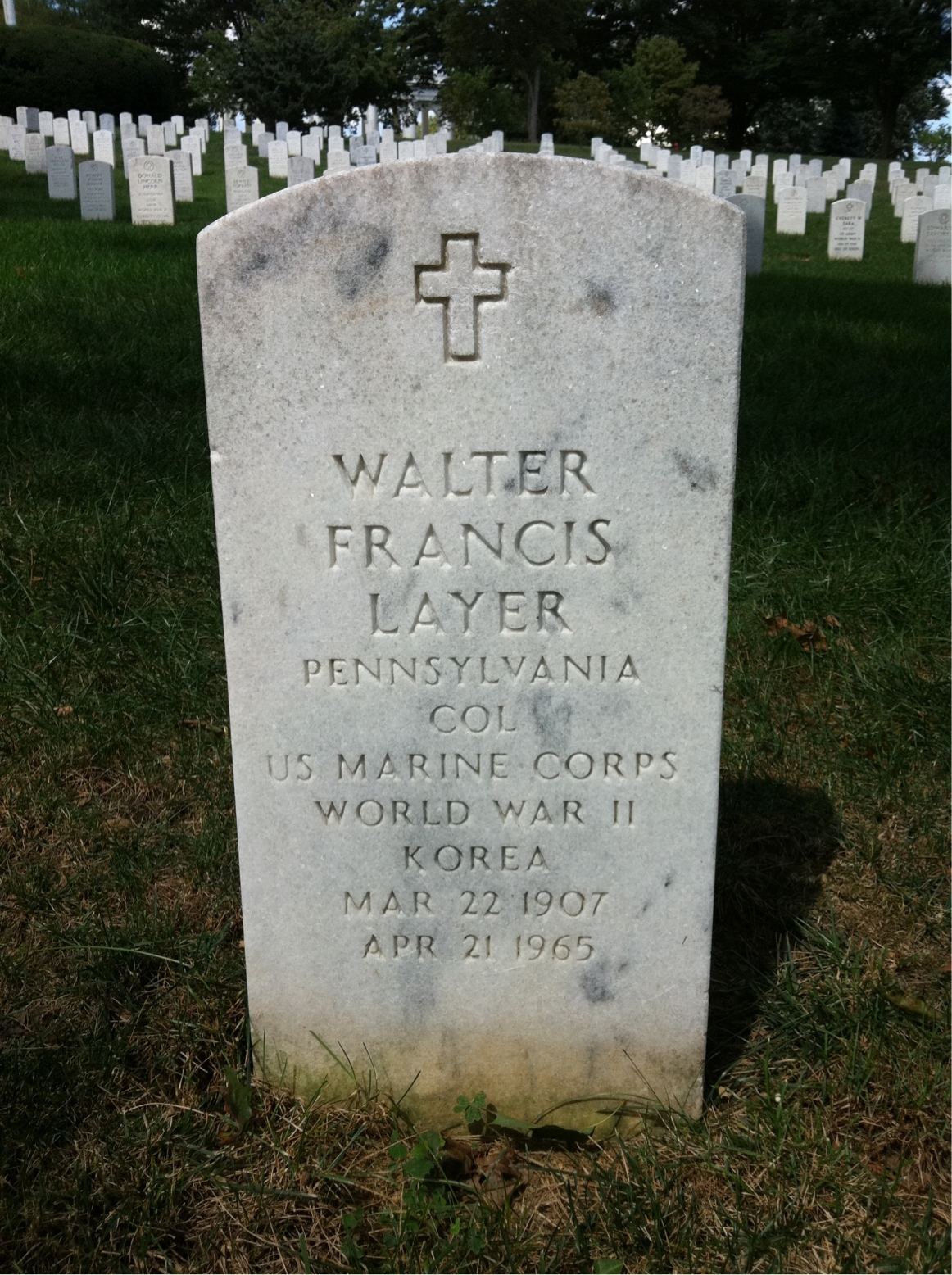

Member of the Pennsylvania House of Representatives from the Delaware County district
- In office 1947–1948
- Succeeded by: Robert J. Clendening

Personal details
- Born: March 22, 1907 Philadelphia, Pennsylvania, U.S.
- Died: April 21, 1965 (aged 58)
- Resting place: Arlington National Cemetery, Arlington, Virginia
- Party: Republican

Walter Francis Layer (March 22, 1907 – April 21, 1965) was an American politician from Pennsylvania who served as a Republican member of the Pennsylvania House of Representatives for Delaware County from 1947 to 1948. He served as lieutenant colonel in the United States Marine Corps during World War II and as colonel during the Korean War. He received the Legion of Merit award and was a member of the Naval Order of the United States.

== Early life ==
Layer was born in Philadelphia, Pennsylvania, and attended public schools in Philadelphia and Chester County. He graduated from the Pennsylvania Military Preparatory School in 1928 and from the Pennsylvania Military College in 1932. Layer worked as a math teacher at Pennsylvania Military College for two years after graduation. He played professional basketball with the Philadelphia Jaspers from 1932 to 1933.

== Military service ==
Layer served in the U.S. Army Reserve as a second lieutenant. He resigned his commission with the U.S. Army Reserve in 1941 in order to accept a commission in the Marine Corps Reserve. He served during World War II as a special naval observer from 1941 to 1942, as an intelligence officer in the United States Marine Corps Staff and Command School from 1943 to 1944 and as a lieutenant colonel in 1945. He led the 3rd Battalion, 8th Marines during the Battle of Tinian. He received the Bronze Star Medal for his service.

Layer was recalled to service during the Korean War. He commanded the 1st Marine Regiment as colonel and served along the Jamestown Line. He received the Legion of Merit award for his service. He served as a senior advisor to the Republic of Korea Marine Corps and received the Military Order of Ulchi with Gold Star for his service.

In 1953, Layer became a member of the regular Marine Corps. He served as provost marshal of the Navy Department and as commanding officer of the Marine Corps Barracks at the Brooklyn Navy Yard.

Layer was a member of the Naval Order of the United States.

== Career ==
After leaving the military, Layer worked as supervising foreman for the Sun Oil Company.

Layer was elected to the Pennsylvania House of Representatives for Delaware County and served from 1947 to 1948. He was a member of the Joint Legislative Commission on Labor Laws. He was not a candidate for reelection in 1949. He also served as councilman for the borough of Ridley Park, Pennsylvania.

Layer is interred at Arlington National Cemetery in Arlington, Virginia.
