= William H. Milliken Jr. =

American politician (1897-1969)

William H. Milliken, Jr.
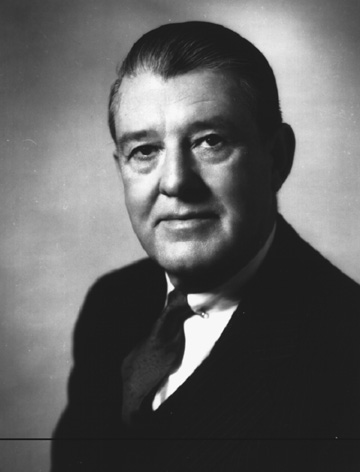

Member of the U.S. House of Representatives from Pennsylvania's 7th district
- In office January 3, 1959 – January 3, 1965
- Preceded by: Benjamin F. James
- Succeeded by: G. Robert Watkins

Member of the Pennsylvania House of Representatives for the Delaware County district
- In office 1943-1946; 1949-1950

Personal details
- Born: August 19, 1897 Philadelphia, Pennsylvania, U.S.
- Died: July 4, 1969 (aged 71) Ridley Park, Pennsylvania, U.S.
- Resting place: Arlington Cemetery, Lansdowne, Pennsylvania, U.S.
- Party: Republican

William H. Milliken Jr. (August 19, 1897 – July 4, 1969) was an American politician from Pennsylvania who served as a Republican member of the U.S. House of Representatives for Pennsylvania's 7th congressional district from 1959 to 1965. He served in the Pennsylvania House of Representatives for Delaware County from 1943 to 1946 and from 1949 to 1950.

During his time in the U.S. House of Representatives, Milliken had a voting record that was mostly a conservative one.

== Early life and education ==
Milliken was born in Philadelphia, Pennsylvania, and moved to Sharon Hill, Pennsylvania, in 1906. He attended Sharon Hill public schools and graduated from Drexel Institute in Philadelphia. After graduation he worked as a construction foreman and a sales executive for the Whitehall Cement Manufacturing Company.

== Career ==
He was elected to the Pennsylvania State House of Representatives for Delaware County in a special election in 1943 to serve the remainder of the 1943 term. He was reelected in 1944 and 1948. He was not a candidate for reelection in 1946 and 1950. He served as clerk of courts of Delaware County, Pennsylvania.

He was appointed burgess of Sharon Hill to fill an unexpired term on September 14, 1948, and was reelected in 1949, 1953 and 1957 and served until 1959.

Milliken was elected as a Republican to the Eighty-sixth, Eighty-seventh and Eighty-eighth Congresses.

=== The 1958 election ===
Milliken was a member of the Delaware County Board of Republican Supervisors, known as the "War Board", run by political boss John J. McClure. When Benjamin F. James announced his retirement from Congress in February 1958, there was speculation as to whom the War Board would endorse for his successor. Milliken was among those being considered for the job.

When the War Board met on March 21, 1958, at McClure's home, it was reported that those in attendance were: Milliken, state senator G. Robert Watkins; county commissioners Arthur C. Throne and J. Warren Bullen; Walter Weaver of Darby Township; Newtown Township supervisor John Gable; state committeeman Albert H. Swing of Radnor; Fred Duke of Clifton Heights; Roy Blackburn of Haverford Township; and John R. Cramp, county Republican chairman. Milliken was endorsed by the McClure political machine by an undisclosed vote.

The primary election was a four-way race for the GOP nomination, with Milliken winning a majority over his rivals. Milliken received 41,553 votes to Edmund Jones, 15,866; Ivan H. "Cy" Peterman, an Upper Darby journalist, 11,683; and Upper Darby 10th Ward commissioner Jack F. Robbins, with 11,240.

The election between Milliken and Earle degenerated into a bitter race, with the latter accusing the former of having converted county funds to his personal use. Specifically, when Milliken was Clerk of Courts, he had used $5,953 in fees paid to the county for his own use, later paying back all of the funds. James J. Connor, the minority County Commissioner, jumped into the fray, declaring that he would ask his fellow commissioners to file suit against Milliken to recover about $1,400 in estimated interest that these funds would have earned. An indignant Milliken said that his actions were not illegal and had been standard practice, at least by his two predecessors in office, and retaliated by filing a criminal libel suit against Earle. Earle was then arrested and posted a $1,000 bail on October 25, but Milliken failed to appear at the magistrate's hearing at the Springfield Township Building that day. The Democrat was undeterred by the lawsuit and continued his attacks the next day at a rally in Chester, offering to withdraw from the campaign and go to jail if Milliken would answer several pointed questions regarding the missing funds.

=== 1959 to 1960 ===
Milliken was sworn in as Delaware County's representative in Congress on January 3, 1959.

After taking office, Milliken was appointed to the House Banking and Currency Committee and introduced several bills in 1959, including one to increase the amount of other income allowed without causing a loss of social security benefits from $1,200 to $1,800. Another bill was to allow the exemption of suburbanites from the Philadelphia wage tax. During the year, he supported President Eisenhower's attempts to hold down federal spending, including numerous vetoes, in 66% of the votes and opposed those efforts 34% of the time. Out of thirty Pennsylvania congressmen, he tied for second place among those supporting economy in government. As a result of these efforts, the budget year ending June 30, 1960, would show a small surplus of $1.2 billion and would be the last budget surplus that would not include the use of the surplus in the trust funds, such as Social Security. Other significant legislation for the year included the approval by the House, 323-89, for Hawaii's admission into the Union, which Milliken supported.

During the following year, Milliken supported funding for the National Aeronautics and Space Administration, as well as the Civil Rights Act of 1960, which allowed for court-appointed referees to help register minorities to vote and efforts to increase the minimum wage. For his first term, Milliken proved to be the strongest supporter of the Eisenhower administration in the Pennsylvania delegation, with an 81% score in support and only 18% in opposition. However, on July 1, he deserted his president, along with many other Republicans, in voting to override the veto of a proposed 7.5% pay raise for federal workers.

=== The 1960 election ===
In 1960, Milliken ran for a second term against Democrat Henry Gouley. On October 7, he charged that rumors that the Philadelphia Mint would be closed or moved were false. He charged that Philadelphia Mayor Richardson Dilworth circulated the story "to scare people in the Philadelphia area during the election campaign" and that an act of Congress was required to approve such plans.

On October 22, Nixon visited Chester, Pennsylvania and spoke to a crowd of about 8,000 at Market Square along with Milliken.

Milliken also campaigned on his own, appearing at the Marcus Hook fire company meeting hall on October 27. He attacked JFK and other Democrats who said that the nation's popularity was at an "all-time low". During Eisenhower's administration, Milliken countered: "The U.S. has never been beaten on a single UN vote" and made a point that U.S. popularity had "undoubtedly suffered in some areas abroad because of continuing Democrat attempts to downgrade America." State Senator Bell also spoke, emphasizing American air power, naval strength, outer space vehicles and hydrogen bombs. The same day, at the Springfield Lions Club meeting at the Deville Diner, both candidates for the Seventh congressional district met. Milliken was introduced by Springfield GOP chairman, Lawrence G. Williams, while Gouley was introduced by Joseph Helwig, the township's Democratic leader. Milliken attacked "extravagant spending by the Democrats" in Congress. His opponent, Gouley, issued a rebuttal, stating that under Eisenhower, spending increased 46% in the past eight years and was 68% higher than under the Roosevelt administration, reaching a record total of $579 billion.

In Delaware County, with the Democrats having a record 59,500 registered voters and Kennedy's strong appeal, Nixon carried the county by only 135,672 to 124,629. With some ticket-splitting, Milliken's plurality was slightly larger than Nixon's, 136,021 to 120,839.

=== The 1962 mid-term election ===
For the 1962 elections, Democrats had two liberal candidates from Philadelphia heading the statewide ticket in addition to a liberal Democrat in the White House. Republicans went on the attack and raised the issue of the likelihood of annexation of Delaware County by the City of Philadelphia. In April, Milliken spoke in Washington to some 300 members of the Delaware County Women's Republican Club, declaring that if Dilworth was elected "...we will have become a part of Philadelphia before his term as governor is up." He further elaborated that if the Democrats win, it "will be the beginning of the end of home rule" for the county and the election will be a "fight for survival for Delaware County". He was joined by William Scranton, who strongly supported Milliken's reelection, emphasizing that the latter had been named to the House appropriations committee at a time when fiscal conservatism was important. James E. Van Zandt joined in, predicting a "voters' rebellion" that will spell victory for the GOP.

By the fall, the campaign rhetoric heated up and became even more exaggerated. On September 24, at another Women's Republican Club function at the Alpine Inn in Springfield, Scranton's solution to crime in Philadelphia was evidently to blame Dilworth for a "reign of terror" in the city "that stops women and children ... from walking even one block to go to the store." Adding further to the fear tactics, Congressman Van Zandt charged that Clark was "soft on Communism". Milliken added the only sensible point: "If this country continues spending as it is doing, it will spend itself into bankruptcy."

Meanwhile, the Democratic candidate for Congress, Chester attorney John A. Reilly, went on the attack, accusing Milliken of "double talk" and expecting to win due to the "complacency of Delaware County voters. I feel they are entitled to learn that Milliken has done nothing constructive in Washington and that he is no more than a puppet for his Chester bosses." He also decried Milliken's raising of "phony issues such as annexation". On October 4, the Upper Darby GOP committee issued a statement: "If the voters of Upper Darby Township want to stop Philadelphia at 63rd Street, they can do so by voting a straight Republican ticket this fall." Meanwhile, in response to Reilly's call for debates, Milliken said that his busy schedule made it impossible to debate. Reilly, in turn, said that the incumbent congressman was "full of phony excuses" and "afraid of the voters". Milliken won easily with 136,955 votes to Reilly's 88,482.

=== War Board Revolt ===
After the 1963 General Election in Delaware County, a power struggle broke out among members of the Republican ruling circles. Milliken had aligned himself with Sam Dickey from Upper Darby against McClure in an attempt to take over the War Board. McClure had attempted to appoint Upper Darby Township Commissioner George Hill, a former Dickey rival, to the War Board, rather than a representative chosen by Dickey. The Upper Darby Board of Commissioners, in their other capacity as GOP ward leaders, voted to nominate Dickey himself to the War Board.

By early 1964, the War Board split had attracted four other Republican candidates for Milliken's seat: Harold Ervin of Media; John G. Pew, replacing Swing on the War Board; attorney Stephen McEwen of Upper Darby; and former county commissioner Watkins. Matters came to a head on February 7, when the War Board endorsed Watkins over Milliken, citing the latter's poor health as the reason for rejection. Milliken received only one vote, presumably his own, in the War Board polling.

Later that month, the Collingdale Republican leaders followed the lead of Glenolden, Darby, Prospect Park and Tinicum, in dumping Milliken as its representative on the War Board. There was some measure of suspense as Milliken pondered another race, this time as an independent, but on February 18, he issued a terse statement: "After consideration, I have decided not to be a candidate for reelection to the U.S. Congress."

Milliken served out the last year of his term, until January 3, 1965, but would surface again as a candidate in 1966, unsuccessfully bucking his party's leadership.

He died in Ridley Park on July 4, 1969, and was interred at Arlington Cemetery in Lansdowne, Pennsylvania.

== Sources ==
- United States Congress. "William H. Milliken Jr. (id: M000770)". Biographical Directory of the United States Congress.
- The Political Graveyard
- National Archives Interview Notes
- News of Delaware County, Delaware County Daily Times, Evening Bulletin, Philadelphia Inquirer, Bulletin Almanac.

U.S. House of Representatives
Preceded by Benjamin F. James	Member of the U.S. House of Representatives from Pennsylvania's 7th congressional district 1959–1965	Succeeded by G. Robert Watkins
