= Devils–Flyers rivalry =

National Hockey League rivalry

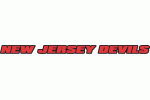
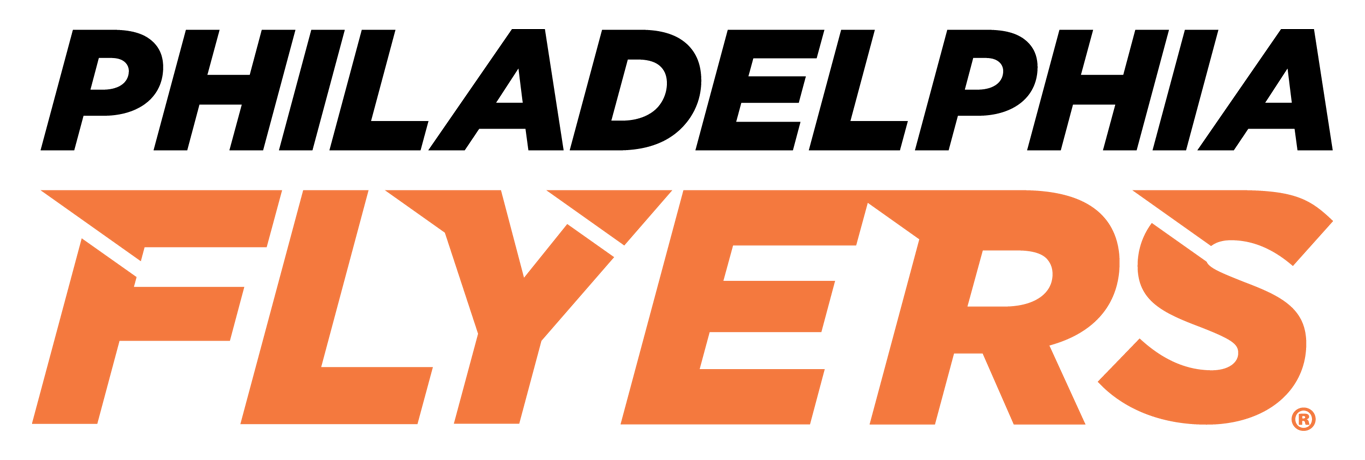
- New Jersey Devils Philadelphia Flyers
- First meeting: October 18, 1982
- Latest meeting: October 1, 2026
- Next meeting: January 23, 2027

Statistics
- Total meetings: 269
- All-time series: 137–108–15–9 (NJD) (Note: This does not include the Flyers' combined 30–4–3–0 record against the Kansas City Scouts and the Colorado Rockies.)
- Regular season series: 123–94–15–9 (NJD)
- Postseason results: 14–14 (tie)
- Largest victory: NJD 7–0 PHI; February 25, 2023
- Longest win streak: PHI W9
- Current win streak: NJD W1

Postseason history
- 1995 conference finals: Devils won, 4–2; 2000 conference finals: Devils won, 4–3; 2004 conference quarterfinals: Flyers won, 4–1; 2010 conference quarterfinals: Flyers won, 4–1; 2012 conference semifinals: Devils won, 4–1

The Devils–Flyers rivalry is a National Hockey League (NHL) rivalry between the New Jersey Devils and the Philadelphia Flyers. Both teams play in the Metropolitan Division of the Eastern Conference. This rivalry has become quite intense in New Jersey itself, sometimes referred to as the "Battle of the Jersey Turnpike", with the northern part of the state being the Devils fanbase, while the southern part of the state is overwhelmingly Flyers fans due to South Jersey's proximity to Philadelphia. The Flyers practice at their training facility in Voorhees Township, New Jersey, and since their Stanley Cup days of 1974 and 1975, many members of the Cup teams (as well as other Flyers alumni) have lived in South Jersey.

From the time the conferences were realigned and renamed before the 1993–94 season until the next realignment at the end of the 2013–14 season, the two teams won a combined total of 15 division championships of the 19 titles from the original Atlantic Division, 9–6 in the Devils' favor.

== History ==
=== Early years ===
Before relocating to New Jersey, the only notable confrontation between these two franchises occurred in the 1978 Stanley Cup preliminary round where the Flyers swept the previously located Colorado Rockies in two games. Although these two teams faced each other regularly after the Devils' relocation from Denver in 1982, the New Jersey–Philadelphia rivalry did not take off until their first playoff meeting in the lockout-shortened 1994–95 season, when the Devils eliminated the Flyers in six games in the 1995 conference finals en route to winning the Stanley Cup. The turning point of the series came in game five, when Claude Lemieux scored from 65 feet out, sending a wobbly puck past Flyers goaltender Ron Hextall with 44 seconds left in regulation of a tie game. The series was an upset, as the Devils were the fifth seed in the Eastern Conference, while the Flyers had made a dramatic improvement to end their five-year playoff drought by winning the division and getting the second seed in the Eastern Conference. The Flyers were led by eventual Hart Memorial Trophy winner, captain Eric Lindros; Lindros and Devils captain Scott Stevens were afterwards known for their on-ice feuds.

During the 1999–2000 regular season, the Devils were leading in both the Eastern Conference and the Atlantic Division, but their 10-game slump near the end of the season resulted in the Flyers overtaking them for both the division title and the first seed in the conference. They would meet once again in the 2000 conference finals; this time, the Flyers blew a 3–1 series lead over the Devils, including losing three of the four games played in Philadelphia. The seventh game of this series was the final game for Lindros as a Flyer, who suffered a concussion at the hands of Stevens, whose controversial hit was viewed by some as the key moment of the Devils' playoff run. The Devils went on to win the 2000 Stanley Cup by beating the defending champion Dallas Stars in six games.

=== 21st century ===
The Flyers finally defeated the Devils in the playoffs in 2003–04 when they eliminated the defending Cup champions in a five-game series in the 2004 Eastern Conference quarterfinals. The Flyers also defeated the Devils in the 2010 Eastern Conference quarterfinals, again in five games, en route to the Stanley Cup Final. The latter series was considered a big upset, as the Devils won the Atlantic Division and the second seed in the conference, while the Flyers clinched the seventh seed in a shootout victory over the New York Rangers on the last day of the regular season. The Flyers finished with a combined regular season and playoff record of 9–2 against the Devils in 2009–10.

In the 2006–07 season, Devils' goaltender Martin Brodeur broke Philadelphia legend Bernie Parent's single-season wins record of 47 by earning his 48th win against the Flyers. Flyers fans booed Brodeur and the milestone was not announced by the Flyers' public address (PA) announcers, Lou Nolan at the game's end. Nevertheless, Parent offered his praise, even though he did not have the benefit of overtime or shootouts in his era (12 of Brodeur's 48 wins were in overtime or the shootout). Brodeur also notched his 500th career victory at Philadelphia's Wachovia Center in 2007–08. This time, the milestone was announced by the PA announcer and was booed. Furthermore, on March 1, 2009, Brodeur recorded his 100th career regular season shutout during a home game versus the Flyers. Brodeur recorded 27 saves in the 3–0 victory.

On October 25, 2008, the Devils played the Flyers at the Wachovia Center where the Flyers won the game 3–2 in overtime. During the overtime period, Flyers forward Simon Gagné attempted to a score a goal that hit the crossbar. The referee ruled no goal and a replay review confirmed the call. Afterwards, a fan threw a road flare onto the ice that caused smoke to halt play. The fan who threw the flare ran out of the 11th Street exit of the arena but when the PA announcer asked the crowd to point out the culprit, the home crowd pointed out an innocent Devils fan.

In 2010–11, both teams were seemingly headed in different directions. The Devils finished under .500 for the first time since 1990–91 and missed the playoffs, while the Flyers led the Atlantic Division steadily and won the division in their final game of the season.

Subsequent results proved otherwise. The teams met in the 2012 Eastern Conference semifinals, with the Flyers being heavily favored after dismantling Stanley Cup favorite Pittsburgh in the first round. However, after losing game one, New Jersey won the next four to win the series, 4–1, en route to the Stanley Cup Final. New Jersey's victory in game four occurred on Brodeur's 40th birthday, giving him playoff victories over the Flyers in his 20s, 30s, and 40s. The series was characterized by a relentless Devils' forecheck and a virtual shutdown of Philadelphia's offensive weapons. The Devils advanced to defeat the rival New York Rangers in the Eastern Conference finals. However, the trend of defeating the Flyers en route to winning the Stanley Cup was broken when the Los Angeles Kings, coincidentally featuring former Flyers Mike Richards, Simon Gagné, Justin Williams, Jeff Carter and John Stevens defeated the Devils 4–2 to win their first Stanley Cup.

The 2012–13 marked the first time that both the Devils and Flyers missed the playoffs since the Devils started playing in New Jersey. From 1982–83 to 2011–12, the Devils missed the playoffs eight times and the Flyers six times but never at the same time.

The rivalry was played outdoors for the first time during the 2023–24 season when the two teams met in the 2024 Stadium Series at MetLife Stadium on February 17, 2024. The Devils won the game 6–3. It was the Devils' second outdoor game in history, and their first victory, following the 2014 Stadium Series where the team was also the designated home team even though the game was played at Yankee Stadium in New York City against their other rivals, the New York Rangers. It was the sixth outdoor game for the Flyers, who have previously played in the 2010 and 2012 Winter Classics, the 2017 and 2019 Stadium Series, and the 2021 NHL Outdoors at Lake Tahoe series.

== Rivalry outside NHL ==
The rivalry has taken on an even further extension; the Flyers had an ECHL affiliate in Trenton, New Jersey, the Trenton Titans, from 1999 to 2006, when the team was sold to the Devils, which flipped the team's affiliation after the 2006–07 ECHL season and nickname to reflect its new ownership and identity, rebranding as the Trenton Devils. Intending to establish the Devils fanbase further south in New Jersey, the rebranding instead alienated a large segment of fans in the central New Jersey area, where the Flyers have a significantly larger fanbase than the Devils. Coupled with poor performance on the ice (missing the playoffs three out of four seasons) and attendance figures near the bottom of the league, the Trenton Devils suspended operations in July 2011. A week later, the franchise was revived under the original Titans brand and reestablished affiliation with the Flyers.

For several years, the American Hockey League had a rivalry between the Adirondack Red Wings and Capital District Islanders/Albany River Rats, both served by Interstate 87. After the former team folded, the area was without an AHL team until 2009, when the Philadelphia Phantoms moved and became the Adirondack Phantoms, still affiliated with the Flyers. The River Rats moved to Charlotte and were replaced by the Albany Devils in 2010, so the Adirondack-Albany rivalry took on new significance due to the teams' parent clubs until 2014 when the Phantoms moved to Lehigh Valley.

== See also ==
- List of NHL rivalries
- Flyers–Rangers rivalry
- Flyers–Islanders rivalry
- Eagles–Giants rivalry
- Mets–Phillies rivalry
