= Flyers–Islanders rivalry =

National Hockey League rivalry

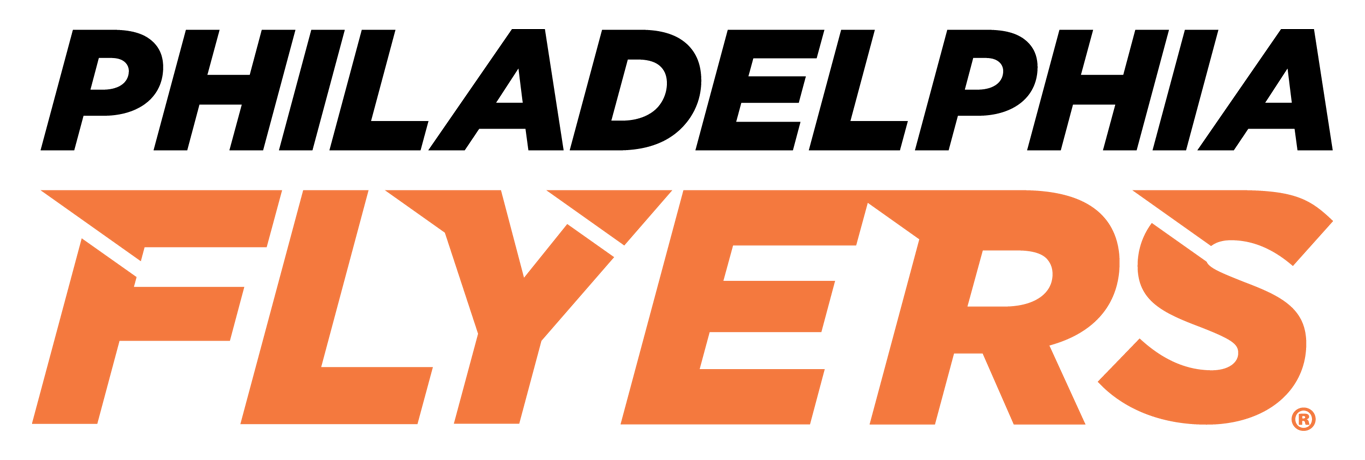
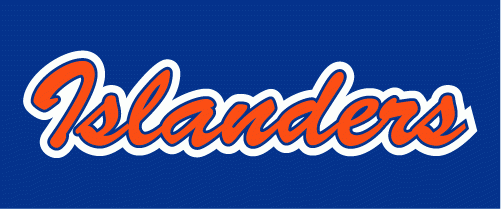
- Philadelphia Flyers New York Islanders
- First meeting: November 22, 1972
- Latest meeting: April 3, 2026
- Next meeting: November 28, 2026

Statistics
- Total meetings: 332
- All-time series: 167–120–26–19 (PHI)
- Regular season series: 150–105–26–19 (PHI)
- Postseason results: 17–15 (PHI)
- Largest victory: PHI 10–2 NYI; March 31, 1973
- Longest win streak: PHI W15
- Current win streak: PHI W1

Postseason history
- 1975 semifinals: Flyers won, 4–3; 1980 Stanley Cup Final: Islanders won, 4–2; 1985 division finals: Flyers won, 4–1; 1987 division finals: Flyers won, 4–3; 2020 second round: Islanders won, 4–3

The Flyers–Islanders rivalry is a National Hockey League (NHL) rivalry between the Philadelphia Flyers and New York Islanders. Both teams compete in the Metropolitan Division of the Eastern Conference. The rivalry originates from the first playoff meeting between the two teams in 1975, and saw its peak during the late 1970s and early 1980s, as the two teams were perennial Stanley Cup contenders and met in the Stanley Cup playoffs three more times in the span of 13 years. After the 1980s, the rivalry saw a decline until a brief resurgence in 2020, when the two teams met for the fifth time in the playoffs. Both teams have competed in the same division together since the 1974–75 season. Along with the history behind the several playoff meetings between the two teams, the rivalry is also influenced by the proximity between the city of Philadelphia and the New York area, similar to the Flyers–Rangers and Devils–Flyers rivalries.

== History ==
=== 1970s ===
Both the Flyers and Islanders, two expansion teams established in 1967 and 1972, respectively, saw success and winning early into their franchises histories, something unusual among most expansion franchises in NHL history. By the time the two teams met for their first playoff matchup in the 1975 semifinals, the Flyers had just won the Stanley Cup in the previous season, in just their seventh season of existence. The Islanders were making their first playoff appearance in just their third season of existence. The Islanders had advanced to the semifinals after becoming the second team in NHL history to come back from a 3–0 series deficit, as they defeated the Pittsburgh Penguins in seven games. In the series, the Flyers, the first seed, jumped to a 3–0 series lead over the Islanders. However, the Islanders responded by winning the next three games to force a game seven, but unlike their quarterfinal matchup, they were unable to complete the comeback, as the Flyers prevailed in game seven, 4–1. The Flyers advanced to the Stanley Cup Final and defeated the Buffalo Sabres to win their second straight Stanley Cup. Both teams would continue to be playoff contenders for the remainder of the decade.

=== 1980s ===
The most well-known moment of the rivalry came in 1980, when the two teams met in the Stanley Cup Final. The Islanders made their first finals appearance in franchise history, while the Flyers made their fourth appearance in the finals in seven years, and they came off a regular season where they went on a North American sports record 35-game undefeated streak that still holds as of 2025, paving the way for a regular season championship and home-ice advantage throughout the playoffs as the #1 seed. Despite this, the Islanders took game one of the series in overtime, 4–3, and quickly took a 3–1 series lead. The Flyers took game five, but the Islanders would win another close overtime finish in game six, 5–4, to clinch their first Stanley Cup win in franchise history. The game six Islanders victory did not come without controversy, as the replay showed that an offside call should have been made against Islanders center Butch Goring just before right-wing Duane Sutter scored a goal to give the Islanders a 2–1 lead in the game. Linesman Leon Stickle would later admit after the game that he had missed the offside call. The controversy of the missed call and its effect on the result of the series created a legacy of animosity between the two teams and their respective fanbases for years to come.

In April 1980, Bill Lyon wrote of the rivalry:

[T]he two teams have developed a rivalry that bubbles like tar in August, that shimmers like heat waves off an expressway in the dog days of summer. The Flyers and Islanders have if not downright hatred, at least a healthy dislike. . . . a rivalry that conjures up memories of the Brooklyn Dodgers against the Yankees in the World Series, or Philadelphia against Boston in the [NBA], or Green Bay vs. Dallas in older [NFL] times. Or maybe even the intensity of the United States against Russia in Lake Placid ..."

In the next four seasons, the Flyers would continue to make the playoffs each year but would only advance to the second round twice. Meanwhile, the Islanders would embark on a dynasty, winning three more Stanley Cups and making four more Stanley Cup Final appearances. The two teams met again in the 1985 division finals. Unlike 1980, the Flyers would easily handle the Islanders, jumping to a 3–0 series lead and winning in five games, denying the Islanders a chance at a sixth-straight Stanley Cup Final appearance. The Flyers would ultimately advance to the Stanley Cup Final, where they would fall to the Edmonton Oilers in five games.

In 1987, the teams met in the playoffs for the fourth time in 13 years for the division finals. This division finals series between the two teams was much more competitive than in 1985, with the series going to seven games. The Flyers ultimately defeated the Islanders 5–1 in the deciding game. The Flyers went on to make their second Stanley Cup Final appearance in three years, but would once again lose to the Oilers, this time in seven games.

=== 1990s–present ===
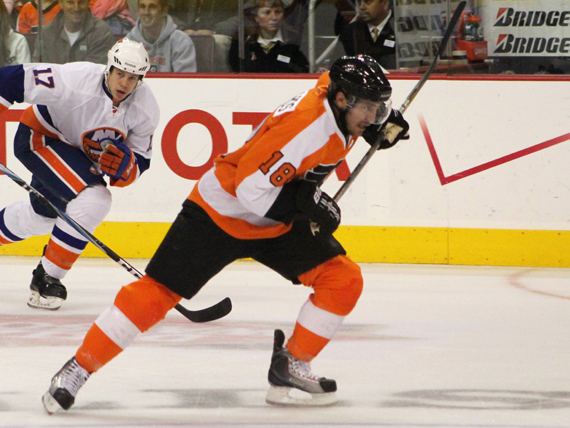
Islanders left winger Matt Martin (left) and Flyers center Mike Richards (right) in a 2010 game

The rivalry began decline in 1992 with the reorganization of the NHL and the elimination of the Patrick Division in which the teams had competed. In 2001, Peter Botte of the New York Daily News wrote: "There once was something called the Patrick Division in the NHL, and the fierce Islanders-Flyers rivalry was among the best parts of it."

Both teams began to decline after the 1987 playoff matchup, with the Islanders missing the playoffs for the first time in 14 years in 1989 and the Flyers missing the playoffs for the first time in 17 years in 1990. The rivalry effectively became dormant for the next 30 years, although both teams played each other competitively in the 1990s. The Islanders began a seven-season playoff drought while the Flyers began a streak of 11 consecutive playoff appearances in the 1994–95 season. The Flyers dominated the head-to-head record in the 2000s, however, including a 15–game win streak over the Islanders from 2008–2010. By the end of the 2010s, the two teams were both playoff contenders once again, competing in the Metropolitan Division of the Eastern Conference, formed in the 2013–14 NHL season. In 2020, the Flyers and Islanders met for the fifth time in the playoffs (the first time in 33 years) during the Eastern Conference second round. The Flyers held the first seed in the Eastern Conference, and came into the series favored over the Islanders. However, the Islanders won in seven games in a fiercely-contested series that featured three overtime finishes. The Islanders advanced to the Eastern Conference finals for the first time since 1993, but fell to the eventual Stanley Cup champion Tampa Bay Lightning in six games.

== See also ==
- List of NHL rivalries
- Flyers–Rangers rivalry
- Devils–Flyers rivalry
- Eagles–Giants rivalry
- Mets–Phillies rivalry
