= Flyers–Rangers rivalry =

National Hockey League rivalry

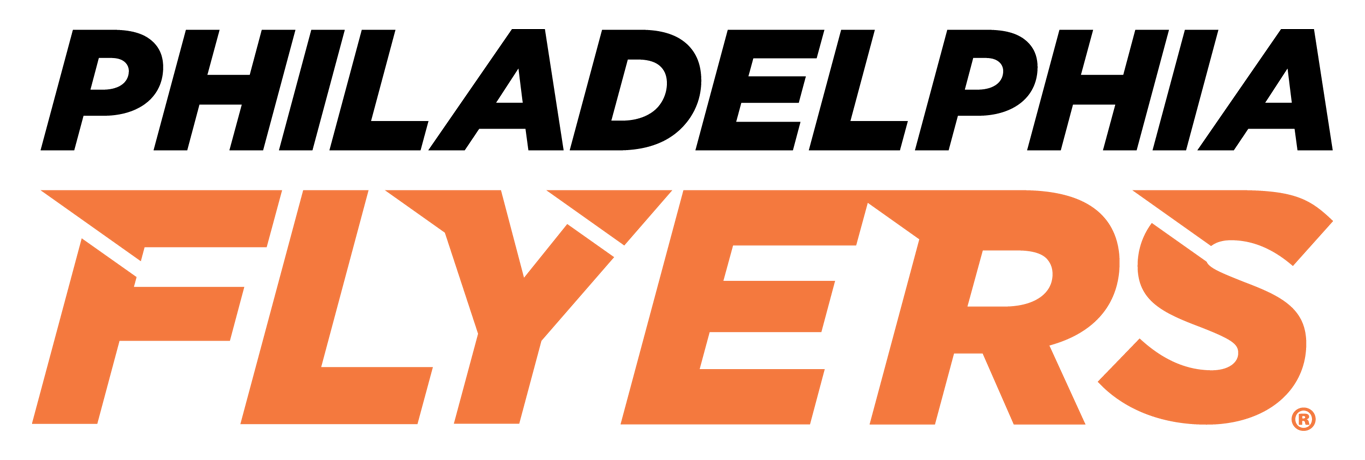
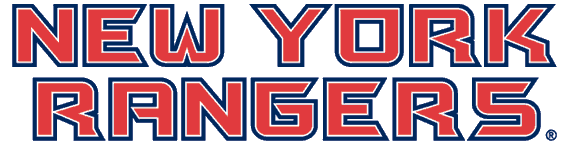
- Philadelphia Flyers New York Rangers
- First meeting: November 16, 1967
- Latest meeting: November 5, 2026
- Next meeting: December 16, 2026

Statistics
- Total meetings: 381
- All-time series: 174–158–37–12 (NYR)
- Regular season series: 150–128–37–12 (NYR)
- Postseason results: 30–24 (PHI)
- Largest victory: NYR 9–0 PHI; March 17, 2021
- Longest win streak: NYR W7
- Current win streak: NYR W2

Postseason history
- 1974 semifinals: Flyers won, 4–3; 1979 quarterfinals: Rangers won, 4–1; 1980 quarterfinals: Flyers won, 4–1; 1982 division semifinals: Rangers won, 3–1; 1983 division Semifinals: Rangers won, 3–0; 1985 division semifinals: Flyers won, 3–0; 1986 division semifinals: Rangers won, 3–2; 1987 division semifinals: Flyers won, 4–2; 1995 conference semifinals: Flyers won, 4–0; 1997 conference finals: Flyers won, 4–1; 2014 first round: Rangers won, 4–3

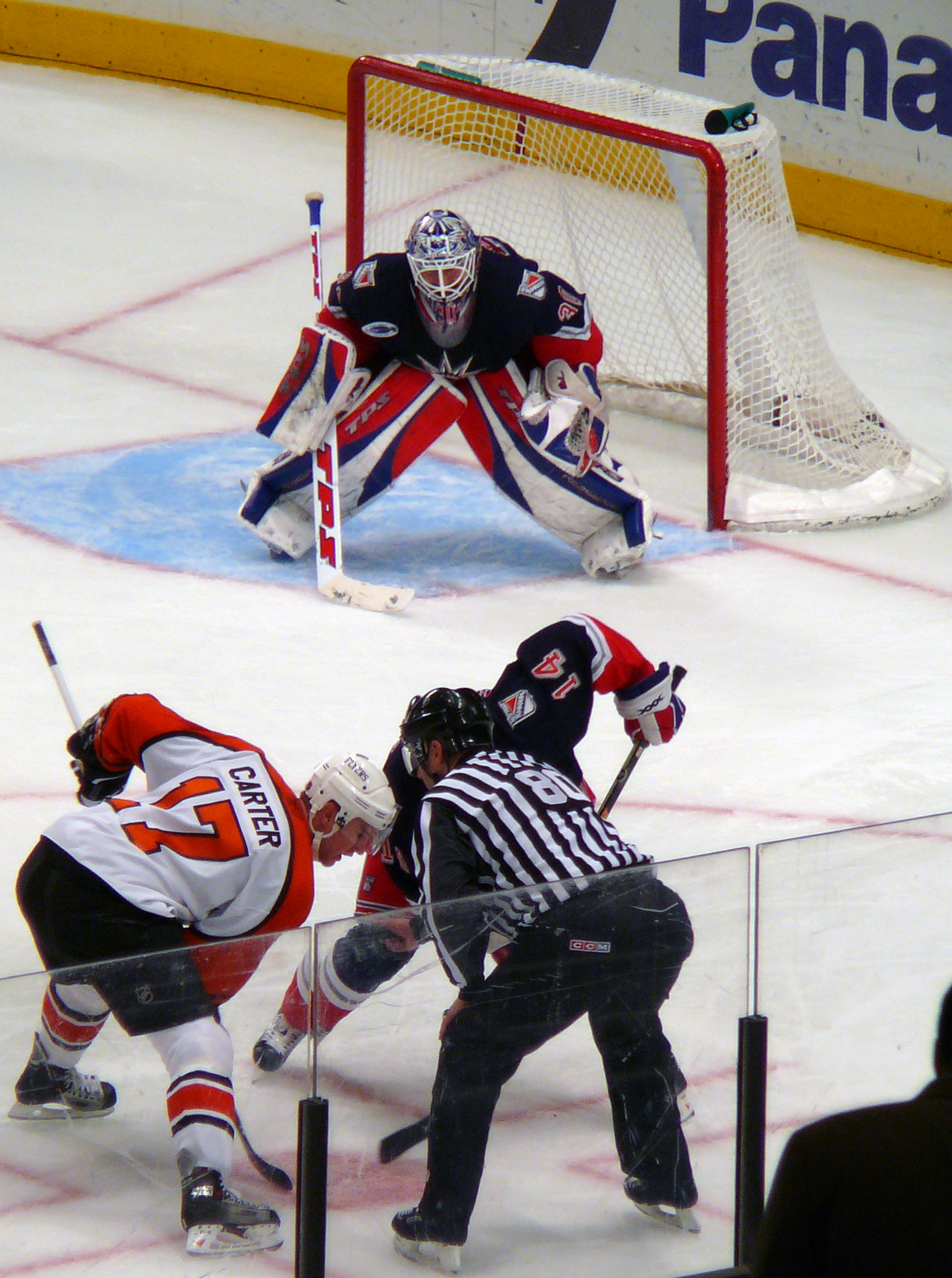
Flyers center Jeff Carter takes a faceoff in front of Rangers goaltender Henrik Lundqvist.

The Flyers–Rangers rivalry (also commonly referred to as Broadway versus Broad Street) is a National Hockey League (NHL) rivalry between the Philadelphia Flyers and New York Rangers. Both teams met 11 times in the Stanley Cup playoffs, with the Flyers winning six and the Rangers winning five of the series, and they have been division rivals since the 1974–NHL season. The ferocity of the rivalry can also be attributed to the geographic New York–Philadelphia rivalry, which is mirrored in both the National Football League's Eagles–Giants rivalry and the Major League Baseball's Mets–Phillies rivalry.

== History ==
=== 1970s ===
In 1974, the Flyers eliminated the Rangers in the semifinals. The series went seven games, with the Rangers sealing their own fate, taking a too many men penalty in the waning moments of the game while trying to replace the goaltender with an extra attacker. The home team won all seven games of the series as a result, and it marked the first time an expansion team had defeated an Original Six team in a playoff series.

The Flyers went on to win their first of back-to-back Stanley Cups. The day after the Flyers won the Cup, more than two million people—one of them, future Ranger goaltender Mike Richter —lined Broad Street for a ticker-tape parade. Richter grew up in Flourtown, Pa., near Philadelphia, idolizing Flyers goaltender Bernie Parent.

The Rangers defeated the Flyers in five games in the 1979 quarterfinals en route to a Stanley Cup Final berth; the Flyers did the same to New York in 1980. During the 1979 series, the Rangers outscored the Flyers 28–8.

During this period, Fred Shero coached the Flyers to back-to-back Stanley Cups in 1974 and 1975 and the Rangers to the 1979 Final. At the end of the 1977–78 season, Shero submitted a letter of resignation stating the Flyers needed a change whether they realized it or not, despite having one more year remaining on his contract. Flyers management heard rumors about Shero wanting to leave Philadelphia and re-join the Rangers organization, and refused to accept his letter of resignation. Shero then signed a $250,000, five-year contract with the Rangers to be their new head coach and general manager, believing he no longer had a contract with the Flyers. A few weeks after signing Shero, the Rangers gave the Flyers their first-round pick in the 1978 draft (Ken Linseman) and cash as compensation, allowing the Rangers to avoid tampering charges.

=== 1980s ===
The Rangers and Flyers met in the playoffs six times ranging from the 1979–80 to 1986–87 seasons. In 1980, the Flyers had the league's best record with 116 points and played the Rangers in the second round. They took a commanding 3–0 series lead, New York avoided the sweep, but the Flyers won at home in game five to clinch it. In 1982, the teams met in the first round with the Rangers having home-ice advantage. The Flyers won the first game, but the remaining three were big wins for the Rangers as they advanced to the next round against their crosstown rivals, the New York Islanders. The next season, Philadelphia had home-ice advantage in the first round, having a much stronger regular season, finishing with 106 points to the Rangers' 80. However, the Rangers defeated the Flyers twice on the road, then came back to New York and routed them 9–3 to complete the sweep. However, they were subsequently eliminated by the Islanders for the third consecutive year. In 1985, the Flyers once again won the division and hosted the Rangers in round one. Although the games were close—including game one which went into overtime — the Flyers swept the series. They advanced to the Stanley Cup Final but lost to the Edmonton Oilers. In 1986, the division-winning Flyers once again hosted the lower-seeded Rangers in the Patrick Division semifinals. This series went back and forth with neither team winning two in a row. The Rangers defeated the Flyers in game one, but the Flyers tied the series the next day. The series came to New York and Rangers retook the series lead, but Philly annihilated them 7–1 in game four to bring it back home. The Rangers won the decisive game five and advanced. The next season, the pattern repeated itself and the Flyers hosted the Rangers in round one again. However, this time the format changed and the first round was a best-of-seven series rather than a best-of-five. All but one of the games was won by three or more goals. The Rangers shut out the Flyers in game one, but the Flyers came back and won the next two games 8–3 and 3–0 respectively. The Rangers successfully tied the series, but the Flyers took the next one at home and shut out the Rangers in game six at Madison Square Garden to advance. The Flyers had another fantastic season and won the conference, but again lost to Edmonton in the Final, this time just one win away from winning the Stanley Cup.

=== 1990s ===
In June 1992, the Flyers and the Rangers found themselves as the top two bidders for the rights to much-heralded prospect Eric Lindros, who had been drafted first overall by the Quebec Nordiques at the 1991 NHL entry draft but did not sign with them because he refused to play for Quebec. On the first day of the 1992 NHL entry draft, the Flyers believed they had reached a deal with the Nordiques to acquire Lindros. However, Nordiques president Marcel Aubut reneged on the agreement, saying he had reached a deal with the Rangers instead. The Flyers filed for arbitration and on June 26, the Flyers were awarded Lindros' rights by arbitrator Larry Bertuzzi in exchange for Steve Duchesne, Peter Forsberg, Ron Hextall, Kerry Huffman, Mike Ricci, Chris Simon, the Flyers' first-round draft picks in 1993 and 1994 and $15 million.

The Flyers and Rangers renewed their playoff rivalry once more when the two teams met in the playoffs in 1995 and 1997, both series being won by Philadelphia. The first series was bitter for the Rangers—the Flyers' four-game sweep eliminated the defending Cup champions in the Eastern Conference semifinals. Many Flyers fans remember this for the second game the Flyers won in overtime. Kevin Haller scored, sending normally laid-back Flyers color analyst Gary Dornhoefer into a frenzy. The latter series was the Eastern Conference finals that sent the Flyers to the Stanley Cup Final. With a 4–1 series win, it marked the last time the Rangers would make the playoffs until 2006, and it later turned out to be both Wayne Gretzky's and Mark Messier's last playoff game.

=== 21st century ===
In August 2001, the Flyers traded Eric Lindros' rights to the Rangers in exchange for Pavel Brendl, Jan Hlaváč, Kim Johnsson and a third-round pick in the 2003 NHL entry draft. Lindros sat out the 2000–01 season due to concussion symptoms and a highly publicized feud with Flyers general manager Bobby Clarke. 2001–02 saw a moment of peace in the rivalry. Just nine days after the terrorist attacks on America, the two teams played a pre-season game in Philadelphia. When the third period was about to begin, President George W. Bush addressed congress and America about the war on terrorism. After his speech, the teams opted not to play the third period, and the game ended in a 2–2 tie; afterwards, the two teams shook hands in a show of respect.

==== 2009–10: Flyers' run to the Stanley Cup Final ====
On December 4, 2009, the Flyers added further heat to the rivalry in firing head coach John Stevens and replacing him with Peter Laviolette. On March 17, 2009, John Tortorella, who was hired as coach of the Rangers after Tom Renney was fired almost a month before, surpassed Laviolette as the winningest-American born coach. The hiring of Laviolette made the rivalry a battle for the most wins by an American-born head coach.

The Flyers' Cinderella run to the Stanley Cup Final began on April 11, the final day of the regular season, when they met the Rangers in a winner-take-all match-up for the final playoff spot. Philadelphia defeated New York 2–1 in a historic shootout, the first do or die shootout for a playoff spot in NHL history. The Rangers' Jody Shelley (who signed with the Flyers in the ensuing off-season) scored the first Rangers goal, in the first period, but Matt Carle tied it for the Flyers in the third period to send the game to overtime, then to a shootout. Claude Giroux scored for the Flyers in the first round of the shootout while goaltender Brian Boucher stopped final shooter Olli Jokinen to win the game for the Flyers. With the win, the Flyers eliminated the Rangers from the playoff contention, holding off their late season surge in which they went 7–1–2 to close the season.

In the Final, the Flyers played the Chicago Blackhawks, losing in six games and losing the deciding game in overtime to give the Blackhawks their first Stanley Cup since 1961. During the run, Flyers left winger James van Riemsdyk told Rich Chere of The Star-Ledger that his earliest memory of the Stanley Cup playoffs came when the Rangers won the 1994 Stanley Cup and watching Mike Richter stop Pavel Bure's penalty shot.

==== 2010–present ====
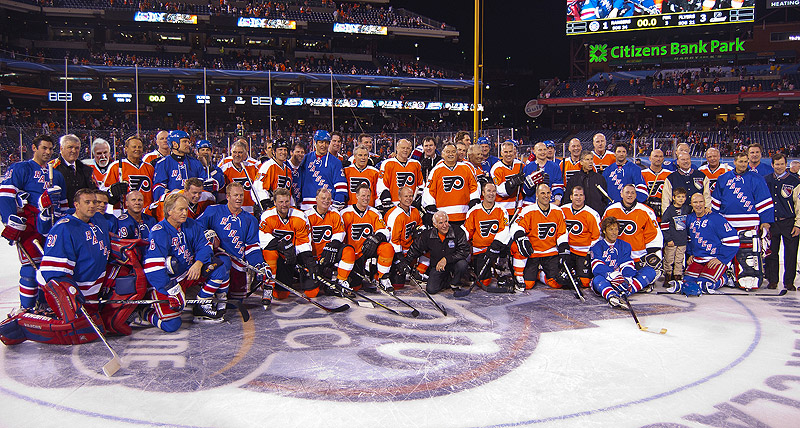
Former Flyers and Rangers players pose after the Alumni Game, held as part of the 2012 NHL Winter Classic

In the 2010–11 season, the Flyers won four of the six meetings against the Rangers and the rivalry was played out three times on NBC, including the meeting on February 20, which was part of the first ever Hockey Day in America (the game was aired in the majority of homes, however, people in the Buffalo and Washington markets saw the game between the Washington Capitals and Buffalo Sabres), and again on March 6. The Flyers finished the season 47–23–12 and won their sixth Atlantic Division title, finishing second in the Eastern Conference, while the Rangers, with a record of 44–33–5, finished third in the division, behind the Flyers and the Pittsburgh Penguins, but it took them until the final day of the season to clinch a playoff spot, finishing eighth in the East.

On June 21, 2011, The New York Times reported the Rangers and the Flyers would be playing each other in the 2012 NHL Winter Classic on January 2, 2012, at Citizens Bank Park, the home stadium of the Philadelphia Phillies. The NHL formally announced the event on September 26. The Rangers won the Winter Classic 3–2.

The Rangers went on to win all six meetings with the Flyers in the 2011–12 season. They steadily led the Atlantic Division and won first place in the Eastern Conference in the final meeting between the two teams during the season. In the 2012–13 season, which was shortened due to the lockout, Rangers defeated the Flyers in three out of five regular season meetings. The teams split their regular season series 2–2 in 2013–14. In the 2014 Eastern Conference first round, the Rangers and Flyers played each other in the first year of the new playoff format. Rangers finished second in the Metropolitan and Flyers finished third. The Rangers' struggles to take a two-game series lead showed themselves once again against the Flyers. They took game one and lost game two at home against Flyers goaltender Ray Emery while their starting goaltender Steve Mason was injured. Mason's return came in late in game three when the Rangers had already established a large lead. He would start and finish every remaining game in the series. He played a very solid game four in Philadelphia and gave his Flyers team a good chance to tie the series at two games apiece, which they did. The Rangers took game five at home, while the Flyers Wayne Simmonds scored a hat-trick to help Philadelphia avoid elimination in game six at home. But the Rangers outscored the Flyers 2–1 in a decisive game seven to advance to the second round, in which they played the Pittsburgh Penguins, the Flyers' hated rivals. They ended up advancing to the Stanley Cup Final that year for the first time in two decades.

During the 2014–15 season, the two teams met three times in late November, including the Thanksgiving showdown. The Rangers won all three of these in an 11-day span; backup goaltender Cam Talbot shut out the Flyers in the first two meetings and Henrik Lundqvist stood in net for the third. Flyers won the fourth a final meeting in the second half of the season. The following year the Flyers won each of the first two matchups between the teams: the first one being a 3–2 shootout victory, the second being a 3–0 shutout. The Rangers won the next one in an overtime shootout. The fourth meeting which was in Philadelphia was filled with physical aggressive play from both ends. Wayne Simmons received a game misconduct for punching Rangers' captain Ryan McDonagh in the jaw after the defenseman hit him with a high stick. Several roughing, slashing and fighting penalties were assessed throughout the game, and the Flyers scored a powerplay goal. The Rangers tied the game with their net empty at 2–2 with under 13 seconds remaining in regulation, then won the game in yet another shootout.

== Causes ==
The rivalry stems and attributes to two factors. Both teams are in the same division and the proximity between the cities of New York City and Philadelphia, which are approximately 90 minutes apart by car. The Rangers' fanbase comes from the New York metropolitan area, which includes southern Connecticut, and northern and central New Jersey and the Lower Hudson Valley. Conversely, the Flyers' fanbase generally draws from the Philadelphia metropolitan area, which includes southeastern Pennsylvania, central New Jersey south of Princeton, southern New Jersey, northern Delaware and extreme northeast parts of Maryland.

The New York City–Philadelphia rivalry is evident in other sports (for example, the Mets–Phillies rivalry in Major League Baseball, Eagles–Giants rivalry in the National Football League), and the New York Red Bulls–Philadelphia Union rivalry in Major League Soccer.

== See also ==
- List of NHL rivalries
- Devils–Flyers rivalry
- Flyers–Islanders rivalry
- Mets–Phillies rivalry
- Eagles–Giants rivalry
