= Eagles–Giants rivalry =

National Football League rivalry

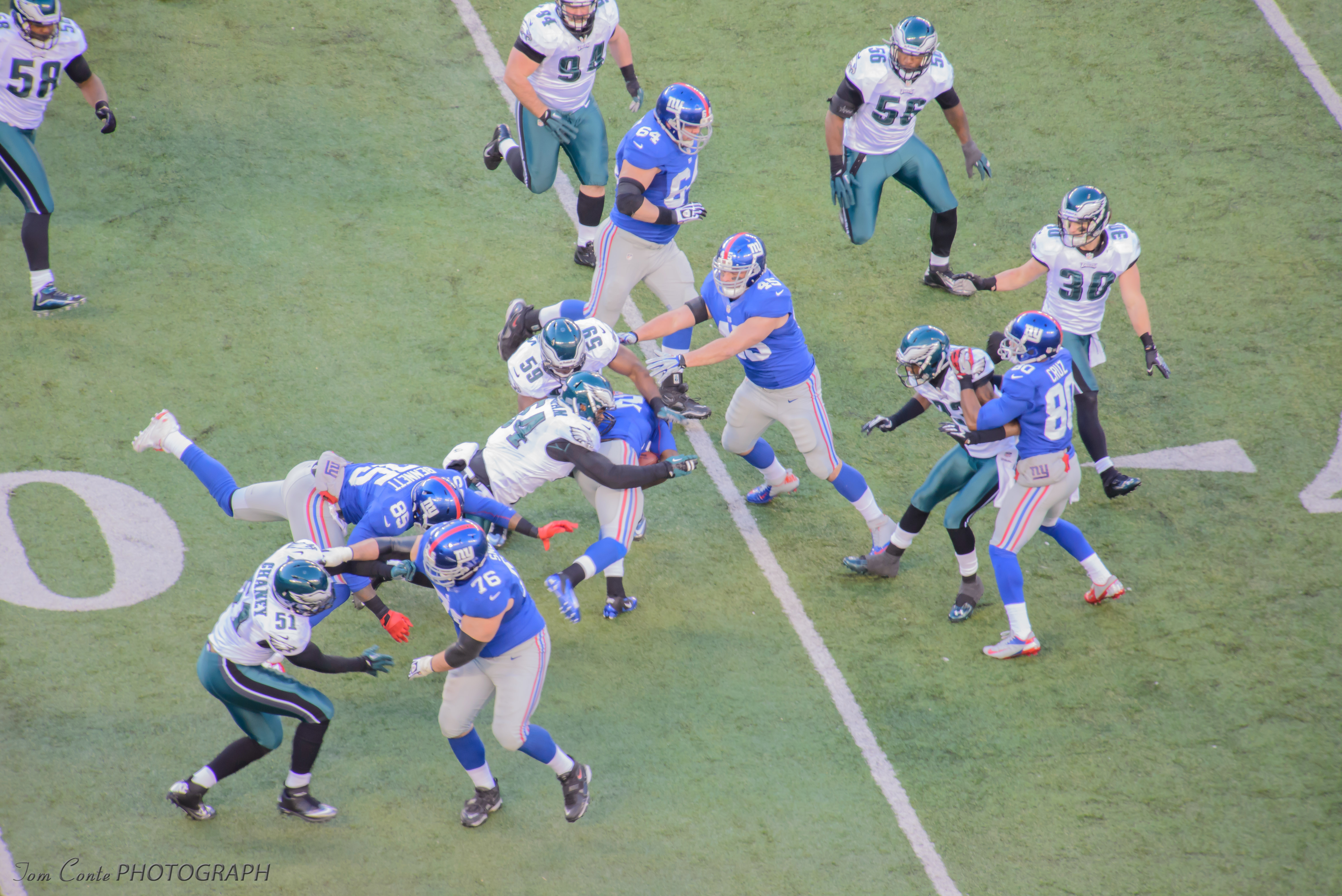
- Eagles and Giants face off during the 2012 season.

- Philadelphia Eagles New York Giants
- Location: Philadelphia, New York City
- First meeting: October 15, 1933; Giants 56, Eagles 0
- Latest meeting: November 8, 2026; Giants 19, Eagles 11
- Next meeting: 2027
- Stadiums: Eagles: Lincoln Financial Field; Giants: MetLife Stadium

Statistics
- Total meetings: 190
- All-time series: Eagles: 97–91–2
- Regular season series: Eagles: 94–89–2
- Postseason results: Eagles: 3–2
- Largest victory: Eagles: 45–0 (1948); Giants: 56–0 (1933)
- Most points scored: Eagles: 49 (1959); Giants: 62 (1972)
- Longest win streak: Eagles: 12 (1975–1981); Giants: 9 (1938–1942; 1997–2001)
- Current win streak: Giants: 1 (2026–present)

Post–season history
- 1981 NFC Wild Card: Giants won: 27–21; 2000 NFC Divisional: Giants won: 20–10; 2006 NFC Wild Card: Eagles won: 23–20; 2008 NFC Divisional: Eagles won: 23–11; 2022 NFC Divisional: Eagles won: 38–7

The Eagles–Giants rivalry is a National Football League (NFL) rivalry between the Philadelphia Eagles and New York Giants.

The rivalry began in 1933 with the founding of the Eagles, and slowly strengthened when both teams came to relative prominence in the 1940s and 1950s. The two teams have played in the same division in the NFL every year since 1933, making it the second-oldest rivalry in the NFC East division, behind only New York's rivalry with the Washington Commanders. The ferocity of the rivalry can also be attributed to the geographic New York-Philadelphia rivalry, which is mirrored in Major League Baseball's Mets–Phillies rivalry and the National Hockey League's Flyers–Rangers rivalry. It is ranked by NFL Network as the number one rivalry of all-time and Sports Illustrated ranks it amongst the top ten NFL rivalries of all-time at number four, and according to ESPN, it is one of the fiercest and most well-known rivalries in the football community.

The Eagles lead the overall series, 97–91–2. The two teams have met five times in the playoffs, with the Eagles holding a 3–2 advantage.

== Notable rivalry moments ==
=== The Hit: 1960 ===
In a November 20, 1960, game, the Eagles' Chuck Bednarik cleanly blindsided Giants running back Frank Gifford in a play known as The Hit, widely considered the hardest, or one of the hardest, tackles in the history of the National Football League that sent Gifford to the ground unconscious. He was removed from the field by stretcher, transported to a hospital by ambulance, and diagnosed with a severe concussion. The play forced Gifford out of the game for 18 months before he was ultimately able to return with the Giants.

=== The Miracle at the Meadowlands/The Fumble: 1978 ===
On November 19, 1978, at Giants Stadium, the Giants were leading the Eagles 17–12 with 20 seconds remaining. Offensive coordinator Bob Gibson called for a running play when all that was needed was for the Giants to take a knee having previously got run over while kneeling the very prior play. The handoff between quarterback Joe Pisarcik and Larry Csonka was fumbled and Eagles cornerback Herman Edwards grabbed the loose ball and returned it for the winning score. This play is commonly referred to as The Miracle at the Meadowlands by Eagles fans and just "The Fumble" by Giants fans.

=== 1981 NFC wild card game ===
In 1981, both the Giants and the defending NFC champion Eagles qualified for playoff berths. The Eagles hosted the Giants on December 27 in a wild card game. The Giants, led by quarterback Scott Brunner and head coach Ray Perkins, took a 20–0 lead in the first quarter. The Eagles rallied but never led and the Giants held on to win 27–21. The game ended with Scott Brunner kneeling down on the ball, which was revenge for the Joe Pisarcik game some three years earlier. The Giants would go on to lose 38–24 to the San Francisco 49ers, the eventual Super Bowl XVI champions.

=== 1988 division title ===
The 1988 NFL season saw both teams competing for the NFC East title. On November 20, 1988, the Giants hosted the Eagles with both teams in the running for control over their division. The Eagles, led by head coach Buddy Ryan and quarterback Randall Cunningham, fought a tough match to bring the game into overtime with the score tied at 17–17. In overtime, Eagles defensive lineman Clyde Simmons carried the ball 15 yards after a blocked Eagles field goal attempt for the game-winning touchdown, completing a season sweep of the Giants. This was dubbed the "Forgotten Miracle at the Meadowlands." Both teams finished with 10–6 records, but the Eagles won the NFC East due to their head-to-head victories, while the Giants lost the wild card tiebreaker to the Los Angeles Rams and missed the playoffs. The Eagles would lose to the Chicago Bears in a game famously known as the Fog Bowl.

=== 2000 NFC divisional game ===
On January 7, 2001, the Giants defeated the Eagles 20–10 in a divisional playoff game with the help of Ron Dixon's 97-yard kickoff return and Jason Sehorn's acrobatic 32-yard interception return. This win helped propel the Giants to Super Bowl XXXV, which they lost to the Baltimore Ravens, 34–7.

=== 2006 NFC wild card game ===
On January 7, 2007, the Eagles defeated the Giants 23–20 in a wild card playoff game on a David Akers field goal as time expired. The Eagles had relinquished a ten-point lead in the fourth quarter, with the Giants tying the game on a touchdown by Plaxico Burress with just over five minutes remaining. Jeff Garcia and Brian Westbrook led the game-winning drive deep into Giants territory, allowing the Eagles to drain the clock to three seconds before Akers lined up his 38-yard kick to win the game.

=== 2008 NFC Divisional Game ===
The two teams split their 2008 meetings. The Giants rallied to edge the Eagles in Philadelphia 36–31, then the Eagles stymied New York's offense en route to a 20–14 win at Giants Stadium in East Rutherford, New Jersey. They met again at Giants Stadium on January 11, 2009, in the 2008 NFC Divisional Playoffs. In what would ultimately be the final playoff game at the venue, the #6 seeded Eagles defeated the top-seeded Giants 23–11, leaving the series tied 2–2 in the all-time playoff series.

=== Miracle at the New Meadowlands: 2010 ===
On December 19, 2010, the Giants led the Eagles 31–10 with 7:28 left in the first game between the teams at New Meadowlands Stadium where first place in the NFC East was on the line. But the Eagles rallied to tie the score and then won the game on DeSean Jackson's 65 yard punt return for a touchdown with no time left on the clock for a 38–31 victory. The Elias Sports Bureau noted that this is the first walk-off punt return in NFL history. The Giants missed the playoffs, despite finishing tied for first with the Eagles at 10–6, and the Eagles lost their last two games.

=== Other notable moments ===
- On December 18, 1994, the Giants beat the Eagles at Veterans Stadium, giving them their fifth consecutive win after starting 3–7, while giving the Eagles their sixth consecutive loss of the season after a 7–2 start. This led to the firing of Philadelphia's then-head coach Rich Kotite after the season's conclusion.
- On October 31, 1999, at Veterans Stadium in overtime, Eagles' quarterback (and future head coach) Doug Pederson had his pass blocked up in the air and was intercepted by Michael Strahan and returned for a 44-yard touchdown to win the game for the Giants 23–17.
- In Week 6 of the 2001 season, the Eagles broke a nine-game losing streak against the Giants. James Thrash caught the winning touchdown from Donovan McNabb in the fourth quarter.
- In week 2 of the 2006 season, the Giants met the Eagles in Philadelphia and were down 24–7 by the end of the 3rd quarter. In the 4th quarter of regulation the Giants responded with two more touchdowns and a field goal to tie the game 24–24 and go into overtime. In overtime the Giants defeated the Eagles when quarterback Eli Manning threw a 31-yard pass to Plaxico Burress.
- On September 30, 2007, the Giants sacked Eagles quarterback Donovan McNabb 12 times (tying an NFL record) en route to a 16–3 win. New York's defense held the Eagles scoreless in the first half, while in the second quarter, New York got on the board first with quarterback Eli Manning completing a 9-yard touchdown pass to wide receiver Plaxico Burress. In the third quarter, the Giants increased their lead with kicker Lawrence Tynes getting a 29-yard field goal, along with linebacker Kawika Mitchell returning a fumble 17-yards for a touchdown. In the fourth quarter, the Eagles would get their only points of the game with kicker David Akers making a 53-yard field goal. Later that year, in the 2007 playoffs, New York would go on to defeat the 18–0 unbeaten New England Patriots in Super Bowl XLII.
- On October 12, 2014, the Eagles authored their first shutout win in the series since 1996, winning 27–0. Quarterback Nick Foles threw for 248 yards and two touchdowns while he and three Eagles running backs rushed for 203 yards, led by LeSean McCoy's 149 yards. The Giants failed on a fourth and goal attempt in the third quarter following a Foles interception; even worse, wide receiver Victor Cruz suffered a season-ending injury on the play. (This led to an off-field episode in the rivalry, as the cover of the next morning's New York Daily News showed a cheering Eagles employee and the fallen Cruz under the headline "PHILTHY!", implying that the man was celebrating the injury rather than the result of the play. However, this photo was later debunked as being taken out of context.) Eli Manning was held to 151 yards and backup Ryan Nassib connected for 60 yards.
- On September 24, 2017, in Philadelphia, kicker Jake Elliott kicked a 61-yard field goal to beat the New York Giants with no time on the clock for the final play of the game, resulting in a 27–24 victory. Previously regarded as nothing more than a replacement kicker for injured Caleb Sturgis, the kick earned Elliott NFC Special Teams Player of the Week honors, cementing him as a strong kicking option for the 2017 Eagles. Elliott's kick set an Eagles' franchise record for the longest field goal, tied for the 7th-longest field goal in NFL history, and was the longest since November 2015. Elliott helped the Eagles to their first Super Bowl victory later that season in Super Bowl LII.
- On December 9, 2019, an ankle injury previously suffered by Giants quarterback Daniel Jones would result in Eli Manning returning to the starting lineup against the Eagles. During the game, Manning threw for 203 yards and two touchdowns to rookie wide receiver Darius Slayton, but the game ended in a 23–17 overtime loss for the Giants. Manning retired at the end of the season. As the game against the Eagles was televised on Monday Night Football, it marked Manning's final primetime appearance.
- On January 3, 2021, with the Giants having won earlier in the day, they needed the Eagles, who were eliminated from playoff contention, to defeat the Washington Football Team in order to for the Giants to clinch the NFC East division. The Eagles lost to Washington; Washington rallied from down 14–10 to win 20–14 thus giving them the NFC East title and eliminating the Giants from the playoffs. Eagles head coach Doug Pederson was criticized for benching struggling rookie Jalen Hurts and was questioned in some media circles on how hard his team played. The loss advanced the Eagles three spots in the 2021 NFL Draft to sixth. Giants running back Saquon Barkley would tweet his disbelief at what was happening, to which former Giants quarterback Eli Manning would reply "This is why we don't like the Eagles."
- On March 26, 2021, after it was alleged that the Eagles tanked in their week 17 game to moved up three spots in the draft, the Eagles traded with the Dolphins to move down to the 12th overall pick. While the Eagles gained a 2022 first-round pick from the trade, this made many Giants fans angry since trading back seemingly removed any good reason for the Eagles to have tanked in week 17 in spite of any leverage gained from the higher draft position contributing to the trade being completed. Leading up to the 2021 NFL draft, the Giants were sitting at 11th overall. As the draft went on, it was suspected that the Giants would draft wide receiver and 2020 Heisman Trophy winner DeVonta Smith. However, the Eagles traded in-division with Dallas to move up to the 10th overall pick and drafted Smith, which reportedly made the Giants front office "livid.” The Eagles' trade-up resulted in the Giants trading down to the 20th pick with the Chicago Bears, and they would select Florida wide receiver Kadarius Toney.
- On March 11, 2024, Giants running back Saquon Barkley agreed to a 3-year, $37.75 million contract with the Eagles after a six-year career with the Giants. The entire process was shown during a special offseason edition of HBO Hard Knocks where Giants general manager Joe Schoen had stated to Giants executives on camera that they were not "paying a $40 million quarterback (in reference to Daniel Jones) to hand off to a $12 million running back (in reference to Barkley)". Giants owner John Mara was also recorded saying that he "would have a hard time sleeping if Saquon goes to Philadelphia". Eagles head coach Nick Sirianni would later tell reporters that during that offseason, if heckled badly by Giants fans, he would reply "you know, we got your best player". On October 20, 2024 in his return to MetLife Stadium, amidst a chorus of boos from his former fans, Barkley rushed for 176 yards and a touchdown in a 28–3 Eagles win. Jones was later benched and requested his release on November 22, 2024 which the Giants granted. Barkley ultimately became the 9th running back to join the 2,000-yard club, finishing with 2,005 rushing yards in 16 games, and the Eagles would win Super Bowl LIX that season.

== Season-by-season results ==
Philadelphia Eagles vs. New York Giants Season-by-Season Results
1930s (Giants, 11–3)

Season	Season series	at Philadelphia Eagles	at New York Giants	Overall series	Notes
1933	Giants 2–0	Giants; 20–14	Giants; 56–0	Giants; 2–0	Eagles join the National Football League (NFL) as an expansion team. The Eagles and Giants were placed in the NFL Eastern Division, becoming divisional rivals. Game in New York is the Eagles' inaugural game, and the Giants record their largest victory over the Eagles with a 56–point differential. Giants lose 1933 NFL Championship.
1934	Tie 1–1	Eagles; 6–0	Giants; 17–0	Giants; 3–1	Giants win 1934 NFL Championship.
1935	Giants 2–0	Giants; 21–14	Giants; 10–0	Giants; 5–1	Last matchup at Baker Bowl. Giants lose 1935 NFL Championship.
1936	Tie 1–1	Eagles; 10–7	Giants; 21–17	Giants; 6–2	Eagles move to Philadelphia Municipal Stadium (now known as John F. Kennedy Stadium). Eagles' win in the season opener was their only win, as they ended the 1936 season on an 11-game losing streak. That streak would extend to a 16-game winless streak and a 14-game losing streak.
1937	Giants 2–0	Giants; 16–7	Giants; 21–0	Giants; 8–2	
1938	Tie 1–1	Eagles; 14–10	Giants; 17–7	Giants; 9–3	Giants win 1938 NFL Championship.
1939	Giants 2–0	Giants; 13–3	Giants; 27–10	Giants; 11–3	Giants lose 1939 NFL Championship.

1940s (Eagles, 10–9–1)

Season	Season series	at Philadelphia Eagles	at New York Giants	Overall series	Notes
1940	Giants 2–0	Giants; 20–14	Giants; 17–7	Giants; 13–3	Eagles move to Shibe Park.
1941	Giants 2–0	Giants; 24–0	Giants; 16–0	Giants; 15–3	Giants lose 1941 NFL Championship.
1942	Giants 2–0	Giants; 14–0	Giants; 35–17	Giants; 17–3	Giants win nine straight meetings (1938–1942).
1943	Tie 1–1	"Steagles"; 28–14	Giants; 42–14	Giants; 18–4	Eagles and Pittsburgh Steelers merged for the 1943 season to become the "Steagles," as both teams lost many players to military service during World War II. Giants win 11 straight home meetings (1933–1943).
1944	Eagles 1–0–1	Tie; 21–21	Eagles; 24–17	Giants; 18–5–1	Eagles record their first win at New York and win their first season series over the Giants. Eagles' win and the tie were the only regular season results that weren't wins for the Giants in the 1944 season. Giants lose 1944 NFL Championship.
1945	Tie 1–1	Eagles; 38–17	Giants; 28–21	Giants; 19–6–1	In New York, Giants overcame a 21–0 second half deficit.
1946	Tie 1–1	Eagles; 24–14	Giants; 45–17	Giants; 20–7–1	Giants lose 1946 NFL Championship.
1947	Eagles 2–0	Eagles; 23–0	Eagles; 41–24	Giants; 20–9–1	Eagles record their first season series sweep against the Giants. Eagles lose 1947 NFL Championship.
1948	Eagles 2–0	Eagles; 45–0	Eagles; 35–14	Giants; 20–11–1	In Philadelphia, the Eagles record their largest victory over the Giants with a 45–point differential. Eagles win 1948 NFL Championship.
1949	Eagles 2–0	Eagles; 17–3	Eagles; 24–3	Giants; 20–13–1	Eagles win 1949 NFL Championship.

1950s (Giants, 14–6)

Season	Season series	at Philadelphia Eagles	at New York Giants	Overall series	Notes
1950	Giants 2–0	Giants; 9–7	Giants; 7–3	Giants; 22–13–1	As a result of the AAFC–NFL merger, the Eagles and Giants were placed in the NFL American Conference (later renamed to the NFL Eastern Conference in the 1953 season).
1951	Giants 2–0	Giants; 23–7	Giants; 26–24	Giants; 24–13–1	In New York, Giants overcame a 17–0 second half deficit.
1952	Tie 1–1	Giants; 31–7	Eagles; 14–10	Giants; 25–14–1	
1953	Tie 1–1	Eagles; 30–7	Giants; 37–28	Giants; 26–15–1	
1954	Tie 1–1	Eagles; 29–14	Giants; 27–14	Giants; 27–16–1	
1955	Tie 1–1	Eagles; 27–17	Giants; 31–7	Giants; 28–17–1	Last matchup at Polo Grounds.
1956	Giants 2–0	Giants; 21–7	Giants; 20–3	Giants; 30–17–1	Giants move to Yankee Stadium. Giants win 1956 NFL Championship.
1957	Giants 2–0	Giants; 24–20	Giants; 13–0	Giants; 32–17–1	Last matchup at Connie Mack Stadium (now known as Shibe Park).
1958	Tie 1–1	Eagles; 27–24	Giants; 24–10	Giants; 33–18–1	Eagles move to Franklin Field. Giants lose 1958 NFL Championship.
1959	Tie 1–1	Eagles; 49–21	Giants; 24–7	Giants; 34–19–1	In Philadelphia, the Eagles score their most points in a game against the Giants. Giants lose 1959 NFL Championship.

1960s (Giants, 11–7)

Season	Season series	at Philadelphia Eagles	at New York Giants	Overall series	Notes
1960	Eagles 2–0	Eagles; 31–23	Eagles; 17–10	Giants; 34–21–1	In New York, Eagles' LB Chuck Bednarik's hard hit on Giants' RB Frank Gifford causes a key fumble in the Eagles' win, allowing the Eagles to take the division. This hit became known as "The Hit" and caused Gifford to miss most of the two seasons. In Philadelphia, Eagles overcame a 17–0 deficit. Eagles' first season series sweep against the Giants since the 1949 season. Eagles win 1960 NFL Championship.
1961	Giants 2–0	Giants; 28–24	Giants; 38–21	Giants; 36–21–1	Giants lose 1961 NFL Championship.
1962	Giants 2–0	Giants; 29–13	Giants; 19–14	Giants; 38–21–1	Giants lose 1962 NFL Championship.
1963	Giants 2–0	Giants; 37–14	Giants; 42–14	Giants; 40–21–1	Giants lose 1963 NFL Championship.
1964	Eagles 2–0	Eagles; 38–7	Eagles; 23–17	Giants; 40–23–1	
1965	Giants 2–0	Giants; 16–14	Giants; 35–27	Giants; 42–23–1	
1966	Eagles 2–0	Eagles; 35–17	Eagles; 31–3	Giants; 42–25–1	
1967	Giants 1–0	no game	Giants; 44–7	Giants; 43–25–1	As a result of expansion, the two eight-team divisions became two eight-team conferences split into two divisions. The Eagles are placed in the NFL Capitol Division, while the Giants and New Orleans Saints alternate between the Capitol and NFL Century Divisions each year. This resulted in only a single meeting between the Eagles and Giants in the 1967 and 1969 season.
1968	Giants 2–0	Giants; 34–25	Giants; 7–6	Giants; 45–25–1	
1969	Eagles 1–0	no game	Eagles; 23–20	Giants; 45–26–1	

1970s (Eagles, 15–4–1)

Season	Season series	at Philadelphia Eagles	at New York Giants	Overall series	Notes
1970	Tie 1–1	Eagles; 23–20	Giants; 30–23	Giants; 46–27–1	As a result of the AFL–NFL merger, the Eagles and Giants were placed in the NFC East. Last matchup at Franklin Field. First season series split since the 1959 season.
1971	Eagles 2–0	Eagles; 23–7	Eagles; 41–28	Giants; 46–29–1	Eagles open Veterans Stadium.
1972	Giants 2–0	Giants; 27–12	Giants; 62–10	Giants; 48–29–1	In New York, the Giants set a franchise record for their most points scored in a game, while the Eagles set a franchise record for their most points allowed in a game.
1973	Eagles 1–0–1	Eagles; 20–16	Tie; 23–23	Giants; 48–30–2	Last matchup at Yankee Stadium.
1974	Eagles 2–0	Eagles; 35–7	Eagles; 20–7	Giants; 48–32–2	Due to renovations at Yankee Stadium, the Giants home game was played at Yale Bowl in New Haven, Connecticut.
1975	Tie 1–1	Giants; 23–14	Eagles; 13–10	Giants; 49–33–2	Giants home game was played at Shea Stadium in New York.
1976	Eagles 2–0	Eagles; 20–7	Eagles; 10–0	Giants; 49–35–2	Giants open Giants Stadium in East Rutherford, New Jersey.
1977	Eagles 2–0	Eagles; 17–14	Eagles; 28–10	Giants; 49–37–2	
1978	Eagles 2–0	Eagles; 20–3	Eagles; 19–17	Giants; 49–39–2	In East Rutherford (Giants), Eagles' CB Herman Edwards returns a fumble for a game-winning touchdown in what is dubbed the "Miracle at the Meadowlands". In Philadelphia, Eagles clinch a playoff berth for the first time since the 1960 season with their win.
1979	Eagles 2–0	Eagles; 23–17	Eagles; 17–13	Giants; 49–41–2	

1980s (Giants, 12–9)

Season	Season series	at Philadelphia Eagles	at New York Giants	Overall series	Notes
1980	Eagles 2–0	Eagles; 35–3	Eagles; 31–16	Giants; 49–43–2	Eagles lose Super Bowl XV.
1981	Tie 1–1	Giants; 20–10	Eagles; 24–10	Giants; 50–44–2	Eagles win twelve straight meetings (1975–1981) and win eight straight away meetings (1974–1981).
1981 Playoffs	Giants 1–0	Giants; 27–21	—N/a	Giants; 51–44–2	NFC Wild Card Round.
1982	Giants 2–0	Giants; 26–24	Giants; 23–7	Giants; 53–44–2	Giants' first season series sweep against the Eagles since the 1972 season.
1983	Tie 1–1	Giants; 23–0	Eagles; 17–13	Giants; 54–45–2	
1984	Tie 1–1	Eagles; 24–10	Giants; 28–27	Giants; 55–46–2	
1985	Giants 2–0	Giants; 16–10 (OT)	Giants; 21–0	Giants; 57–46–2	
1986	Giants 2–0	Giants; 17–14	Giants; 35–3	Giants; 59–46–2	Giants win Super Bowl XXI.
1987	Giants 2–0	Giants; 20–17	Giants; 23–20 (OT)	Giants; 61–46–2	
1988	Eagles 2–0	Eagles; 24–13	Eagles; 23–17 (OT)	Giants; 61–48–2	Both teams finish with 10–6 records, but the Eagles clinch the NFC East based on their head-to-head sweep.
1989	Eagles 2–0	Eagles; 21–19	Eagles; 24–17	Giants; 61–50–2	

1990s (Giants, 11–9)

Season	Season series	at Philadelphia Eagles	at New York Giants	Overall series	Notes
1990	Tie 1–1	Eagles; 31–13	Giants; 27–20	Giants; 62–51–2	Eagles' win ended the Giants' 13-game winning streak in the regular season and handed them their first loss of the season after a 10–0 start. Giants win Super Bowl XXV.
1991	Eagles 2–0	Eagles; 30–7	Eagles; 19–14	Giants; 62–53–2	In New York, the Eagles eliminate the defending Super Bowl champions Giants from playoff contention with their win.
1992	Eagles 2–0	Eagles; 20–10	Eagles; 47–34	Giants; 62–55–2	
1993	Giants 2–0	Giants; 7–3	Giants; 21–10	Giants; 64–55–2	
1994	Giants 2–0	Giants; 16–13	Giants; 28–23	Giants; 66–55–2	
1995	Eagles 2–0	Eagles; 28–19	Eagles; 17–14	Giants; 66–57–2	
1996	Eagles 2–0	Eagles; 24–0	Eagles; 19–10	Giants; 66–59–2	
1997	Giants 2–0	Giants; 31–21	Giants; 31–17	Giants; 68–59–2	
1998	Giants 2–0	Giants; 20–10	Giants; 20–0	Giants; 70–59–2	
1999	Giants 2–0	Giants; 23–17 (OT)	Giants; 16–15	Giants; 72–59–2	In Philadelphia, Giants overcame a 17–3 fourth quarter deficit and Giants' DE Michael Strahan scores the game-winning touchdown on a pick-six in overtime.

2000s (Eagles, 13–10)

Season	Season series	at Philadelphia Eagles	at New York Giants	Overall series	Notes
2000	Giants 2–0	Giants; 33–18	Giants; 24–7	Giants; 74–59–2	Giants lose Super Bowl XXXV.
2000 Playoffs	Giants 1–0	—N/a	Giants; 20–10	Giants; 75–59–2	NFC Divisional Round. Giants win 9 straight meetings (1997–2001). Giants go on to lose Super Bowl XXXV.
2001	Eagles 2–0	Eagles; 24–21	Eagles; 10–9	Giants; 75–61–2	In Philadelphia, the Giants' "86 Lamburth Special" lateral play falls 6 yards short of the end zone, clinching the Eagles their first NFC East title since the 1988 season and eliminating the Giants from playoff contention.
2002	Tie 1–1	Eagles; 17–3	Giants; 10–7 (OT)	Giants; 76–62–2	Last matchup at Veterans Stadium. Both teams split the season series for the first time since the 1990 season. Giants clinch a playoff berth with their win.
2003	Eagles 2–0	Eagles; 28–10	Eagles; 14–10	Giants; 76–64–2	Eagles open Lincoln Financial Field. In New York, Eagles' RB Brian Westbrook returned an 84-yard punt return for a game-winning touchdown in the final minutes. The Eagles would go on a nine-game winning streak starting with this win.
2004	Eagles 2–0	Eagles; 31–17	Eagles; 27–6	Giants; 76–66–2	Eagles lose Super Bowl XXXIX.
2005	Giants 2–0	Giants; 26–23 (OT)	Giants; 27–17	Giants; 78–66–2	
2006	Tie 1–1	Giants; 30–24 (OT)	Eagles; 36–22	Giants; 79–67–2	In Philadelphia, Giants overcame a 24–7 fourth quarter deficit.
2006 Playoffs	Eagles 1–0	Eagles; 23–20	—N/a	Giants; 79–68–2	NFC Wild Card Round. Eagles K David Akers kicks the game-winning field goal as time expired after the Giants' rallied from a 20–10 deficit.
2007	Giants 2–0	Giants; 16–13	Giants; 16–3	Giants; 81–68–2	This remains the last time the Giants have swept the Eagles. Giants win Super Bowl XLII.
2008	Tie 1–1	Giants; 36–31	Eagles; 20–14	Giants; 82–69–2	
2008 Playoffs	Eagles 1–0	—N/a	Eagles; 23–11	Giants; 82–70–2	NFC Divisional Round. Eagles become the first #6 seed in the NFC to defeat the best-ranked team in the NFC in the last playoff game played at Giants Stadium.
2009	Eagles 2–0	Eagles; 40–17	Eagles; 45–38	Giants; 82–72–2	Last matchup at Giants Stadium. The Game in East Rutherford is the highest-scoring game in the rivalry (83 points).

2010s (Eagles, 16–4)

Season	Season series	at Philadelphia Eagles	at New York Giants	Overall series	Notes
2010	Eagles 2–0	Eagles; 27–17	Eagles; 38–31	Giants; 82–74–2	Giants open New Meadowlands Stadium (now known as MetLife Stadium). In their first matchup at New Meadowlands Stadium, Eagles overcame a 31–10 fourth quarter deficit. On the game's final play, Eagles' WR DeSean Jackson returned a 65-yard punt return for the game-winning touchdown in a moment that has come to be known as the "Miracle at the New Meadowlands". Both teams finish with 10–6 records, but the Eagles clinched the NFC East based on their head-to-head sweep.
2011	Tie 1–1	Giants; 29–16	Eagles; 17–10	Giants; 83–75–2	Giants win Super Bowl XLVI.
2012	Tie 1–1	Eagles; 19–17	Giants; 42–7	Giants; 84–76–2	Game in New York was Andy Reid's last game as Eagles' head coach.
2013	Tie 1–1	Giants; 15–7	Eagles; 36–21	Giants; 85–77–2	
2014	Eagles 2–0	Eagles; 27–0	Eagles; 34–26	Giants; 85–79–2	
2015	Eagles 2–0	Eagles; 27–7	Eagles; 35–30	Giants; 85–81–2	Game in New York was Tom Coughlin's last game as Giants' head coach.
2016	Tie 1–1	Eagles; 24–19	Giants; 28–23	Giants; 86–82–2	
2017	Eagles 2–0	Eagles; 27–24	Eagles; 34–29	Giants; 86–84–2	In Philadelphia, Eagles' K Jake Elliott kicks a game-winning 61-yard field goal, setting a franchise record for their longest field goal made. Eagles win Super Bowl LII.
2018	Eagles 2–0	Eagles; 25–22	Eagles; 34–13	Tie; 86–86–2	In Philadelphia, Eagles overcame a 19–3 deficit.
2019	Eagles 2–0	Eagles; 23–17 (OT)	Eagles; 34–17	Eagles; 88–86–2	Eagles take the overall series lead against the Giants for the first time. In New York, Eagles clinched the NFC East with their win. Final season for Giants' QB Eli Manning.

2020s (Eagles, 9–5)

Season	Season series	at Philadelphia Eagles	at New York Giants	Overall series	Notes
2020	Tie 1–1	Eagles; 22–21	Giants; 27–17	Eagles; 89–87–2	Eagles won eight straight meetings (2016–2020).
2021	Tie 1–1	Eagles; 34–10	Giants; 13–7	Eagles; 90–88–2	
2022	Eagles 2–0	Eagles; 22–16	Eagles; 48–22	Eagles; 92–88–2	In New York, the Eagles clinch a playoff berth with their win. In Philadelphia, the Eagles clinch the NFC East and the #1 seed with their win.
2022 Playoffs	Eagles 1–0	Eagles; 38–7	—N/a	Eagles; 93–88–2	NFC Divisional Round. Eagles lose Super Bowl LVII.
2023	Tie 1–1	Eagles; 33–25	Giants; 27–10	Eagles; 94–89–2	Game in Philadelphia was played on Christmas.
2024	Eagles 2–0	Eagles; 20–13	Eagles; 28–3	Eagles; 96–89–2	Eagles sign Giants' RB Saquon Barkley. Eagles win Super Bowl LIX.
2025	Tie 1–1	Eagles; 38–20	Giants; 34–17	Eagles; 97–90–2	Eagles win 13 straight home games (2014–2025).
2026	Giants 1–0	Giants; 19–11	January 9/10	Eagles; 97–91–2	Giants win in Philadelphia for the first time since 2013.

Summary of Results

Season	Season series	at Philadelphia Eagles	at New York Giants	Notes
Regular season	Eagles 94–89–2	Eagles 55–37–1	Giants 52–39–1	Eagles are 1–0 at Yale Bowl in New Haven, Connecticut (1974), accounted for as a Giants home game.
Postseason	Eagles 3–2	Eagles 2–1	Tie 1–1	NFC Wild Card: 1981, 2006; NFC Divisional: 2000, 2008, 2022
Regular and postseason	Eagles 97–91–2	Eagles 57–37–1	Giants 53–40–1	

== Players who have played for both teams ==
Name	Position(s)	Tenure with Eagles	Tenure with Giants
Norm Snead	Quarterback	1964–1970	1971–1974
Joe Pisarcik	Quarterback	1980–1984	1977–1979
Saquon Barkley	Running back	2024–present	2018–2023
Jeff Feagles	Punter	1990–1993	2003–2009
Dominique Rodgers-Cromartie	Cornerback	2011–2012	2014–2017
Mike Horan	Punter	1984–1985	1993–1996
Mark Bavaro	Tight end	1993–1994	1985–1990
Mark Ingram Sr.	Wide receiver	1996	1987–1992
Tyree Jackson	Tight end	2021–2022	2023
Parris Campbell	Wide receiver	2024	2023
Steve Smith	Wide receiver	2011	2007–2010

== Rivalry outside football ==
- The 2006 film Invincible follows Vince Papale (Mark Wahlberg) and his rise to playing for the Eagles. He crushes on a coworker, who, being from New York, is a Giants fan, and in his breakout game, the Eagles play the Giants when he recovers a muffed punt for a touchdown.
- The 2009 film Big Fan depicts a Giants fan (Patton Oswalt) and his bitter rivalry with an Eagles fan (Michael Rapaport).
- After winning the NFC championship on January 29, 2023, the Empire State Building lit up to celebrate the Eagles making the Super Bowl. This sparked outrage from many people in New York, including mayor Eric Adams.

== See also ==
- List of NFL rivalries
- NFC East
- Mets–Phillies rivalry
- Flyers–Rangers rivalry
- Flyers–Islanders rivalry
- Devils–Flyers rivalry
