= Lou Nolan =

American hockey announcer

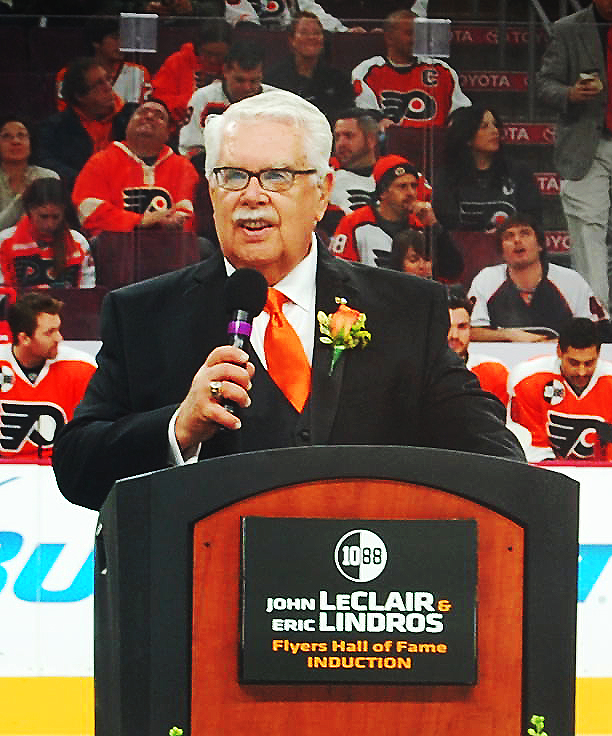
- Nolan in November 2014
- Born: December 3, 1945 (age 80); Philadelphia, Pennsylvania
- Years active: 1972–present
- Known for: Public address announcer for the Philadelphia Flyers
- Spouse: Ellen Nolan

Louis James Nolan (born December 3, 1945) is the public address announcer for the Philadelphia Flyers of the National Hockey League. He has worked in this position since the 1972–73 NHL season, when he replaced former announcer Kevin Johnson. He has been on the PA for 8 Stanley Cup Finals, two NHL All-Star Games, the 2014 NCAA Frozen Four, and the 2014 NHL entry draft. When the 2004–05 season was cancelled because of a lockout, he was able to continue his duties with the Flyers AHL affiliate, the Philadelphia Phantoms.

Nolan was a venue announcer at the 2002 Winter Olympics.

He attended St. Barnabas School and West Catholic High School in Philadelphia. He is married to Ellen and has two children. He resides in Penn Valley, Pennsylvania.

Nolan's book "If These Walls Could Talk: Philadelphia Flyers" (Triumph Books) was released in November 2017.
