= 2012 NHL Winter Classic =

Outdoor National Hockey League game in Philadelphia, Pennsylvania

	1	2	3	Total
New York Rangers	0	1	2	3
Philadelphia Flyers	0	2	0	2
- Date: January 2, 2012
- Venue: Citizens Bank Park
- City: Philadelphia
- Attendance: 46,967

The 2012 NHL Winter Classic (known via corporate sponsorship as the Bridgestone NHL Winter Classic) was an outdoor ice hockey game played in the National Hockey League (NHL) on January 2, 2012, at Citizens Bank Park in Philadelphia. The fifth edition of the Winter Classic, it matched the New York Rangers against the Philadelphia Flyers, two Atlantic Division rivals; the Rangers won by a score of 3–2. The original plan was to have the contest at the Philadelphia Eagles' home, Lincoln Financial Field; however, the Eagles played there the day before, and the NHL needed at least a week of preparation time to build the ice rink onto the field. The game was broadcast by NBC in the United States and by CBC and RDS in Canada. NBC's announcers were Mike Emrick and Eddie Olczyk, with Pierre McGuire handling sideline duties and Bob Costas as the studio host.

The game returned to its original daytime time slot, with the Rangers-Flyers game beginning at 3:00 p.m. Eastern Standard Time (two hours behind its originally scheduled start time of 1:00 p.m.). This marked the first time the Winter Classic was not played on New Year's Day; to follow the precedent of bowl games—which do not play on January 1 if it falls on a Sunday out of respect for the National Football League, and the observed New Year's Day holiday being legally floated to Monday in these scenarios, the game was instead played on January 2.

== Game summary ==
Jan 2, 2012	New York Rangers	3–2	Philadelphia Flyers	Citizens Bank Park	Recap

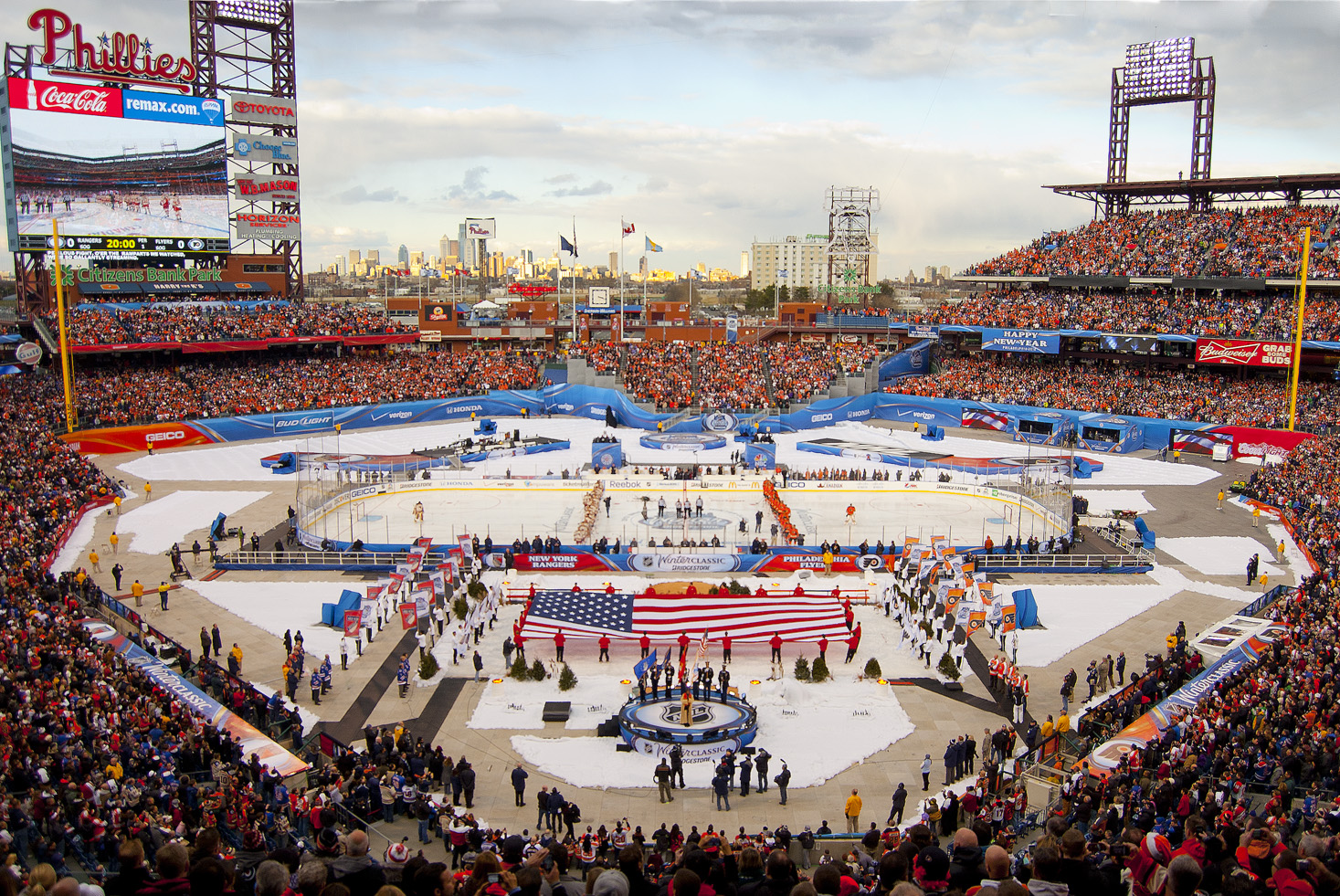
The opening ceremony of the 2012 NHL Winter Classic at Citizens Bank Park, Philadelphia, PA.

The game was delayed two hours from its originally scheduled start time due to the expectations of warm temperatures and sun glare. The 3:20 p.m. puck drop provided more ideal conditions, with a temperature around 45 °F (7 °C) and overcast skies. Rain fell for a short time during the second period. Ice conditions were mostly excellent with few delays to repair the playing surface, and they compared favorably to last year's game according to Michael Rupp, who played for the Penguins in the 2011 NHL Winter Classic. The Rangers entered the game on top of the Atlantic Division and the Eastern Conference with 50 points, with the Flyers trailing the Rangers by two points and having the chance to tie for first place with a win.

The first period was scoreless, with neither team sustaining much offensive pressure. The Flyers had the edge in play, and it was reflected on the scoreboard with their 12–9 lead in shots on goal. Each team was assessed a penalty late in period, resulting in short power plays for both. In the second, shadows were becoming prevalent on the rink as the sun set behind the stadium and the lights took full effect. Despite the ice conditions getting slightly worse, as well, the game became more fast-paced, and the Flyers scored two goals in less than two minutes in the second half of the period. Brayden Schenn's first career goal was scored following an offensive-zone face-off and Claude Giroux scored on an odd-man rush. On the Rangers' first shift following Giroux's goal, Rupp scored his second of the season on a wrist shot. The Flyers again outplayed the Rangers in this period and had a 14 to 8 edge in shots on goal.

The Rangers came out with more energy to start the third, and Rupp tied the game on his first shift of the period, beating Sergei Bobrovsky from a bad angle. Less than three minutes later, Brad Richards gave the Rangers a 3–2 lead when he hit an open side of the net following a rebound. The final period had the most end-to-end action of the game and sustained pressure, and it was played evenly by both teams. The Flyers had the only power play of the period, recording one shot. With Bobrovsky pulled from the net for an extra attacker, the Flyers and Rangers were assessed matching minors, so the Flyers had more room to skate with a five to four skater advantage rather than six to five. As they sustained more pressure and the puck was sliding through the crease, Rangers defenseman Ryan McDonagh slid in an attempt to block the net but was called for covering the puck in the crease. Daniel Briere was chosen to take the ensuing penalty shot, which was stopped by Henrik Lundqvist with 19.6 seconds remaining, sealing the win for the Rangers. With the loss the Flyers became the first team to lose in two Winter Classics. Prior to this game, the Flyers had a record of 18–0–1 when leading after two periods. The win moved the Rangers into first overall in the league standings.

Scoring summary
Period	Team	Goal	Assist(s)	Time	Score
1st	None				
2nd	PHI	Brayden Schenn (1)	Matt Carle (17)	12:26	1–0 PHI
2nd	PHI	Claude Giroux (18)	Maxime Talbot (7) and Scott Hartnell (18)	14:21	2–0 PHI
2nd	NYR	Mike Rupp (2)	Brandon Prust (7) and John Mitchell (6)	14:51	2–1 PHI
3rd	NYR	Mike Rupp (3)	Brandon Prust (8) and John Mitchell (7)	02:41	2–2
3rd	NYR	Brad Richards (14)	Brandon Dubinsky (15), Ryan Callahan (16)	05:21	3–2 NYR

Number in parentheses represents the player's total in goals or assists to that point of the season

Penalty summary
Period	Team	Player	Penalty	Time	PIM
1st	PHI	Matt Carle	Slashing	16:58	2:00
1st	NYR	Brad Richards	Tripping	17:47	2:00
2nd	None				
3rd	NYR	Ryan McDonagh	Delay of game	14:48	2:00
3rd	PHI	Kimmo Timonen	Interference	18:54	2:00
3rd	NYR	Ryan Callahan	Holding the stick	18:54	2:00
3rd	NYR	Ryan McDonagh	Covering puck in crease	19:40	Penalty Shot
3rd	PHI	Scott Hartnell	Cross-checking	20:00	2:00
3rd	PHI	Scott Hartnell	Misconduct	20:00	10:00

Shots by period
Team	1	2	3	Total
NY Rangers	9	8	16	33
Philadelphia	12	14	10	36

Power play opportunities
Team	Goals/Opportunities
New York Rangers	0/1
Philadelphia	0/2

Three star selections
	Team	Player	Statistics
1st	NYR	Mike Rupp	2 Goals
2nd	NYR	Henrik Lundqvist	34 Saves
3rd	PHI	Claude Giroux	1 Goal

== Team rosters ==
New York Rangers
#		Player	Position
4	(Canada)	Michael Del Zotto	D
5	(Canada)	Daniel Girardi	D
8	(Canada)	Brandon Prust	LW
10	(Slovakia)	Marian Gaborik	RW
17	(United States)	Brandon Dubinsky	LW
18	(Canada)	Marc Staal (A)	D
19	(Canada)	Brad Richards (A)	RW
21	(United States)	Derek Stepan	LW
22	(United States)	Brian Boyle	C
24	(United States)	Ryan Callahan (C)	RW
26	(Ukraine)	Ruslan Fedotenko	LW
27	(United States)	Ryan McDonagh	D
30	(Sweden)	Henrik Lundqvist	G
32	(Sweden)	Anton Stralman	D
34	(Canada)	John Mitchell	RW
41	(United States)	Stu Bickel	D
42	(Russia)	Artem Anisimov	C
43	(Canada)	Martin Biron	G
62	(Sweden)	Carl Hagelin	C
71	(United States)	Michael Rupp	C
Head coach: (United States) John Tortorella

Philadelphia Flyers
#		Player	Position
5	(Canada)	Braydon Coburn	D
6	(Sweden)	Andreas Lilja	D
10	(Canada)	Brayden Schenn	C
14	(Canada)	Sean Couturier	C
17	(Canada)	Wayne Simmonds	RW
19	(Canada)	Scott Hartnell	LW
21	(United States)	James van Riemsdyk	LW
24	(Canada)	Matt Read	LW
25	(United States)	Matt Carle	D
27	(Canada)	Maxime Talbot	RW
28	(Canada)	Claude Giroux (A)	C
29	(Canada)	Harry Zolnierczyk	RW
30	(Russia)	Ilya Bryzgalov	G
35	(Russia)	Sergei Bobrovsky	G
41	(Slovakia)	Andrej Meszaros	D
43	(Canada)	Marc-Andre Bourdon	D
44	(Finland)	Kimmo Timonen (A)	D
48	(Canada)	Daniel Briere (A)	C
68	(Czech Republic)	Jaromir Jagr	RW
93	(Czech Republic)	Jakub Voracek	LW
Head coach: (United States) Peter Laviolette

Martin Biron and Ilya Bryzgalov dressed as the back-up goaltenders. Neither entered the game.

=== Scratches ===
- New York Rangers: Jeff Woywitka, Erik Christensen
- Philadelphia Flyers: Matt Walker, Zac Rinaldo, Jody Shelley

=== Officials ===
- Referees — Ian Walsh, Dennis LaRue
- Linesmen — Jean Morin, Pierre Racicot

== Broadcasting ==
The game was telecasted on NBC in the United States, CBC (English) and RDS (French) in Canada.

== Documentary ==
HBO aired a four-part documentary chronicling the preparation of the two teams for the game as part of its award-winning sports series 24/7. The first episode aired on Wednesday, December 14, 2011, at 10 p.m. ET, with three additional episodes following each subsequent Wednesday. The series chronicled each team's seasons leading up to the Winter Classic, and emphasized the physical nature and intensity of the Rangers–Flyers rivalry. The episodes focused notably on the fiery coaching approaches of John Tortorella and Peter Laviolette, the odd and comical personality of Ilya Bryzgalov, and the ups and downs that each team underwent before the Winter Classic.

== Ratings ==
The 2012 Winter Classic had relatively low ratings compared to the previous four events. The game earned a 2.4 rating and 3.74 million viewers; it is the first Winter Classic to fall short of the benchmark set by Wayne Gretzky's final game in 1999 (2.5 rating/6 share) that had stood as the most-watched post-1975 NHL regular season game prior to the Winter Classic. In Philadelphia, the game had a rating of 11.9. The other highest rated markets were Buffalo (7.8), Boston (5.1), and Pittsburgh (4.4). New York's home market finished with a 4.3 rating, the first time that the host markets did not finish both first and second in the individual market ratings.

== Alumni game ==
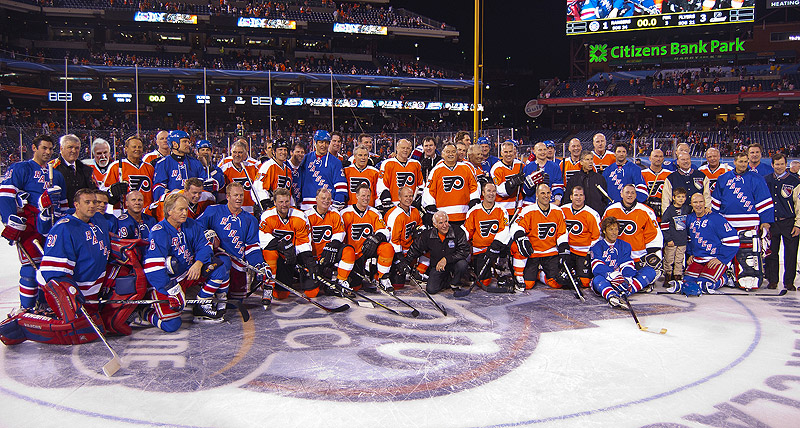
The Flyers and Rangers alumni gathered for a combined team picture after the game.

An alumni game between former Flyers and Rangers players was played on December 31. The game was broadcast live by Versus, CBC Television, and Comcast SportsNet Philadelphia, with a tape-delay broadcast on MSG Network. The start time was rescheduled to 3:00 PM Eastern Standard Time from the original start time of 1:00 PM, due to weather concerns, but garnered a near sellout crowd nonetheless.

Two storylines built headlines in anticipation of alumni game. One was Bernie Parent participating in the game at the age of 66. Parent decided to participate despite his age due to requests by fans. The return of Eric Lindros also grabbed headlines. Lindros was a very popular and successful player for the Flyers, but left the franchise amidst controversy and bad blood. The Flyers players all wore a small number "10" on top of their shoulders in memory of former Flyers defenseman Brad McCrimmon, who died in the 2011 Lokomotiv Yaroslavl plane crash earlier in the year.

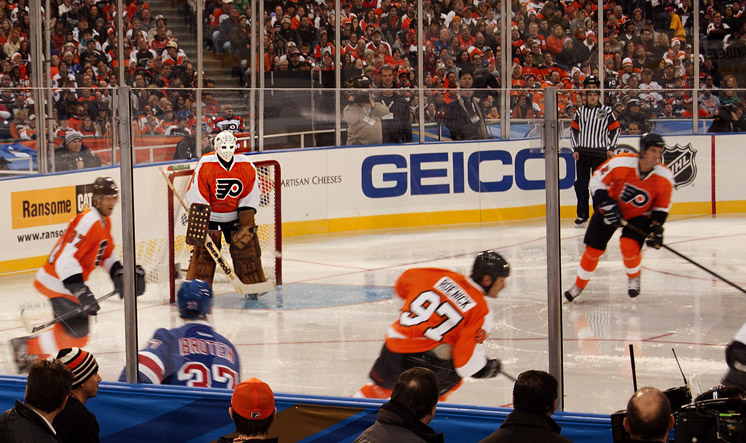
Bernie Parent's return to the ice after 33 years for the 2012 Winter Classic Alumni Game.

The game began with a ceremonial faceoff between Flyer captain Bob Clarke and Ranger captain Mark Messier, dropped by Flyers chairman Ed Snider, member of the Hockey Hall of Fame as a builder, and a recent inductee in the United States Hockey Hall of Fame. The game started with a total of seven members of the Hockey Hall of Fame on the ice: Clarke, Parent, Messier, Bill Barber, Mark Howe, Mike Gartner and Brian Leetch. Glenn Anderson, another Hall of Fame Member, also participated in the game. Parent started the game and earned ovations by several saves, most notably one on a breakaway by Ron Duguay, but was replaced with Mark LaForest by his request five minutes into the game. Early in the game, Jeremy Roenick committed a rare alumni game hit on Darren Turcotte.

The first goal of the game was scored by John LeClair on a pass by Eric Lindros, showing shades of the Legion of Doom. Mikael Renberg, the third member of the Legion, was invited to the game but was unable to participate due to prior commitments. Instead, Lindros and LeClair were joined by Mark Recchi, who retired less than six months earlier after winning the Stanley Cup with the Boston Bruins at the age of 43. Recchi played with Lindros early in Lindros' career, forming the Crazy 8s line with Brent Fedyk before being traded for LeClair and Eric Desjardins, who also participated in the game. Shortly after Lindros scored, Shjon Podein cleaned up a rebound to put the Flyers up 2–0. The first penalty was committed by Eric Lindros, resulting in a penalty shot (as did all penalties in the game) for Nick Kypreos. Kypreos' attempt was however stopped by LaForest.

Rangers goaltender John Vanbiesbrouck was replaced by Dan Blackburn to start the second period. Blackburn would keep the net clean for the entire period, also stopping a penalty shot by Podein after Podein was slashed by Nick Fotiu. Flyers goalie LaForest was replaced by Neil Little halfway through the game without surrendering a goal. Little gave up a goal to a deflection by Glenn Anderson late in the second period, cutting the Flyers lead to 2–1. The goal was originally credited to Brian Leetch before being changed. After the first five minutes in the third period, recent Hall of Fame inductee Mark Howe extended the lead to 3-1 by converting a penalty shot against Blackburn. Neil Little stopped another penalty shot by Glenn Anderson after Anderson was slashed by Bob Clarke. With both goaltenders shutting the door for the rest of the game, the game ended in a 3–1 Flyers win. Following the game, the two teams took part in a traditional handshake line. Afterwards, team photographs were taken, one of each team individually, and one with both teams together.

The game was officiated by retired NHL referee Kerry Fraser and his son, AHL referee Ryan Fraser. Former NHL referee Harry Dumas, who is also Kerry Fraser's son-in-law, with retired NHL linesmen Kevin Collins, who was NHL Supervisor of Officials, served as linesmen for the game. Bernie Parent had a special mask painted for the occasion to be auctioned off for charity, but in the game wore the familiar plain white shell mask with two Flyer logos that was his trademark during most of his playing career. The alumni teams were coached by Pat Quinn (Flyers) and Mike Keenan (Rangers) who had also faced each other in the 1994 Stanley Cup Final won by Keenan's Rangers over Quinn's Vancouver Canucks in seven games (Collins was one of the linesmen in the game the Rangers clinched the Stanley Cup title). Both had also previously coached the Flyers to three appearances in Stanley Cup Finals in 1980 (Quinn), 1985, and 1987 (both Keenan).

New York Rangers
Coaches: Mike Keenan, Emile Francis, Colin Campbell and Mike Richter
Ambassadors: Rod Gilbert, Eddie Giacomin, Vic Hadfield, and Harry Howell

#		Player	Position
36	(Canada)	Glenn Anderson	RW
31	(Canada)	Dan Blackburn	G
37	(United States)	Paul Broten	RW
10	(Canada)	Ron Duguay	C
22	(United States)	Nick Fotiu	LW
22	(Canada)	Mike Gartner	RW
9	(Canada)	Adam Graves	LW
4	(Canada)	Ron Greschner	D
6	(Russia)	Darius Kasparaitis	D
19	(Canada)	Kris King	LW
19	(Canada)	Nick Kypreos	LW
2	(Canada)	Tom Laidlaw	D
15	(Canada)	Darren Langdon	LW
2	(United States)	Brian Leetch	D
26	(Canada)	Dave Maloney	LW
32	(Canada)	Stephane Matteau	LW
11	(Canada)	Mark Messier	C
19	(United States)	Brian Mullen	RW
21	(United States)	Mathieu Schneider	D
8	(United States)	Darren Turcotte	C
34	(United States)	John Vanbiesbrouck	G

Philadelphia Flyers
Coaches: Pat Quinn, Mike Nykoluk, Terry Crisp and Keith Primeau.
Ambassadors: Gary Dornhoefer, Ron Hextall, Don Saleski and Dave Schultz.

#		Player	Position
7	(Canada)	Bill Barber	LW
29	(Canada)	Terry Carkner	D
16	(Canada)	Bobby Clarke	C
37	(Canada)	Eric Desjardins	D
34	(United States)	Jim Dowd	C
5	(Canada)	Larry Goodenough	D
2	(United States)	Derian Hatcher	D
15	(Canada)	Al Hill	C
2	(Canada)	Mark Howe	D
9	(Canada)	Bob Kelly	LW
26	(Canada)	Orest Kindrachuk	C
33	(Canada)	Mark LaForest	G
10	(United States)	John LeClair	RW
27	(Canada)	Reggie Leach	LW
88	(Canada)	Eric Lindros	C
13	(Canada)	Ken Linseman	C
35	(Canada)	Neil Little	G
8	(Canada)	Brad Marsh	D
1	(Canada)	Bernie Parent	G
25	(United States)	Shjon Podein	LW
20	(Canada)	Dave Poulin	C
26	(Canada)	Brian Propp	LW
8	(Canada)	Mark Recchi	RW
97	(United States)	Jeremy Roenick	C
28	(Sweden)	Kjell Samuelsson	D
6	(Canada)	Chris Therien	D
22	(Canada)	Rick Tocchet	RW
20	(Canada)	Jim Watson	D
14	(Canada)	Joe Watson	D

== Associated events ==
As the final event of the Winter Classic, the American Hockey League (AHL) played an outdoor game at Citizens Bank Park on January 6 featuring the Adirondack Phantoms, the Flyers' AHL affiliate which was formerly based in Philadelphia, and the Hershey Bears. The game, which drew an all time AHL record crowd of 45,653, was won by the Phantoms, 4–3, in overtime.

On December 30, 2011, the Philadelphia Police Department Ice Hockey Club hosted the Boston Police Emerald Society in a rematch from their January 6, 2010, game at Fenway Park.

=== Collegiate Games ===
On January 4, 2012, Neumann University Knights (Division III) and Penn State met during the Icers' final year as an ACHA D1 program, prior to moving to the NCAA. Neumann won 6–3 in front of a crowd of 6,800. A second game was held on Thursday, January 5 between ACHA Division I rivals, Drexel University and Villanova University. Drexel won the game 7–3.

== Anthems/Entertainment ==
The anthems were performed by Melanie Fiona (O Canada) and Philadelphia native Patti LaBelle (The Star-Spangled Banner)

During the first intermission the Flyers' anthem singer Lauren Hart performed God Bless America (and also at the Alumni Game)

During intermission, Philadelphia-based hip-hop band The Roots performed "The Fire", but replaced the word "Flyers" instead of "Fire" just for the occasion of supporting the team during the game.

== See also ==
- 2011–12 New York Rangers season
- 2011–12 Philadelphia Flyers season
- AHL Outdoor Classic
- List of outdoor ice hockey games
- List of ice hockey games with highest attendance
