= Mets–Yankees rivalry =

Major League Baseball rivalry in New York City

- New York Mets New York Yankees
- Location: New York City
- First meeting: June 16, 1997; Yankee Stadium (I); Mets 6, Yankees 0
- Latest meeting: September 13, 2026; Yankee Stadium, Bronx; Yankees 2, Mets 0
- Next meeting: May 28, 2027; Citi Field, Queens
- Stadiums: Mets: Citi Field; Yankees: Yankee Stadium

Statistics
- Total meetings: 163
- All-time series: Yankees, 90–73 (.552)
- Regular season series: Yankees, 86–72 (.544)
- Postseason results: Yankees, 4–1 (.800)
- Largest victory: Mets, 12–2 (June 9, 2000; June 26, 2024; September 12, 2026); Yankees, 15–0 (June 14, 2009)
- Longest win streak: Mets, 6 (May 27, 2013–May 13, 2014); Yankees, 7 (June 30, 2002–June 29, 2003)
- Current win streak: Yankees, 1

Post-season history
- 2000 World Series: Yankees won, 4–1

Locations of New York Mets and New York Yankees

The Mets–Yankees rivalry is the interleague rivalry between New York City's Major League Baseball (MLB) teams: the New York Mets and the New York Yankees. The Mets are a member club of MLB's National League (NL) East division, and the Yankees are a member club of MLB's American League (AL) East division. It is the latest in the Subway Series of rivalries between New York-based teams.

Until interleague play started, the two teams had only met in exhibition games. Since the inception of interleague play, the two teams have played each other in every regular season since 1997. From 1999 through 2012, they have played six games per season: two three-game series (one series in each team's ballpark). In 2013–2022, the two teams met six games a season; when the AL East and NL East faced each other and four games (two at each park) the other years. In 2023, all MLB teams started facing each other; they played four games each in 2023 and 2024 and played six games in 2025. Both clubs have qualified for the postseason in the same season on six occasions: 1999, 2000, 2006, 2015, 2022, and 2024; the two teams faced off in the 2000 World Series. Analysts of the game have commented that the rivalry is the best reason for interleague play.

== 1962–96: Formation of the Mets, Mayor's Trophy and pre-interleague era ==
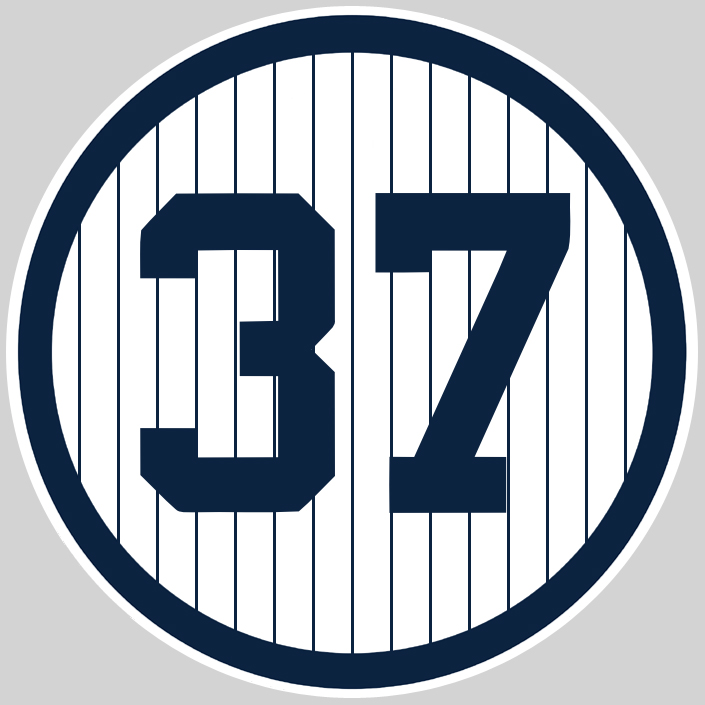
Casey Stengel's number 37 was retired by the New York Yankees in 1970.

Casey Stengel's number 37 was retired by the New York Mets in 1965.

=== Background and formation of Mets ===
The Mets–Yankees rivalry has its origins in the histories of the Brooklyn Dodgers, New York Giants, and Yankees, the three Major League Baseball teams of New York City from 1903 to 1957. For most of that time, the Giants played in Manhattan, the Dodgers in Brooklyn, and the Yankees in the Bronx.

Throughout their time in New York, the three teams chronicled a fierce intra-city rivalry. The Dodgers–Giants rivalry was formed by both teams' competition for dominance in the National League, exemplified by Bobby Thomson's Shot Heard 'Round the World in the 1951 National League tie-breaker series. The Yankees, as the city's only American League team, would form the Giants–Yankees rivalry and Dodgers–Yankees rivalry around their multiple Subway Series competitions with the two teams, where the Yankees would compile a 10–3 record in the thirteen all-New York World Series.

However, in 1958, both of New York's National League teams moved to California, the Giants to San Francisco to become the San Francisco Giants, and the Dodgers to Los Angeles to become the Los Angeles Dodgers. The Yankees were New York City's only Major League Baseball team until from 1958–1962, when the expansion Mets joined the National League. The Mets sought to create a fan base from fans of the departed National League teams, and adopted the Giants' NY insignia in the Giant color of orange set against a cap of Dodger blue, colors that also adorn the New York City flag and coat of arms. The Mets played their first two seasons in the Giants' old stadium, the Polo Grounds, before moving into Shea Stadium in the borough of Queens.

=== Mayor's Trophy ===
Before the creation of interleague play, teams from the National League never played teams from the American League in official games except during the World Series. The teams occasionally met in spring training exhibition games and played 19 times in the Mayor's Trophy Game, an in-season exhibition game, every year from 1963 through 1979, and then again in 1982 and 1983; the Yankees posted a record of 10–8–1 over the Mets in the Mayor's Trophy contests.

The Mayor's Trophy games were played primarily to benefit sandlot baseball in the city, with proceeds going to the city's Amateur Baseball Federation. After dwindling interest and public bickering between the owners of both teams, the Mayor's Trophy Game was discontinued following the 1983 season. It was revived again as a pre-Opening Day series titled the "Mayor's Challenge" and held in 1989.

Mayor's Trophy Game
Season	Date	Location	Visiting team	Runs	Home team	Attendance	Record
1963	June 20	Yankee Stadium	Mets	6‍–‍2	Yankees	50,742	Mets 1‍–‍0‍–‍0
1964	August 24	Shea Stadium	Yankees	6‍–‍4	Mets	55,396	Tied 1‍–‍1‍–‍0
1965	May 3	Yankee Stadium	Mets	2‍–‍1 (10)	Yankees	22,881	Mets 2‍–‍1‍–‍0
1966	June 27	Shea Stadium	Yankees	5‍–‍2	Mets	56,367	Tied 2‍–‍2‍–‍0
1967	July 12	Yankee Stadium	Mets	4‍–‍0	Yankees	31,852	Mets 3‍–‍2‍–‍0
1968	May 27	Shea Stadium	Yankees	3‍–‍4	Mets	35,198	Mets 4‍–‍2‍–‍0
1969	September 29	Shea Stadium	Yankees	6‍–‍7	Mets	32,720	Mets 5‍–‍2‍–‍0
1970	August 17	Yankee Stadium	Mets	4‍–‍9	Yankees	43,987	Mets 5‍–‍3‍–‍0
1971	September 8	Shea Stadium	Yankees	2‍–‍1	Mets	48,872	Mets 5‍–‍4‍–‍0
1972	August 24	Yankee Stadium	Mets	1‍–‍2	Yankees	52,308	Tied 5‍–‍5‍–‍0
1973	May 10	Shea Stadium	Yankees	4‍–‍8	Mets	—	Mets 6‍–‍5‍–‍0
1974	May 30	Shea Stadium	Yankees	9‍–‍4	Mets	35,894	Tied 6‍–‍6‍–‍0
1975	May 15	Shea Stadium	Yankees	9‍–‍4	Mets	—	Yankees 7‍–‍6‍–‍0
1976	June 14	Yankee Stadium	Mets	4‍–‍8	Yankees	36,361	Yankees 8‍–‍6‍–‍0
1977	June 23	Shea Stadium	Yankees	4‍–‍6	Mets	15,510	Yankees 8‍–‍7‍–‍0
1978	April 27	Yankee Stadium	Mets	3‍–‍4 (11)	Yankees	9,792	Yankees 9‍–‍7‍–‍0
1979	April 16	Shea Stadium	Yankees	1‍–‍1 (5)	Mets	13,719	Yankees 9‍–‍7‍–‍1
1982	May 27	Yankee Stadium	Mets	4‍–‍1	Yankees	41,614	Yankees 9‍–‍8‍–‍1
1983	April 21	Shea Stadium	Yankees	4‍–‍1	Mets	20,471	Yankees 10‍–‍8‍–‍1

== 1997–1999: Interleague regular season play begins ==
=== 1997–1998: First official games ===
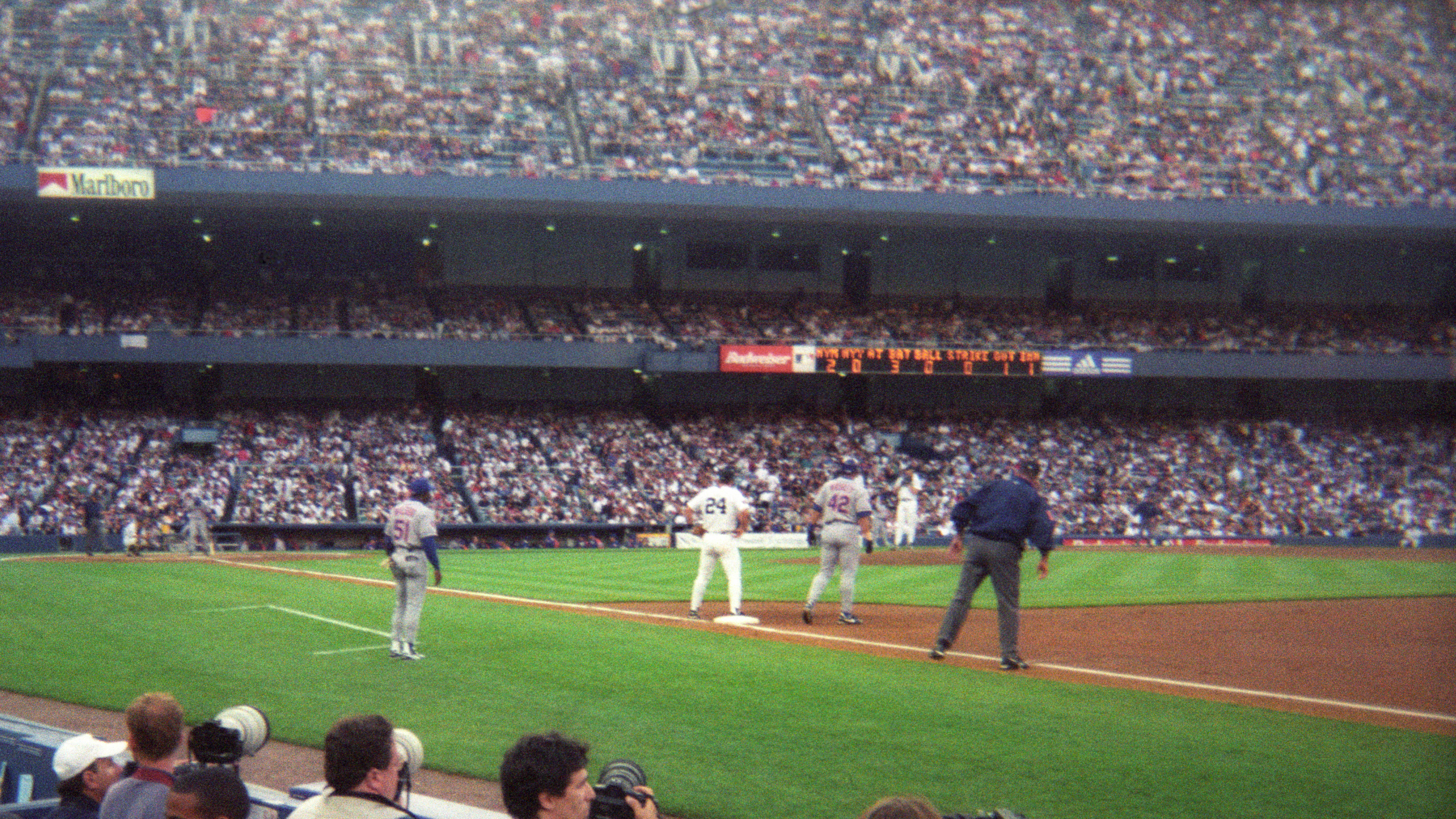
The first official Mets–Yankees game on June 16, 1997

In 1997, Major League Baseball scheduled official regular season games between the American and National Leagues for the first time. On June 16, the Mets and Yankees played their first official game at Yankee Stadium, which the Mets won 6–0 behind Dave Mlicki. The Yankees won the next two games for a series win. The Mets acquired Mike Piazza for the 1998 season and made a run for the playoffs but were eliminated in the last regular game series of the season by the Atlanta Braves. The Yankees won that year's interleague series at Shea Stadium two games to one and would also win the 1998 World Series, the first of three straight titles for them. David Cone won 20 games in 1998 for the Yankees, 10 years after he accomplished the same feat for the Mets, becoming the only player to win 20 games for both teams.

These interleague games between the Mets and Yankees would come to be referred to as a Subway Series, extending the use of that phrase outside the historical context of an all-New York World Series.

=== 1999: Both teams reach the playoffs ===
In 1999, Major League Baseball expanded Interleague play, allowing the Mets and Yankees to host a series at their home stadiums. At Shea, the Mets won their first series against the Yankees, 2 games to 1, though the regular season series was tied by virtue of a Yankees series win (2–1) at Yankee Stadium earlier that year. That year marked the first time both teams reached the playoffs in the same season, though the Mets needed an extra game for their first playoff appearance since losing the 1988 National League Championship Series.

Both the Mets and Yankees reached their respective League Championship Series and played their respective rivals. The Mets were defeated by their division rival Atlanta Braves in their LCS, while the Yankees defeated longtime rival Boston Red Sox in that year's ALCS. The Yankees then swept the Braves in the 1999 World Series for their 25th franchise title.

== 2000: World Series meeting ==
During the regular season on July 8, 2000, the Yankees defeated the Mets by identical 4–2 scores in both ends of an unusual day-night doubleheader. With the first game played at Shea Stadium and the nightcap at Yankee Stadium, it was the first time since 1903 that two teams played two games in different stadiums on the same day. Dwight Gooden won the first game with a six inning effort in his first start since returning to the Yankees. Roger Clemens won the nightcap. However, in the second game of that double header, an event occurred that made the rivalry between the two teams more contentious. Clemens hit Mets' star Mike Piazza in the helmet with an inside fastball, causing Piazza to suffer a concussion and placing him on the disabled list.

The Mets and Yankees returned to the playoffs that year and won their respective pennants, meeting in the 2000 World Series for their first championship contest. It was the Yankees' fourth appearance in five years and the Mets' first appearance since winning the title in 1986. It was the first Subway Series World Series since 1956. Game 1 went to extra innings in what was then the longest World Series game of all time, with the Yankees winning on a walk-off hit by former Met José Vizcaíno.

Controversy ensued in Game 2 when Yankees pitcher Roger Clemens faced Mets catcher Mike Piazza for the first time since the hit-by-pitch earlier that season. In the match-up, Piazza shattered his bat after fouling off one of Clemens' pitches, and the splintered bat head hurtled towards the mound. Clemens threw the bat head towards the baseline and nearly hit Piazza who had been running down the foul line. The incident caused both benches to clear. The Yankees won the game 6–5.

The Mets won Game 3, snapping the Yankees' fourteen-game winning streak in World Series play dating back to 1996 and Yankees hurler Orlando "El Duque" Hernandez's previously undefeated postseason record (6–0). However, this would prove to be the only high point for the Mets. Derek Jeter hit a home run on the first pitch of Game 4, immediately shifting momentum back to the Yankees who would win the game. Footage of this home run currently serves as the background for the title screen of YES Network's "Yankeeography" series. Despite no game in the series being decided by more than two runs, the Yankees would only require five games to beat the Mets. Al Leiter, a former Yankees prospect, would take the mound for the Mets in Game 5 and lose. The Yankees clinched their third straight World Series championship when Mariano Rivera got Mike Piazza to fly out for the final out of Game 5.

World Series MVP Derek Jeter said of the Mets: "In my opinion, the Mets were the toughest team we have played in my five years here. Every one of these games could have gone either way. They could have given up after [losing] the first two games, but they never quit. You can't say enough about the New York Mets."

This World Series win brought a sense of revenge for Roger Clemens, because he won the World Series in the same stadium; he had previously lost it in 1986 while with the Red Sox. Members of the Mets' 1986 team threw out the ceremonial first pitch before the clinching game.

The 12.4 television rating and 21 share of the 2000 World Series was the worst in history when it was played. For the Mets, the 12.4 rating was less than half of what they were when during their previous appearance, when Game 7 drew a 38.9 rating and 55 share.

== 2001–2008: The rivalry continues in the 21st century ==
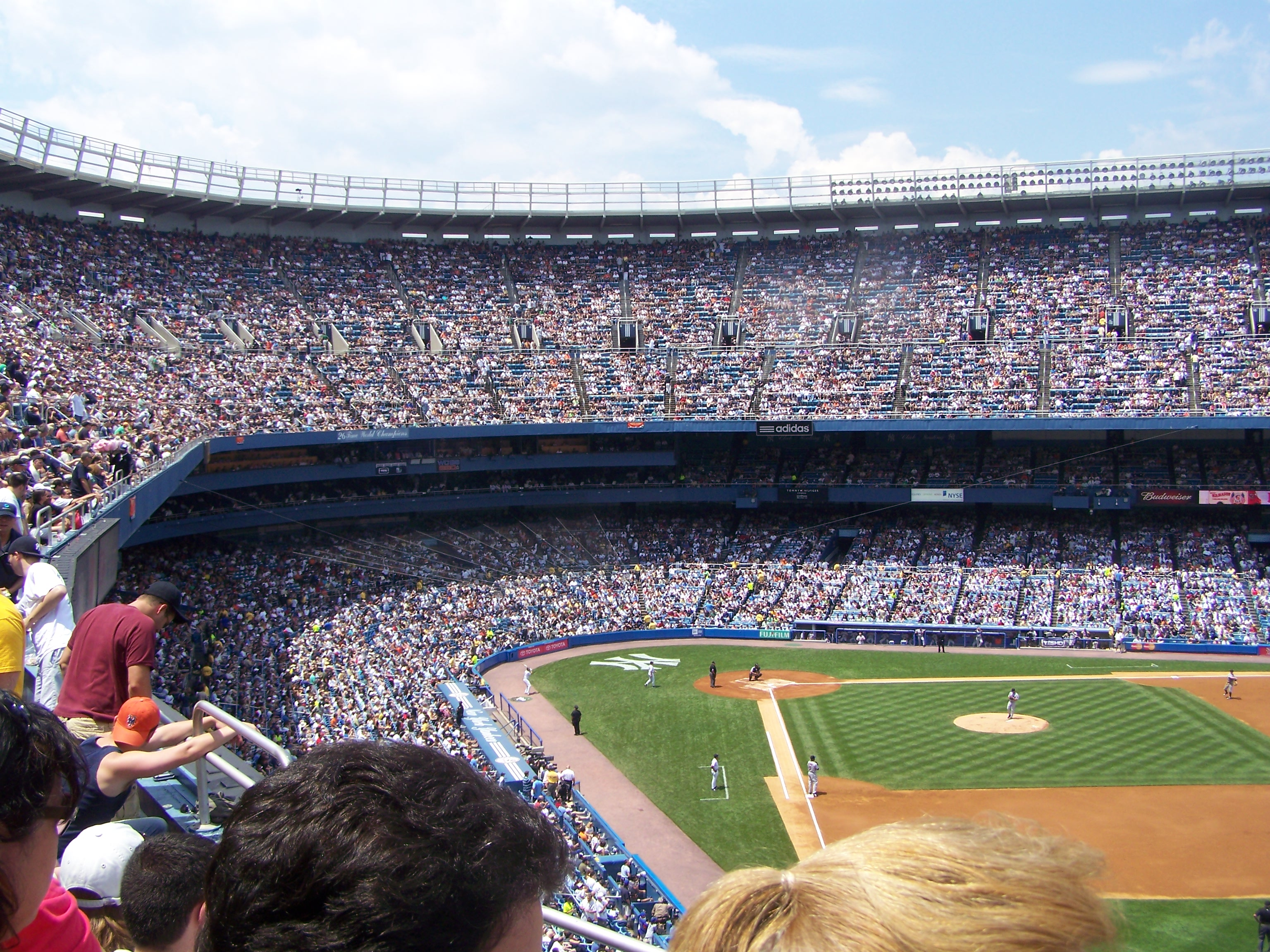
A full house at Yankee Stadium for a Subway Series game against the Mets on June 16, 2007

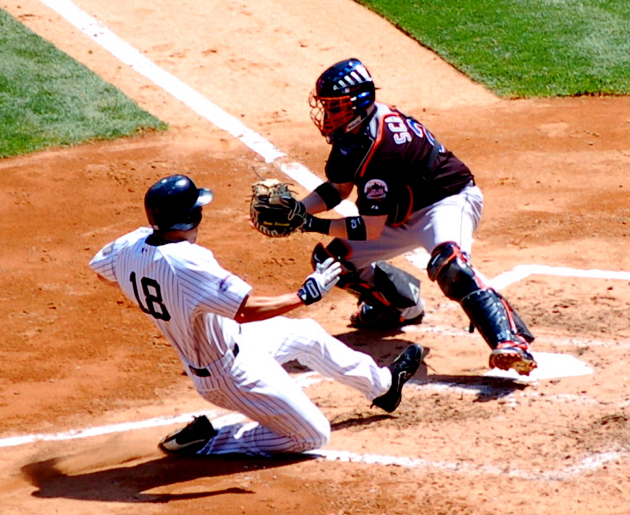
Subway Series 2008, Johnny Damon with the Yankees (left) and Brian Schneider with the Mets

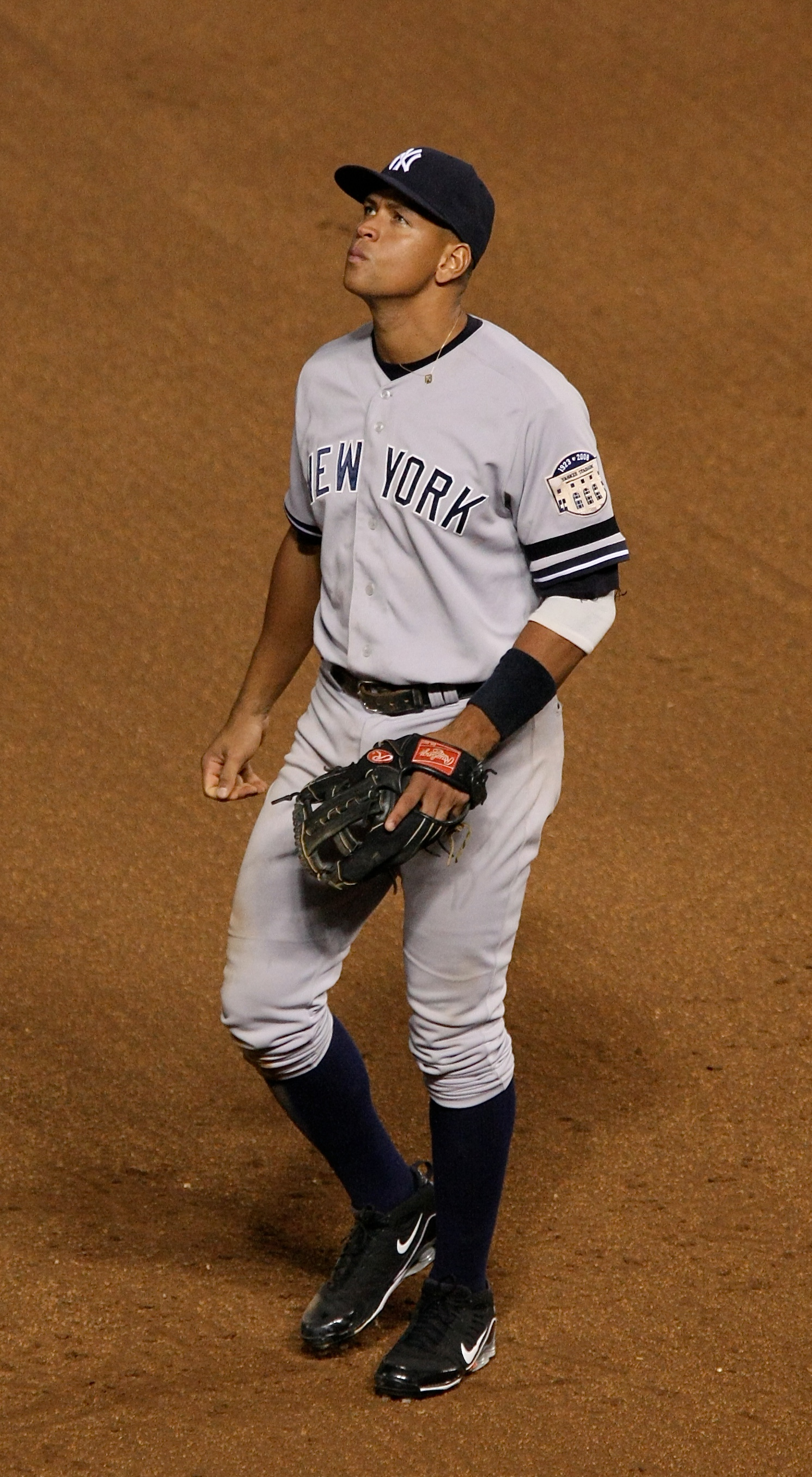
Alex Rodriguez played for the Yankees (2004–2016), but grew up as a fan of the New York Mets

The 2000 championship was the Yankees' last title until their 2009 World Series win. Since their appearance in 2000, the Mets would have several losing seasons until the emergence of David Wright and José Reyes.

In 2001, there was a moment of peace in the rivalry in the aftermath of the attacks in New York City. During the weekend of September 21–23, Shea Stadium hosted the first professional sporting event in New York City since the attacks when the Mets hosted the Atlanta Braves while Yankee Stadium hosted a special memorial service titled "Prayer for America."

On June 15, 2002, Roger Clemens faced the Mets for the first time at Shea Stadium since the Piazza controversy. Anticipation mounted about retaliation against Clemens. Mets manager Bobby Valentine chided Clemens by saying he wore a "skirt" when compared to past pitchers who threw hard at people like Bob Gibson and Don Drysdale because Clemens did not have to bat in the American League. When the game arrived, Clemens was forced to bat and Mets pitcher Shawn Estes attempted to hit Clemens in retaliation but instead threw a pitch behind Clemens, prompting the home plate umpire to warn both benches. Estes later homered off of Clemens as the Mets won the game 8–0.

In 2003, the Yankees become the first team to sweep the season series, winning all six games, including a two-park day-night doubleheader. In 2004, however, the Mets won the season series for the first time, going 4–2 and sweeping the three games at Shea Stadium.

In 2005, the Mets signed Manager Willie Randolph, who coached with the Yankees for over a decade. Randolph played much of his career with the Yankees and also played for the Mets before retiring as a player. Because of his history with the Yankees championship teams of the 70s (as a player) and the 90s (as a coach), he holds a very cordial relationship with Yankees fans despite his tenure with the Mets organization, as noted by a Subway (a pun on the restaurant's name and the Subway Series) commercial featuring him and former Yankees manager Joe Torre, who had managed the Yankees during their most recent dynastic run. Torre had also been associated with the Mets as they were the last team he ever played for and the first team he ever managed. On August 2, 2008, less than two months after his abrupt and controversial dismissal as Mets manager, Randolph was greeted with a standing ovation by the Yankee Stadium crowd when he appeared in a Yankees uniform for the Old-Timers' Game.

On June 26, 2005, the Mets won their first series at Yankee Stadium and were three outs from a sweep when Jason Giambi's bases-loaded single off of Braden Looper in the ninth drove home the tying and winning runs for the Yankees, who forced a season series split with the Mets.

On May 19, 2006, in the first Subway Series of that year at Shea, the Yankees took the lead three times in the first four innings, but the Mets rallied each time against Randy Johnson and the game was tied 6–6 going into the bottom of the ninth. With two outs and runners on first and second, David Wright drove home the winning run for the Mets with a single off of Yankees' closer Mariano Rivera.

On May 20, 2006, less than 24 hours after the Mets' comeback win, Pedro Martínez and Duaner Sánchez kept the Yankees scoreless for eight innings while the Mets scored four runs off of Mike Mussina. In the top of the ninth, however, closer Billy Wagner, who pitched a perfect ninth the night before to get the win, gave up four runs to tie the game and force extra innings. In the top of the 11th, Andy Phillips singled in the go-ahead run for the Yankees while Mariano Rivera pitched two shutout innings for the win.

History would be made at the 2006 Major League Baseball All-Star Game when two positions on both teams are manned by players from teams of the same city. David Wright and José Reyes started at third base and shortstop respectively for the National League while Alex Rodriguez and Derek Jeter started at the same respective positions for the American League. Both teams in 2006 finished at the top of their division in the same season for the first time in history. For the Yankees, this was their ninth straight division title, while the Mets won their first division title since 1988. Despite sharing baseball's best regular season record (97–65), they would have disappointing postseasons as both lost en route to the two teams that eventually met in that year's World Series, the Detroit Tigers and St. Louis Cardinals.

The teams' inverse success relationship was highlighted in 2007. On May 29, the Yankees were tied for last place and 14.5 games back of the Boston Red Sox while the Mets were in first place ahead of the Atlanta Braves by four games, with the lead being as high as seven in mid-September. A late season meltdown led to the Mets being eliminated from playoff contention, losing the NL East title to the Philadelphia Phillies on the last day of the season. On the other hand, the Yankees, though unable to finish first in the AL East for the first time since 1997, rebounded from their losing ways and clinched their 13th consecutive playoff berth.

In an article written in the New York Daily News on March 25, 2008, Alex Rodriguez said how he regretted signing with the Texas Rangers (the team the Yankees acquired him from) in the first place and wished he had signed with the Mets rather than Texas. Rodriguez grew up a Mets fan and of former Mets first baseman turned announcer Keith Hernandez. Rodriguez stated how he listened to his agent Scott Boras about taking more money instead and did not want to make the same mistake of not being on a team he liked playing for by leaving the Yankees.

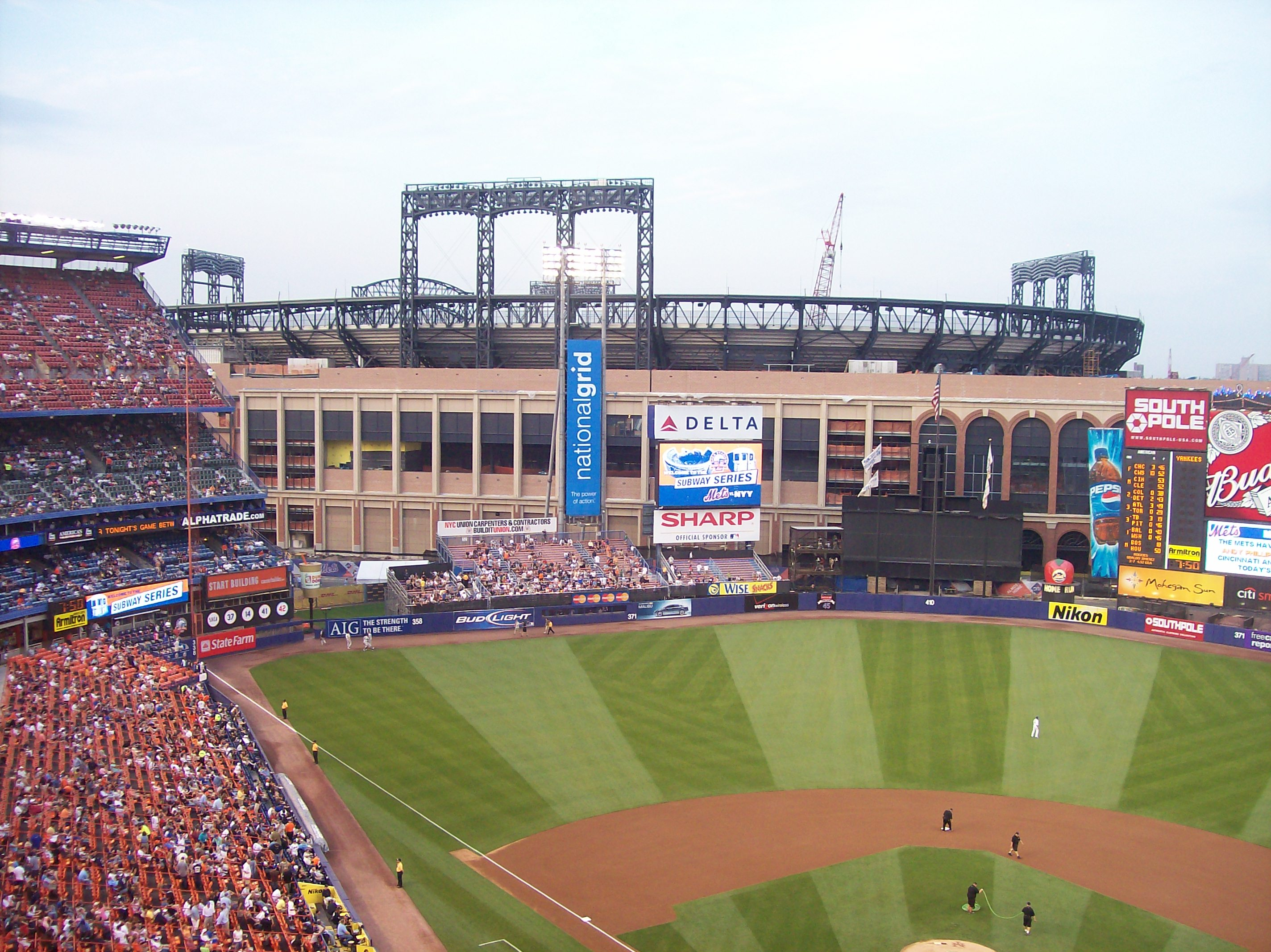
A Subway Series game at Shea Stadium on June 27, 2008, with Citi Field under construction beyond the outfield

On June 27 of that year, in the first game of a two-stadium, day-night doubleheader against the Yankees, Carlos Delgado had 9 RBIs (including a grand slam) in a 15–6 victory for the Mets, setting a team record for most RBIs in a single game and tying the record for most RBIs in a single game by a visiting player at Yankee Stadium. For just the second time, the Mets won the season series against the Yankees, 4–2, including the Mets' only sweep at the old Yankee Stadium.

The 2008 season marked the first time since 1993 that both the Yankees and Mets failed to qualify for postseason, the first time for the Yankees since that year and the second straight year where the Mets were eliminated on the last day of the season. It was also the last year both teams played at their old respective ballparks, Yankee Stadium and Shea Stadium. Yogi Berra, who played for both teams and managed both teams, was present at the closing ceremonies of both stadiums. Both teams finished with the same record (89–73) that year.

== 2009–2019: New stadiums ==
The 2009 season was the first year that both teams played in their new stadiums, Mets at Citi Field and the Yankees at the new Yankee Stadium. The Yankees took it one step further and opened their new stadium with their 27th World Series championship against the Philadelphia Phillies, the defending champions, becoming the first team to inaugurate two stadiums with World Series wins. However, this is the most recent World Series championship by a team from New York City.

On June 12, 2009, both teams played each other for the first time at the new Yankee Stadium. The game had several lead changes, including Mariano Rivera giving up the go-ahead run to the Mets in the 8th. In the bottom of the 9th, after Derek Jeter stole 2nd base and Mark Teixeira was intentionally walked, the Mets new closer Francisco Rodríguez (K-Rod) paired off against Alex Rodriguez (A-Rod). In what seemed to be a routine pop with two outs, Mets 2nd baseman and three time Gold Glove-award winner Luis Castillo dropped the ball. Teixeira wound up scoring the winning run all the way from first on the error, giving the Yankees a 9–8 victory. It would prove to be the Yankees' 7th walk off game that season and the first statistical blown save for K-Rod as a Met.

After the game, injured Yankees pitcher Brian Bruney criticized K-Rod and his animated behavior on the mound to reporters: "[It] couldn't have happened to a better guy on the mound, either", said Bruney. "He's got a tired act. ... He gets what he deserves, man. I just don't like watching the guy pitch. I think it's embarrassing." Rodriguez responded, "Instead of sending a message in the paper, next time when he sees me at Citi Field, come up to me and say it. Don't be sending a message to the media. I don't even know who that guy is, somewhere in Double-A and not even pitching one full season." Two days later, Francisco Rodriguez confronted Bruney during batting practice and the two were separated by teammates. The Yankees shut out the Mets 15–0 in the biggest blowout in the history of the series, tagging Mets ace Johan Santana for nine runs in 3 1/3 innings, the most Santana has ever allowed in his career.

On June 26, 2009, the two teams played each other for the first time at Citi Field. Alex Rodriguez hit his 564th home run, moving past Reggie Jackson into 11th place on the career home run list. The Yankees defeated the Mets 9–1 after the Mets committed three errors that led to four runs in the second inning - the most ever against the Yankees. Two days after that, Yankees closer Mariano Rivera, who entered the game to face a batter in the 8th inning, batted against Mets closer Francisco Rodriguez at the top of the 9th inning. Rivera drew a walk with the bases loaded, forcing home Brett Gardner to earn his first career RBI. Rivera would go on to finish the game and earn his 500th career save, as the Yankees swept the series at Citi Field.

May 22, 2010 had the Mets win their first Subway Series game at Citi Field with a 5–3 victory over the Yankees. Countering that, on June 20, 2010, the Yankees earned their 9,500th franchise victory with a 4–0 win over the Mets. Mark Teixeira provided the only runs of the game with a third-inning grand slam off of Johan Santana.

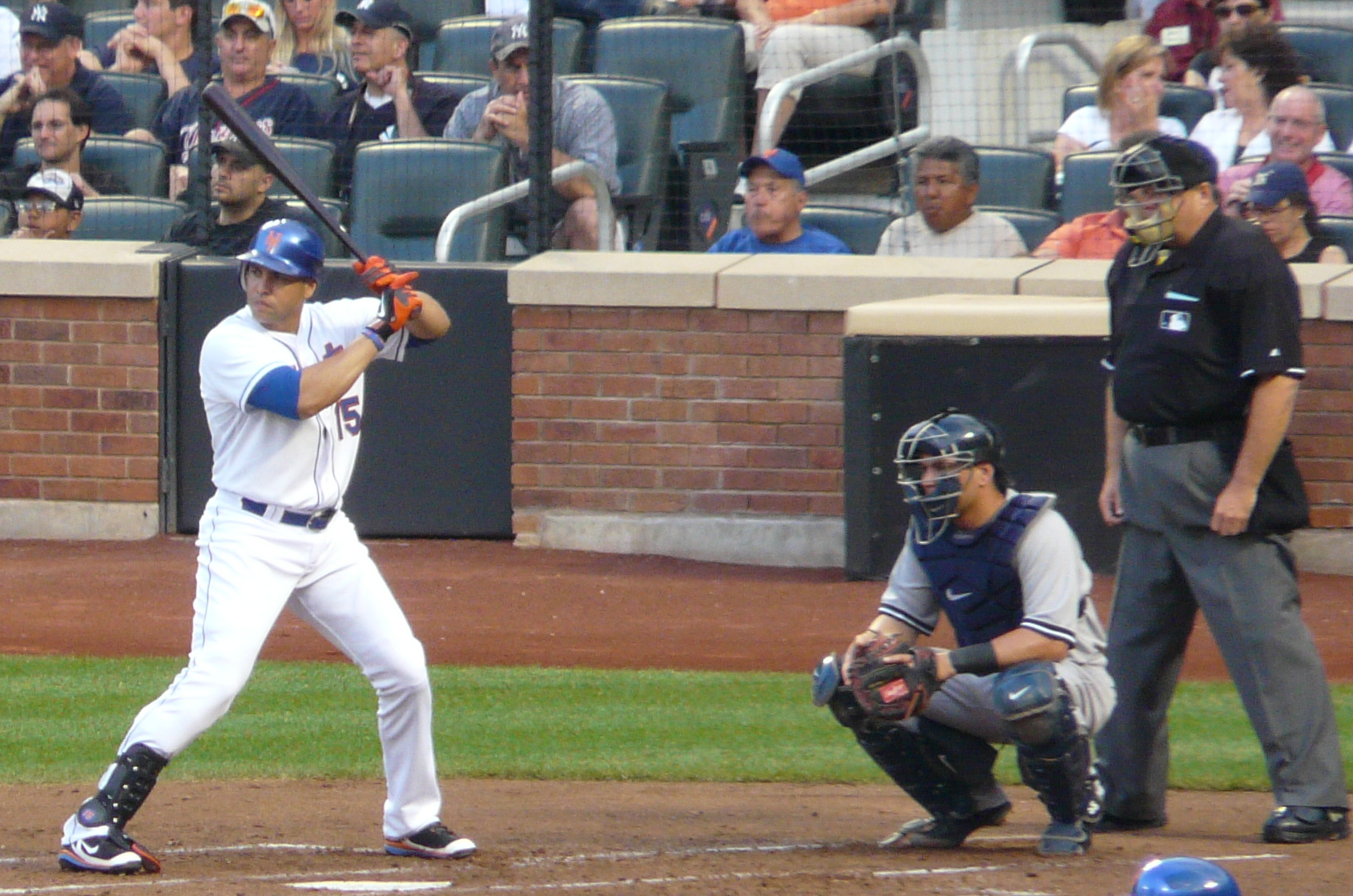
Carlos Beltrán bats for the Mets and Russell Martin catches for the Yankees during a 2011 game at Citi Field

On January 3, 2011, the Yankees signed left-handed relief pitcher Pedro Feliciano away from the Mets. Under the rules of the collective bargaining agreement of the time, the Yankees had to compensate the Mets with a draft pick. The Mets would use this draft pick to get pitcher Michael Fulmer. Feliciano would immediately go on the disabled list for the Yankees due to his overuse by the Mets during his career. Setbacks in surgery would prevent him from ever throwing a pitch for the Yankees during the entirety of the two-year contract.

During game between the two teams on July 3, 2011, the Mets, down to their final strike and on the verge of getting swept at Citi Field by the Yankees for the second time in three years, tied the final game of that year's Subway Series against Mariano Rivera in the bottom of the ninth on an RBI single from Ronny Paulino. In 23 previous save opportunities against the Mets, spanning the regular season and the 2000 World Series, Rivera had converted 22 (his only previous blown save against the team was on July 10, 1999). The Mets would win in the 10th inning on an RBI single from Jason Bay, who had been struggling all season, off of Héctor Noesí, though the loss was charged to former Mets pitcher Luis Ayala. Manager Terry Collins called the game "enormous." The Yankees still won the season series 4 games to 2.

On July 12, 2011, days after gaining entry into the 3,000 hit club, Yankees shortstop Derek Jeter elected to sit out of the 2011 Major League Baseball All-Star Game citing "physical and emotional exhaustion" and recovery from a recent visit to the disabled list. Jeter, who throughout his career had been praised by people in and out of baseball for good behavior, was criticized by some players and officials including Mets outfielder Carlos Beltrán. Beltrán stated that "I do believe, as a ballplayer, if you have no injuries, you should be here...the fans are the ones that vote for you and want to see you here." Mets shortstop José Reyes, who also was injured, also opined on the incident saying "I want to come no matter what happens."

The two teams met again in June 2012. On June 8, after pitching the first no-hitter in Mets history in his previous start, Johan Santana gave up a career-worst four home runs to the Yankees in the first Subway Series game of the year as the Mets, who were held hitless by Hiroki Kuroda until the sixth, lost 9–1. Two days later, after Rafael Soriano blew his first save of the year by surrendering an RBI double to Ike Davis in the top of the ninth, Russell Martin hit a home run in the bottom of the inning off of Jon Rauch to give the Yankees a 5–4 win and first-ever sweep of the Mets at the new Yankee Stadium.

On June 22, one day before first pitch between the two teams at Citi Field, Mets closer Frank Francisco taunted the Yankees by calling them chicken. Francisco's teammates greeted him in the Mets club house the next day with the Chicken Dance and put up a picture of Derek Jeter's head on the body of a chicken. "I can't wait to strike out those chickens, I want to strike out the side against them. I've done it before." Francisco would later go on to say "I make a simple comment, just that they complain a lot—for every call, for everything, I thought it was funny. I didn't expect to make a big deal." Although he would not strike out the side and allowed two base runners, Francisco did notch the save in the first game of the series before going on the disabled list. Mets reliever Tim Byrdak would go as far to bring a live chicken into the clubhouse and named it "Little Jerry Seinfeld" in honor of a Seinfeld episode. The chicken was used as an unofficial mascot and was donated to an animal farm sanctuary in upstate New York a few days later. Francisco later admitted that he himself raised chickens and is an expert about them.

Despite the Mets winning the opener, the Yankees wound up winning the next two games, including halting Mets pitcher R. A. Dickey's scoreless inning streak of 44 2/3 innings to win the series. Yankees outfielder Nick Swisher playfully quipped at the end of the series "Who's chicken now?"

For the first time ever on Opening Day, both teams played their first game in New York on April 1, 2013.

In his last regular-season game ever at Citi Field on May 28, Mariano Rivera was honored by Mets owner Jeff Wilpon and threw out the first pitch of the game to former Mets closer John Franco. Young Mets phenom Matt Harvey, who grew up a Yankees fan, had an impressive line – 8IP 6H 1ER 0BB 10K – but left with a 1–0 deficit. Rivera would come into the game in the bottom of the 9th and promptly give up a double to Mets second baseman Daniel Murphy. David Wright would get another hit to drive in Murphy and contribute to Rivera's first blown save of the year. The next batter Lucas Duda would get the game-winning hit off Rivera to give him the first blown save of his career where he did not record at least one out. The Mets swept the season series for the first time in 2013.

That July, Robinson Canó of the Yankees and David Wright of the Mets were named captains for the All-Star Game home run derby at Citi Field. In December, the Mets agreed to terms with outfielder Curtis Granderson on a four-year contract worth $60 million on December 6, 2013. Granderson played for the Yankees from 2010 to 2013. "A lot of the people I've met in New York have always said that, 'True New Yorkers are Mets fans,'" said Granderson during a press conference making the deal official. "So I'm excited to get a chance to see them all out there." Around the same time, the Yankees agreed to sign Carlos Beltrán, who was a Met from 2005 to 2011.

In 2015, both teams qualified for the postseason. The Yankees lost to the Houston Astros in the American League Wild Card Game, while the Mets lost the World Series to the Kansas City Royals, the only time during the 2010s decade that either the Yankees or the Mets appeared in a World Series. This loss made the 2010s decade the first decade since the 1910s that a team from New York City failed to win a World Series.

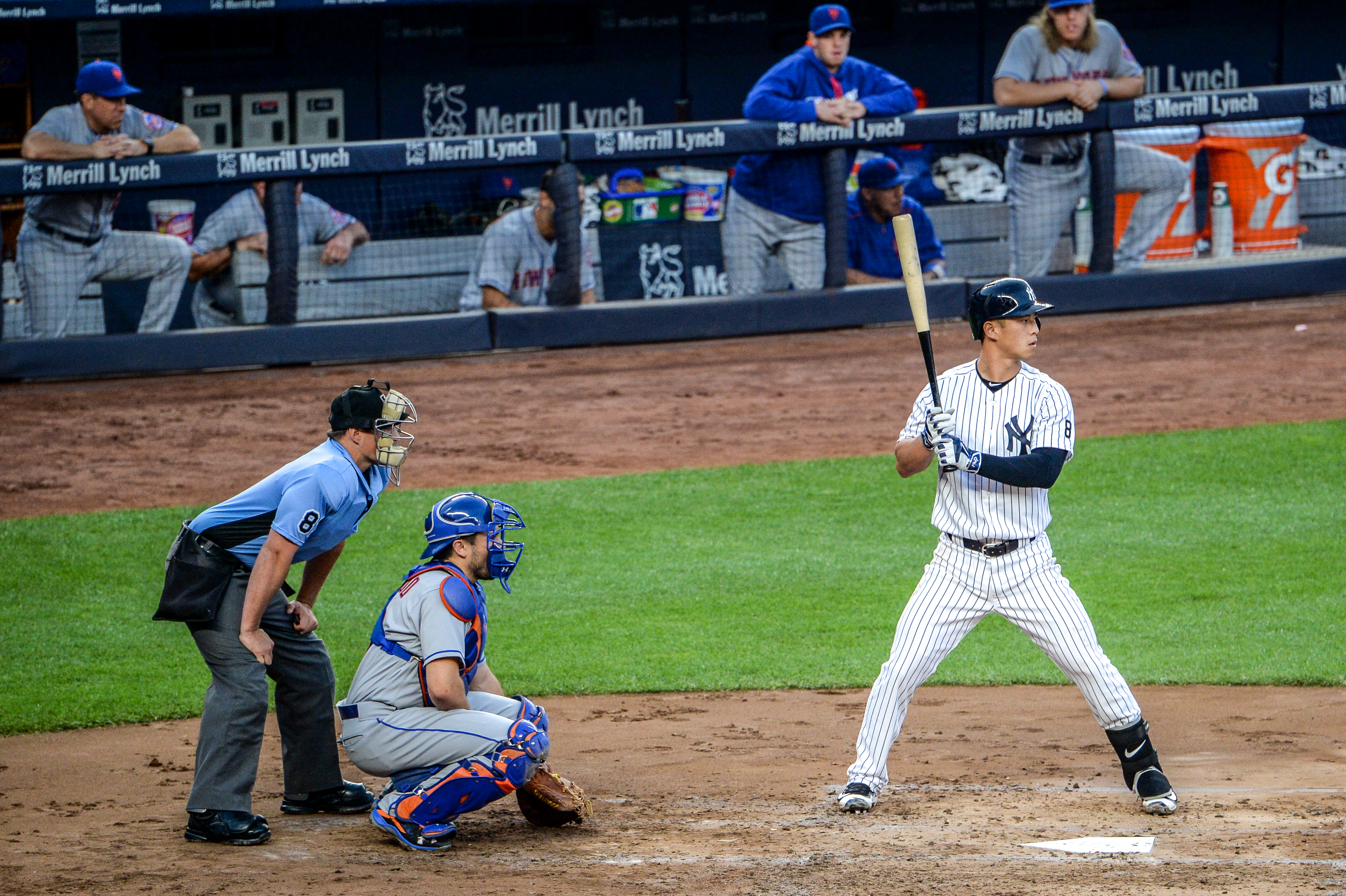
Rob Refsnyder bats for the Yankees and Travis d'Arnaud catches for the Mets during a 2016 game at Citi Field

In September 2017, due to Hurricane Irma, the Tampa Bay Rays had their series with the Yankees relocated to Citi Field. In reaction to a home run hit by Yankees third baseman Todd Frazier, Mets fan Gary Dunaier was caught on camera with a stern face and gesturing a thumbs down to protest the Yankees' success. The video of the incident went viral and Frazier and the Yankees would later adopt the thumbs down gesture as a rallying cry celebration to close out their season and during their playoff run. During the following off-season, Frazier would sign with the Mets.

The 2018 season marked the first time since 1992 that both the Mets and the Yankees had new managers to start the season. The Yankees parted ways with Joe Girardi after they lost in the 2017 ALCS to the eventual champion Houston Astros, and was replaced as skipper with 2003 ALCS hero Aaron Boone; Mets manager Terry Collins announced his retirement and moved into the team's front office after the season ended. Mickey Callaway, former pitching coach for the Cleveland Indians, took over as Mets manager.

== 2020–present: Both teams become postseason contenders ==
In 2020, hedge fund manager and billionaire Steve Cohen, purchased the Mets, ushering in a new era of competitiveness for New York City baseball. Cohen has promised an increase in payroll to turn the Mets into one of the highest-spending teams in the league, drawing comparisons to former Yankees owner George Steinbrenner.

During the 2020 season, the COVID-19 pandemic resulted in the Mets playing 2 "home" games at Yankee Stadium against the Yankees. The Mets won their first home game by the score of 4–3, as Amed Rosario, the Mets shortstop, hit a walk-off home run at Yankee Stadium. After the game, Rosario told reporters "I forgot we were the home team and that was the end of the game,” noting the unique characteristics of that season for both teams. As a result, Rosario became the first visiting player since Ed McKean of the St. Louis Perfectos in 1899 to hit a walk-off home run in the opposing team's ballpark.

Two days later, on August 30, the Yankees had a surprising victory of their own, as they came back from 7–2 down in the final inning to win the game 8–7 in extra innings. The Yankees were given a 1 in 500 chance of coming back in that game, and a walk off single by third baseman Gio Urshela in extra innings helped the Yankees finish the comeback.

In 2021, the two teams played on the weekend of the 20th anniversary of the September 11th attacks. In a game filled with pregame ceremonies and remembrances, the Yankees managed to win by a score of 8–7. Before the game, the two rivals came together in a show of unity by hugging which elicited an emotional reaction from the crowd. The next night, star Mets shortstop Francisco Lindor hit 3 home runs to propel the Mets to a 7–6 victory, becoming the first player in Subway Series history to hit 3 home runs in a single game.

2022 also marked the first time the teams completed a major trade in 18 years, as the Mets traded middle reliever Miguel Castro to the Yankees for reliever Joely Rodríguez. The trade did not end up being a success, as both players ended up playing for different teams in 2023. Nonetheless, both teams made the playoffs for the first time since 2015; with the Mets losing to the San Diego Padres in the wild card round and the Yankees, though defeating the Cleveland Guardians in the divisional round, eventually losing in a sweep to the Houston Astros in the ALCS.

In 2023, the Yankees and Mets had disappointing seasons, resulting in both teams missing the playoffs one year after they were among the top teams in their league, as the Yankees finished with 82 wins and the Mets finished with 75 wins. The 2023 season was seen as a massive letdown, as both the Yankees and Mets were among the pre-season favorites to win the World Series and both fell short of expectations.

Both teams returned to the postseason in 2024 and reached their respective LCS, giving that year's World Series a chance to be the first Subway Series since 2000. However, the Mets fell to the Los Angeles Dodgers, formerly a New York City team, in the NLCS while the Yankees defeated the Cleveland Guardians in the ALCS for their first AL pennant and World Series appearance since their championship season of 2009, though they also lost the World Series to the Dodgers, who became the first team in MLB history to eliminate two teams from the same city in the Postseason.

After the conclusion of the 2024 season, Yankees outfielder Juan Soto became a free agent. Both the Yankees and Mets engaged in a heated bidding war for the star. At the 2024 Winter Meetings, it was announced that Soto would sign with the Mets on a 15-year, $765 million contract, the largest contract in professional sports history. The deal sparked outrage among Yankees fans, particularly because Soto left the storied Yankees for the long-struggling Mets. Soto's signing has been widely seen as way of reigniting the rivalry, ushering in a new era of New York baseball.

The 2026 season saw the two teams square off at Yankee Stadium on the weekend of the 25th anniversary of September 11, 2001.

== Club success ==
Team	World Series Titles	League pennants	Division titles	Wild Card Berths	Playoff Appearances	World Series Appearances	All-time Regular Season record	Win percentage	Seasons played
New York Mets	2	5	6	5	11	5	4,899‍–‍5,227‍–‍8	.484	64
New York Yankees	27	41	21	10	60	41	10,872‍–‍8,216‍–‍88	.569	123
Combined	29	46	27	15	71	46	15,771‍–‍13,443‍–‍96	.540	123 in NY 187 total

Note: Pennants won by both teams include pennants won before the modern World Series.
As of the 2025 season.

=== Results ===
	Mets wins	Yankees wins	Mets runs	Yankees runs
Regular season	72	86	723	749
World Series	1	4	16	19
Total	73	90	739	768

Updated to most recent meeting, September 13, 2026.

== Season-by-season results ==
New York Mets vs. New York Yankees Season-by-Season Results
1990s (Yankees, 7–5)

Season	Season series		at New York Mets	at New York Yankees	Overall series	Notes
1997	Yankees	2‍–‍1	no games	Yankees, 2‍–‍1	Yankees; 2‍–‍1	Interleague play was introduced in the 1997 season, marking the first time the Mets and Yankees played each other in the regular season. First season series win for Yankees.
1998	Yankees	2‍–‍1	Yankees, 2‍–‍1	no games	Yankees; 4‍–‍2	Yankees finish with the best record in the league (114–48). Yankees win 1998 World Series.
1999	Tie	3‍–‍3	Mets, 2‍–‍1	Yankees, 2‍–‍1	Yankees; 7‍–‍5	First year of 6-game home and away format. Yankees win 1999 World Series.

2000s (Yankees, 39–26)

Season	Season series		at New York Mets	at New York Yankees	Overall series	Notes
2000	Yankees	4–2	Yankees, 2–1	Yankees, 2–1	Yankees; 11–7	On June 9 at Yankee Stadium, the Mets beat the Yankees 12–2, their highest run differential against the Yankees with a 10-run differential. Game scheduled on June 11 at Yankee Stadium was postponed to July 8 due to rain. Yankees sweep a split-ballpark doubleheader on July 8.
2000 World Series	Yankees	4‍–‍1	Yankees, 2‍–‍1	Yankees, 2‍–‍0	Yankees; 15‍–‍8	Clemens, Piazza brawl in Game 2. First "Subway Series" World Series since 1956 between Yankees and Brooklyn Dodgers. As of 21 November 2026, Yankees remain the most recent repeat champions.
2001	Yankees	4‍–‍2	Yankees, 2‍–‍1	Yankees, 2‍–‍1	Yankees; 19‍–‍10	Yankees lose 2001 World Series.
2002	Tie	3‍–‍3	Mets, 2‍–‍1	Yankees, 2‍–‍1	Yankees; 22‍–‍13	Clemens pitches and bats against Mets for the first time since the 2000 brawl. Yankees finish tied for the best record in the league (103–58).
2003	Yankees	6‍–‍0	Yankees, 3‍–‍0	Yankees, 3‍–‍0	Yankees; 28‍–‍13	Game scheduled on June 21 at Shea Stadium was postponed to June 28 for a doubleheader due to rain. First season series sweep for Yankees. Yankees finish tied for the best record in the league (101–61). Yankees lose 2003 World Series.
2004	Mets	4‍–‍2	Mets, 3‍–‍0	Yankees, 2‍–‍1	Yankees; 30‍–‍17	The game scheduled for June 25 at Yankee Stadium was postponed to June 27 as a doubleheader due to rain. First season series win for Mets. Yankees sweep doubleheader at Yankee Stadium June 27.
2005	Tie	3‍–‍3	Yankees, 2‍–‍1	Mets, 2‍–‍1	Yankees; 33‍–‍20	
2006	Tie	3‍–‍3	Mets, 2‍–‍1	Yankees, 2‍–‍1	Yankees; 36‍–‍23	On July 2 at Yankee Stadium, Yankees beat the Mets 16–7, their most runs scored in a game against the Mets. Both teams win their respective divisions and finish tied for the best record in the league with identical 97–65 records.
2007	Tie	3‍–‍3	Mets, 2‍–‍1	Yankees, 2‍–‍1	Yankees; 39‍–‍26	
2008	Mets	4‍–‍2	Yankees, 2‍–‍1	Mets, 3‍–‍0	Yankees; 41‍–‍30	Game scheduled on May 16 at Yankee Stadium was postponed to June 27 as a doubleheader due to rain. On June 27 at Yankee Stadium, Mets beat the Yankees 15–6, their most runs scored in a game against the Yankees. Last season Mets played at Shea Stadium. Last season Yankees played at original Yankee Stadium.
2009	Yankees	5‍–‍1	Yankees, 3‍–‍0	Yankees, 2‍–‍1	Yankees; 46‍–‍31	Mets open up Citi Field. Yankees open up Yankee Stadium. On June 14 at Yankee Stadium, Yankees beat the Mets 15–0, their highest run differential against the Mets with a 15-run differential. Yankees finish with the best record in the league (103–59). Yankees win 2009 World Series.

2010s (Yankees, 29–21)

Season	Season series		at New York Mets	at New York Yankees	Overall series	Notes
2010	Tie	3‍–‍3	Mets, 2‍–‍1	Yankees, 2‍–‍1	Yankees; 49‍–‍34	
2011	Yankees	4‍–‍2	Yankees, 2‍–‍1	Yankees, 2‍–‍1	Yankees; 53‍–‍36	
2012	Yankees	5‍–‍1	Yankees, 2‍–‍1	Yankees, 3‍–‍0	Yankees; 58‍–‍37	
2013	Mets	4‍–‍0	Mets, 2‍–‍0	Mets, 2‍–‍0	Yankees; 58‍–‍41	Series changes to 4-game home and away format except in years the AL East plays the NL East (2015, 2018, 2020, and 2021). First season series sweep for Mets.
2014	Tie	2‍–‍2	Yankees, 2‍–‍0	Mets, 2‍–‍0	Yankees; 60‍–‍43	First time road team sweeps all four games.
2015	Yankees	4‍–‍2	Yankees, 2‍–‍1	Yankees, 2‍–‍1	Yankees; 64‍–‍45	Mets lose 2015 World Series.
2016	Tie	2‍–‍2	Tie, 1‍–‍1	Tie, 1‍–‍1	Yankees; 66‍–‍47	
2017	Yankees	4‍–‍0	Yankees, 2‍–‍0	Yankees, 2‍–‍0	Yankees; 70‍–‍47	Second season series sweep for Yankees since the 2003 season.
2018	Tie	3‍–‍3	Yankees, 2‍–‍1	Mets, 2‍–‍1	Yankees; 73‍–‍50	Game scheduled on July 22 at Yankee Stadium was postponed to August 13 due to inclement weather.
2019	Tie	2‍–‍2	Tie, 1‍–‍1	Tie, 1‍–‍1	Yankees; 75‍–‍52	Game scheduled on June 10 at Yankee Stadium was postponed to June 11 as a doubleheader due to inclement weather and rain.

2020s (Mets, 21–15)

Season	Season series		at New York Mets	at New York Yankees	Overall series	Notes
2020	Tie	3‍–‍3	Mets, 2‍–‍1	Yankees, 2‍–‍1	Yankees; 78‍–‍55	Mets sweep doubleheader at Yankee Stadium August 28. Yankees sweep doubleheader at Yankee Stadium August 30. Game two of each doubleheader were considered Mets home games per MLB; two of three scheduled Mets home games were moved from Citi Field to Yankee Stadium due to the COVID-19 pandemic. These two games were split 1–1.
2021	Mets	4‍–‍2	Mets, 2‍–‍1	Mets, 2‍–‍1	Yankees; 80‍–‍59	Game scheduled on July 2 at Yankee Stadium was postponed to July 4 as a doubleheader due to rain. Teams split doubleheader at Yankee Stadium on July 4.
2022	Tie	2‍–‍2	Mets, 2‍–‍0	Yankees, 2‍–‍0	Yankees; 82‍–‍61	Mets finish the Wild Card for the best record in the league (101–61). Home team sweeps the season series for the first time.
2023	Tie	2‍–‍2	Tie, 1‍–‍1	Tie, 1‍–‍1	Yankees; 84‍–‍63	Permanent adoption of the four-game series format, with two games in each ballpark every season.
2024	Mets	4‍–‍0	Mets, 2‍–‍0	Mets, 2‍–‍0	Yankees; 84‍–‍67	Second season series sweep for Mets since the 2013 season. Yankees lose 2024 World Series.
2025	Tie	3‍–‍3	Mets, 2‍–‍1	Yankees, 2‍–‍1	Yankees; 87‍–‍70	Return of six-game format with each team hosting a three-game weekend series.
2026	Tie	3‍–‍3	Mets, 2‍–‍1	Yankees, 2‍–‍1	Yankees; 90‍–‍73	
2027	Tie	0‍–‍0	Upcoming at Mets, May 28‍–‍30	Upcoming at Yankees, July 16‍–‍18	Yankees ??‍–‍7?	

Summary of Results

Season	Season series		at New York Mets	at New York Yankees	Notes
Regular season games	Yankees	86‍–‍72	Yankees, 40‍–‍39	Yankees, 46‍–‍33	
Postseason games	Yankees	4‍–‍1	Yankees, 2‍–‍1	Yankees, 2‍–‍0	
Postseason series	Yankees	1‍–‍0	1‍–‍0	1‍–‍0	World Series: 2000
Regular and postseason	Yankees	90‍–‍73	Yankees, 42‍–‍40	Yankees, 48‍–‍33	

== Notable players that played for both teams ==
A total of 172 players have played for both franchises.

Name	Position(s)	Mets tenure	Yankees tenure
Harrison Bader	Center fielder	2024	2022–2023
Carlos Beltrán	Center fielder	2005–2011	2014–2016
Yogi Berra	Catcher / Outfielder	1965	1946–1963
Dellin Betances	Pitcher	2020–2021	2011, 2013–2019
Paul Blackburn	Pitcher	2024–2025	2025–present
Jay Bruce	Outfielder / First baseman	2016–2017, 2018	2021
Robinson Canó	Second baseman	2019–2022	2005–2013
Carlos Carrasco	Pitcher	2021–2023	2025
Miguel Castro	Pitcher	2020–2021	2022
Bartolo Colón	Pitcher	2014–2016	2011
David Cone	Pitcher	1987–1992, 2003	1995–2000
Ike Davis	First baseman	2010–2014	2016
J. D. Davis	Third baseman	2019–2022	2024
Todd Frazier	Third baseman	2018–2019, 2020	2017
Dwight Gooden	Pitcher	1984–1994	1996–1997, 2000
Curtis Granderson	Outfielder	2014–2017	2010–2013
Adeiny Hechavarria	Infielder	2019	2018
Rickey Henderson	Outfielder	1999–2000	1985–1989
Clay Holmes	Pitcher	2025–2026	2021–2024
Kelly Johnson	Infielder / Outfielder	2015, 2016	2014
Al Leiter	Pitcher	1998–2004	1987–1989, 2005
Tim Locastro	Outfielder	2023	2021–2022
Elliott Maddox	Outfielder / Third baseman	1978–1980	1974–1976
Frankie Montas	Pitcher	2025	2022–2023
Eduardo Núñez	Infielder	2020	2010–2013
Adam Ottavino	Pitcher	2022–2024	2019–2020, 2025
Willie Randolph	Second baseman	1992	1976–1988
David Robertson	Pitcher	2023	2008–2014, 2017–2018
Joely Rodríguez	Pitcher	2022	2021
Amed Rosario	Shortstop	2017–2020	2025–present
Gary Sánchez	Catcher	2023	2015–2021
Rafael Santana	Shortstop	1984–1987	1988
Luis Severino	Pitcher	2024	2015–2019, 2021–2023
Gary Sheffield	Right fielder	2009	2004–2006
Chasen Shreve	Pitcher	2020, 2022	2015–2018
Austin Slater	Outfielder	2026	2025
Juan Soto	Outfielder	2025–present	2024
Darryl Strawberry	Right fielder / Designated hitter	1983–1990	1995–1999
Marcus Stroman	Pitcher	2019, 2021	2024–2025
Anthony Swarzak	Pitcher	2018	2016
Ron Swoboda	Outfielder	1965–1970	1971–1973
Marv Throneberry	First baseman / Right fielder	1962–1963	1955, 1958–1959
Michael Tonkin	Pitcher	2024	2024
José Vizcaíno	Shortstop / Second baseman	1994–1996	2000
Neil Walker	Second baseman / Utility player	2016–2017	2018
Luke Weaver	Pitcher	2026	2023–2025
Justin Wilson	Pitcher	2019–2020	2015, 2021
Devin Williams	Pitcher	2026–present	2025

== Managers of both teams ==
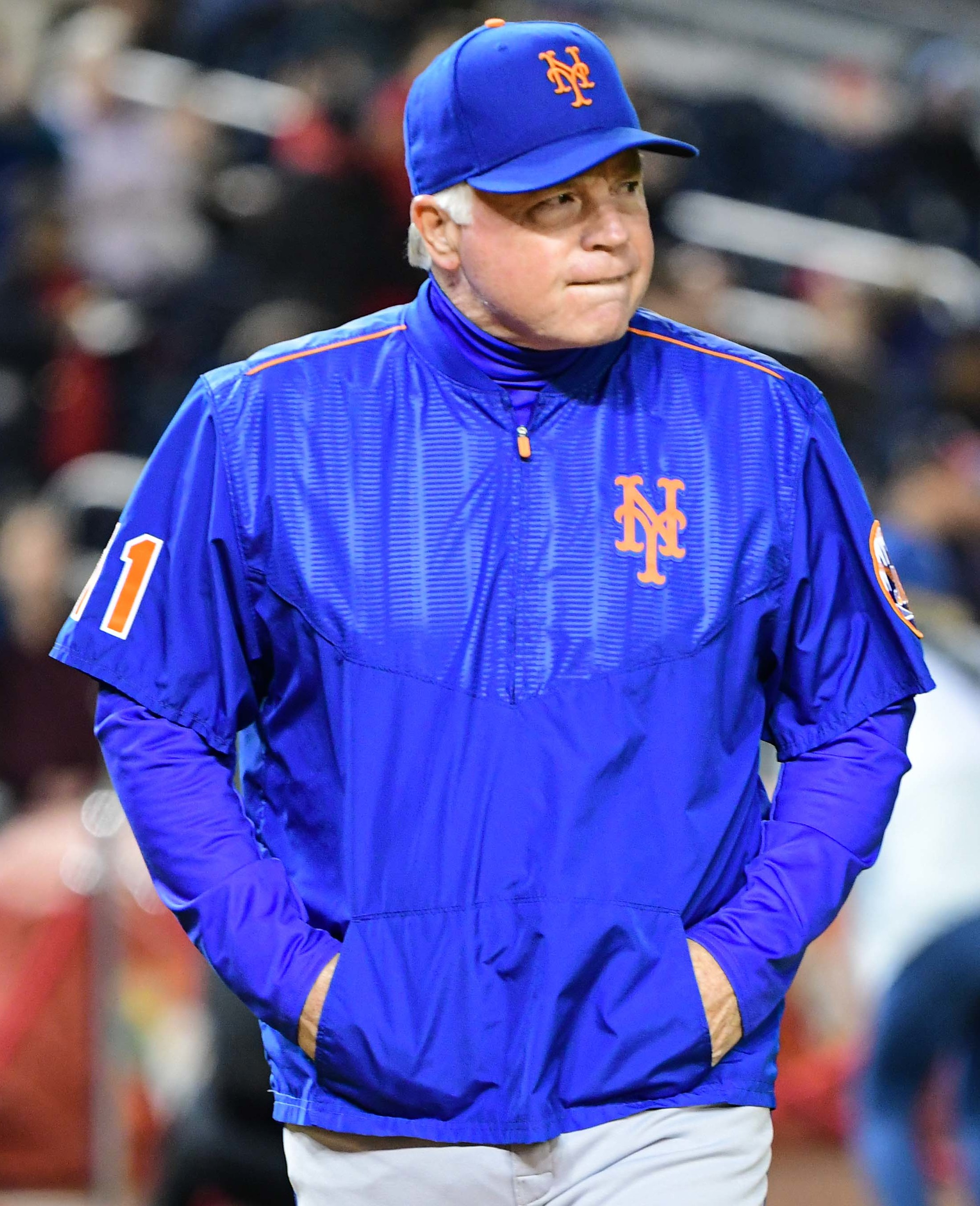
Buck Showalter, Mets manager from 2022–23, was the fifth person to have managed both the Yankees and the Mets.

Name	Mets tenure	Yankees tenure
Yogi Berra	1972–1975	1964, 1984–1985
Dallas Green	1993–1996	1989
Buck Showalter	2022–2023	1992–1995
Casey Stengel	1962–1965	1949–1960
Joe Torre	1977–1981	1996–2007

Showalter is the only person to have won Manager of the Year honors with both the Yankees and the Mets. In fact, he was the first manager of either team to win the award. In addition, he and Yogi Berra are the only managers to have managed both teams in the postseason. Berra is the only person to have managed both teams to pennants; Yankees in 1964 and Mets in 1973, the latter is the only time between 1970 and 1980 that the National League East wasn't won by either the Philadelphia Phillies or the Pittsburgh Pirates.

== Fan cheering groups ==
Alongside the players and the team staff, it is the fans that have defined the rivalry that has been present since the beginning of interleague play. The two teams' stadium fan groups, which would tend to meet each other during the current interleague Subway Series, are (with their respective assigned sections):

- Bleacher Creatures – Yankees, Section 203, Yankee Stadium (active since mid-1990s, formerly at sections 37 and 39 of the old Yankee Stadium)
- The 7 Line Army – Mets, Big Apple Reserved Section, Citi Field (active since 2012)

== Fan demographics ==
In 1998, the Independent Budget Office of the city of New York published a study on the economic effect of the city's two Major League Baseball teams. The study included an analysis of where fans of both the Mets and the Yankees resided. The study found that 43% of Mets fans lived in one of the five boroughs of New York, 39% in the tri-state area outside the city and 12% elsewhere. Mets fans were more likely to be found in Queens, Brooklyn and the Long Island counties of Nassau and Suffolk, whereas Manhattan, the Bronx, Staten Island, Northern New Jersey, Connecticut, and the counties of Westchester and Rockland, as well as the upper Hudson Valley and the upstate New York region, leaned more towards the Yankees. Mets, Yankees and Toronto Blue Jays fans are shared in Western New York. In addition, the overwhelming majority of local Italian Americans are Yankees fans, while the overwhelming majority of local Jewish Americans are Mets fans.

=== Wall Street Journal report ===
In what The Wall Street Journal called an "Exclusive Poll" conducted in 2010, the newspaper compared the differences between Mets fans and Yankees fans. The poll found:

- While Yankees fans outnumbered Mets fans by almost two-to-one (60% to 33%), Mets fans also tend to be more invested in their team: Not only do they monitor their team's progress more often (75% of Mets fans follow the team on a daily basis vs. 60% of Yankees fans) and make more bets, they listen to substantially more sports radio (26% to 17%)."
- Mets fans drink more:
  - Male Mets fans were more likely than Yankees fans to drink beer:
  - They also drink more in general: the percentage of male Yankees fans who said they don't drink was almost double that of their Mets counterparts (28% to 17%).
- There was no statistically significant disparity in income between the two fanbases:
  - The poll found 33% of Yankees fans made over $100,000 annually, compared to 22% of Mets fans, a gap which was within the poll's 3.8% margin of error.
  - While Yankees fans were more likely to fall into the upper and lower brackets, Mets fans were more likely to be middle class.
- Yankee fans were more likely to own pets (47% to 42%) and be married (48% to 43%).

=== Fans of other New York City teams ===
Historically, Yankees fans tend to root for the New York Giants (who once played in Yankee Stadium) and the New York Rangers (all three being the older, more established teams), while Mets fans tend to root for the New York Jets (who once played in Shea Stadium) and New York Islanders. However, some Yankees fans root for the Jets (both teams have intense rivalries with Boston, as the fierce Red Sox–Yankees rivalry has led to the rivalry between the New York Jets and the New England Patriots, The Boston Bruins and New York Rangers and the New York Knicks and the Boston Celtics), while some Mets fans root for the Giants as part of their hatred for their counterparts in Philadelphia (Phillies and Eagles), as well as the rivalry between the New York Rangers and the Philadelphia Flyers in the National Hockey League. However Yankees and Mets fans are split when it comes to basketball and soccer (the New York Knicks, Brooklyn Nets; New York Red Bulls, and New York City FC, respectively).

== Rivalry outside baseball ==
Outside Major League Baseball, the teams rivalry has shown passions from fans of both sides.

- In the 1991 movie City Slickers starring Billy Crystal, Crystal's character is seen wearing a Mets hat. Crystal himself in reality is an avid and outspoken Yankees fan, so much that he had a personal friendship with his boyhood idol Mickey Mantle in as much he produced the movie 61* about Mantle and Roger Maris's chase for Babe Ruth's all-time record for home runs hit in a season. Crystal also celebrated his 60th birthday by signing a one-day contract with the Yankees in the 2008 Spring training.
- The TV series Seinfeld featured a subplot in which George Costanza, played by Jason Alexander, was employed as a travelling secretary for the Yankees and interacted with a fictional version of team owner George Steinbrenner, played by series co-creator Larry David. Co-creator and star Jerry Seinfeld is an avid and outspoken Mets fan in the show and in real life.
- In the movie Two Weeks Notice, Sandra Bullock and Hugh Grant's characters Lucy Kelson and George Wade attended a Mets game. When an opposing player hit a pop-fly and Mets catcher Mike Piazza went towards the stands to get it, Lucy reached over and stole the pop fly from Piazza, preventing him from getting the player out. Piazza quipped saying she should be a Yankees fan.
- During the 2000 World Series, the Mayor of New York City, Rudy Giuliani, showed no remorse in his partisan support of the Yankees despite being the sitting mayor in office, though he had attended Mets games before and after. Examples of this include the Mets opened the 1996 season, he threw out the ceremonial first pitch along with the Governor of New York George Pataki, during the Mets' season opener in 1998, and when the Mets hosted the first professional sporting event in New York since September 11, 2001.
- In 2010, pop star singer and Yankees fan Lady Gaga attended a Mets game at Citi Field with the San Diego Padres where she gave Mets fans the middle finger. Jerry Seinfeld criticized Gaga for the incident due to children being at the game and became upset knowing that she had done the action from his personal luxury box.
- In 2013, Chris Christie, former Governor of New Jersey, stated his support of the Mets and confusion over why Yankees fans jeer Mets fans:

OK, here's what I don't understand about Yankees fans: The Mets stink. We're awful. And the Yankees are usually really good. So why do you boo us? You should feel badly for us. We root for this awful team that never wins and yet the Yankees fans boo us. I don't understand that. And other Mets fans say boo to the Yankees because they say boo to us and is not fair about that so they should care about the two New York team especially when they go see the team play the subway series and they should all cheer up on the subway series.

== See also ==
- Subway Series
- Major League Baseball rivalries
- Other New York sporting rivalries:
  - Knicks–Nets rivalry – NBA
  - Islanders–Rangers rivalry – NHL
  - Devils–Rangers rivalry – NHL
  - Hudson River Derby – MLS
  - Giants–Jets rivalry – NFL
