= Bleacher Creatures =

Group of fans of the New York Yankees

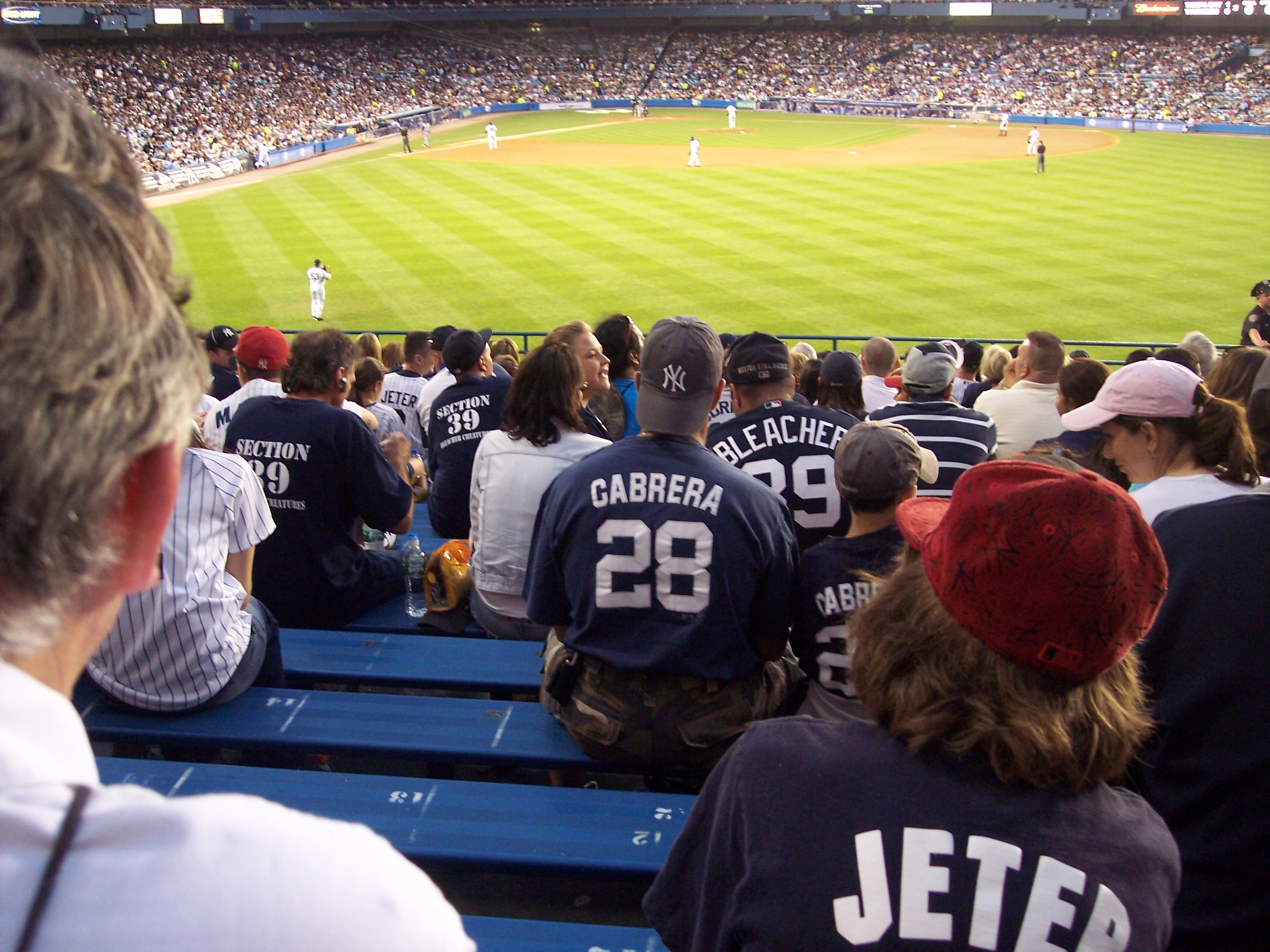
Bleachers section 39 at the old Yankee Stadium.

The Bleacher Creatures are a group of fans of the New York Yankees who are known for their strict allegiance to the team and their fierce attitude towards opposing fans and teams. The group's nickname was used famously by New York Daily News columnist Filip "Flip" Bondy during the 1990s, and then he spent the 2004 season sitting with the Creatures for research on his book about the group, Bleeding Pinstripes: A Season with the Bleacher Creatures of Yankee Stadium, which was published in 2005.

A prominent aspect of the Bleacher Creatures is their use of chants and songs. The most distinguished of these is the "roll call", which is done at the beginning of every home game. Often, the opposing team's right fielder, who stands right in front of the Creatures, is a victim of their jeers and insults. For the last two decades of the original Yankee Stadium, the Creatures occupied sections 37 and 39 of the right field bleachers. In 2009, when the Yankees' new stadium was built, they were relocated and currently sit in section 203 of the right-field bleachers. Over the years, the Creatures have attracted controversy regarding their use of inappropriate chants along with their rowdiness.

== History ==
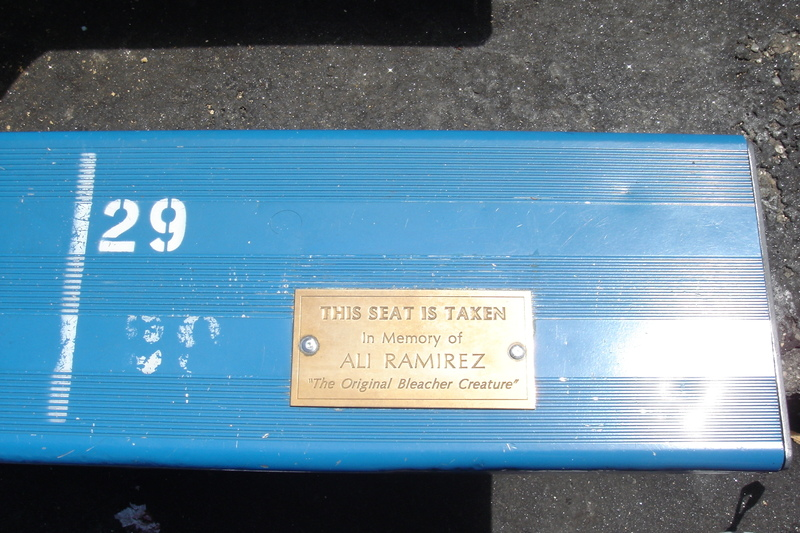
The seat with a plaque dedicated to Ali Ramirez in old Yankee Stadium: section 39, row A, seat 29

In 1996, New York Daily News columnist Filip "Flip" Bondy was asked to write a story from the fans' perspective. In that regular column, he took on the persona of "the Bleacher Creature," coining the nickname in relation to the Yankee Stadium inhabitants. The term "bleacher creature" has been used in reference to dedicated fans and supporters since the early 1980s. The founding of the Yankees Bleacher Creatures is often credited to Ali Ramirez. Ramirez rang a cowbell to inspire the fans to cheer, much like Freddy Sez's efforts in the Stadium's main grandstand, during the team's limited success in the early 1980s and 1990s. In 1986, a New York Daily News article stated that Ramirez went to almost every home Yankees game for more than 20 years. Ramirez died on May 8, 1996, and was given a tribute by the Yankees front office before the May 14 game against the Seattle Mariners, a game in which Yankees pitcher Dwight Gooden threw a no-hitter. There was a plaque where he sat, in section 39, row A, seat 29 which read "This seat is taken. In memory of Ali Ramirez, 'The Original Bleacher Creature.'" A similar plaque was added to the new stadium.

Because of the rowdiness of the fans, and the fact that many families began sitting in the more affordable bleachers, alcoholic beverages were banned from the bleachers in 2000. Yankees Stadium vendor Ted Banks commented that "There wasn't any special reason for that, it just got out of hand. Those people used to get wild when Jose Canseco played for the A's. A few people threw things at Ken Griffey Jr." Canseco asked Oakland Athletics manager Tony La Russa to move him from right field due to the continued chants and jeers from the Creatures. The Yankees have instituted rules for the bleacher sections to help control potential disruption. In 2000, alcohol sales were banned throughout the bleacher sections. In addition, anti-profanity rules have been in place for fans throughout the stadium. Lonn Trost, the Yankees chief operating officer, stated the team want to foster a "fan-friendly environment".

Right about now, I'd be all stressed out on the mound. This is great. I love the view. It's a lot less stressful out here.

— David Cone, on sitting with the Bleacher Creatures,

On April 5, 2002, pitcher David Cone spent the season's home opener with the Bleacher Creatures in section 39, and even participated in their chants. After the final game played at Yankee Stadium on September 21, 2008, Yankees first baseman Tino Martinez revealed that he had sat with the Creatures during the game the day before. Martinez said he wore a Yankees jacket, glasses and a hat, and that no one recognized him. In addition to former players, numerous celebrities and public figures have sat with the Creatures, including Yankees general manager Brian Cashman and U.S. Supreme Court Justice Sonia Sotomayor.

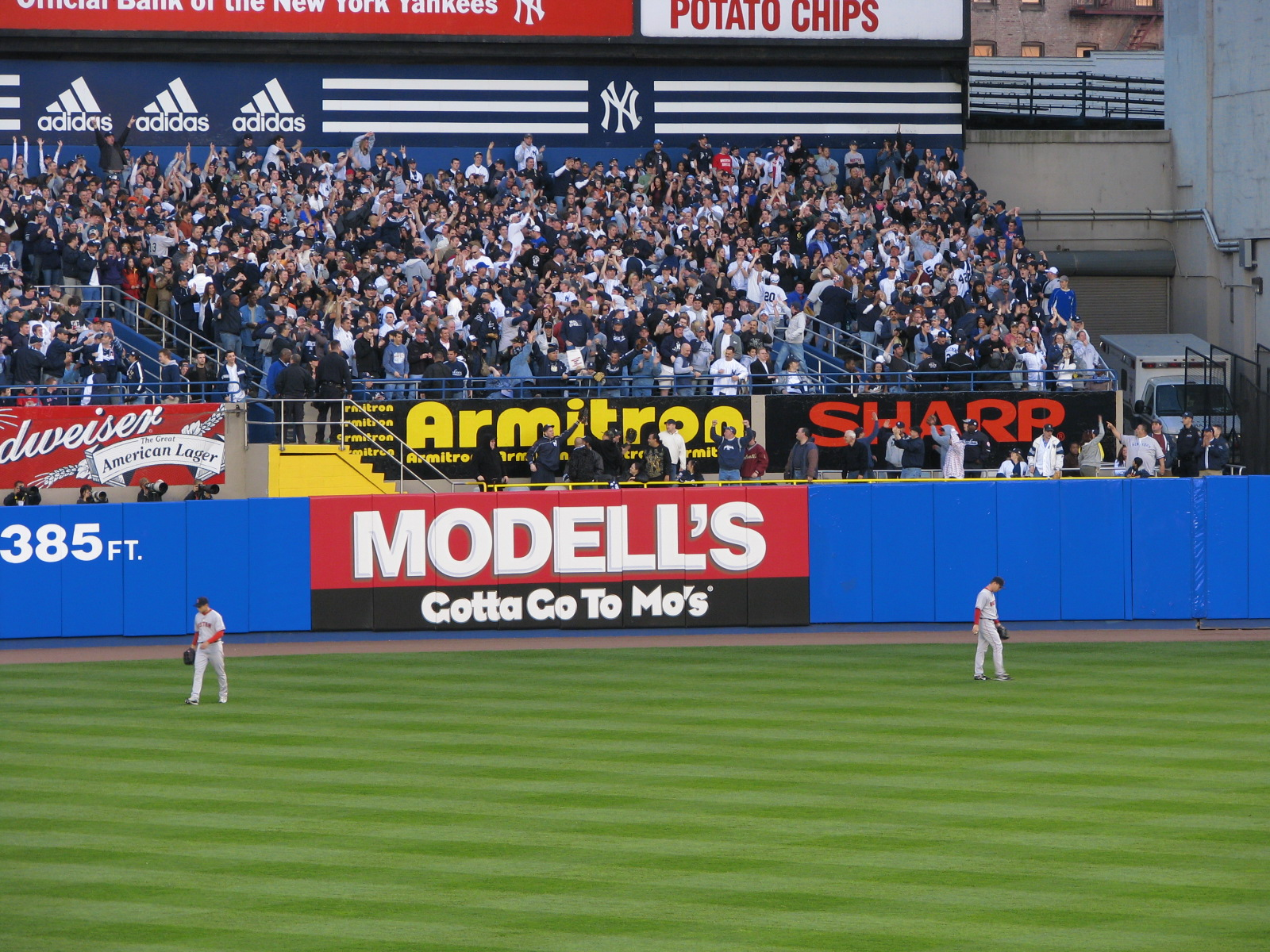
Wide shot of the bleachers at the old Yankee Stadium from the infield

In 2004, Bondy spent the season among the Creatures and wrote a book about his experience, entitling it Bleeding Pinstripes: A Season with the Bleacher Creatures of Yankee Stadium, which was published in 2005. In the blurb, Bondy called it "a unique, anthropological view of this most dedicated tribe of rooters—their rituals, their personal tribulations, their uncanny commitment to the Bronx ball club and to each other." The foreword was written by David Cone.

The Bleacher Creatures are what makes that stadium. To have that honor to play right field in front of them every day has been great. I think I've developed a great relationship with them. It's been awesome the way they've really brought in the new stadium and we're having an absolute blast.

— Yankees right fielder Nick Swisher,

In 2009, the Yankees lifted the nine-year alcohol ban in the bleachers in the new Yankee Stadium, where the Bleacher Creatures were relocated to section 203. While no beer vendors come through to the bleachers, fans are permitted to purchase beer in the stadium and take them back to their seats. A few Creatures have admittedly stated they can now desist in their beer smuggling efforts, which they were able to do for years with the help of local delis who used to wrap up sandwiches with beer cans. Other sources of previous alcohol smuggling included "a guy who would sell those airline-size liquor bottles out of a bathroom stall, like a drug dealer" according to the New York Post. An April 2009 segment on ABC World News Tonight revealed that the end of the beer ban is a temporary experiment, and if things get out of hand in the section, the Yankees' management might reinstate it. As of June 29, 2024, alcohol is still permitted in the bleacher sections.

== Chants and songs ==
A prominent aspect of the Bleacher Creatures atmosphere is their use of a variety of chants and songs used during the game that are unique to their section.

=== Roll call ===
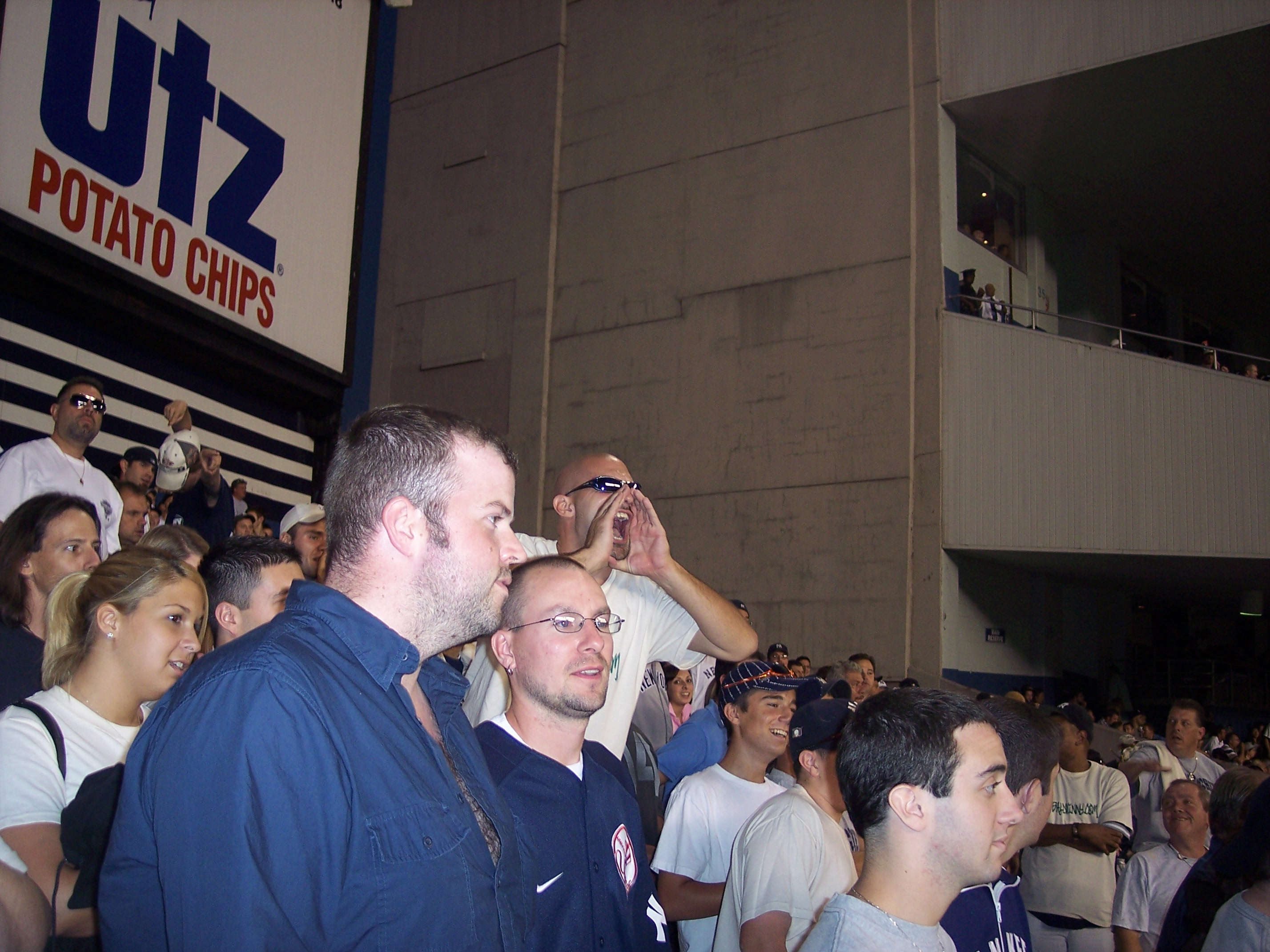
Vinny "Bald Vinny" Milano, calling out the center fielder's name to begin the roll call.

The Creatures' most famous and long-standing chant is known as the roll call. During one game in 1998, the fans, led by Ramirez, started chanting the name of Yankees first baseman Tino Martinez. Martinez responded to the chanting fans with a wave, shocking the cheering fans; this started the tradition of roll call where the Bleacher Creatures chant the name of each starting fielder (except the pitcher and catcher). The roll call starts in the first inning after the pitcher throws the first pitch of the game, with the Creatures chanting the names of Yankees players in the field until the players acknowledge them. Roll call has become one of the trademarks of Yankee Stadium according to sports journalists and publications.

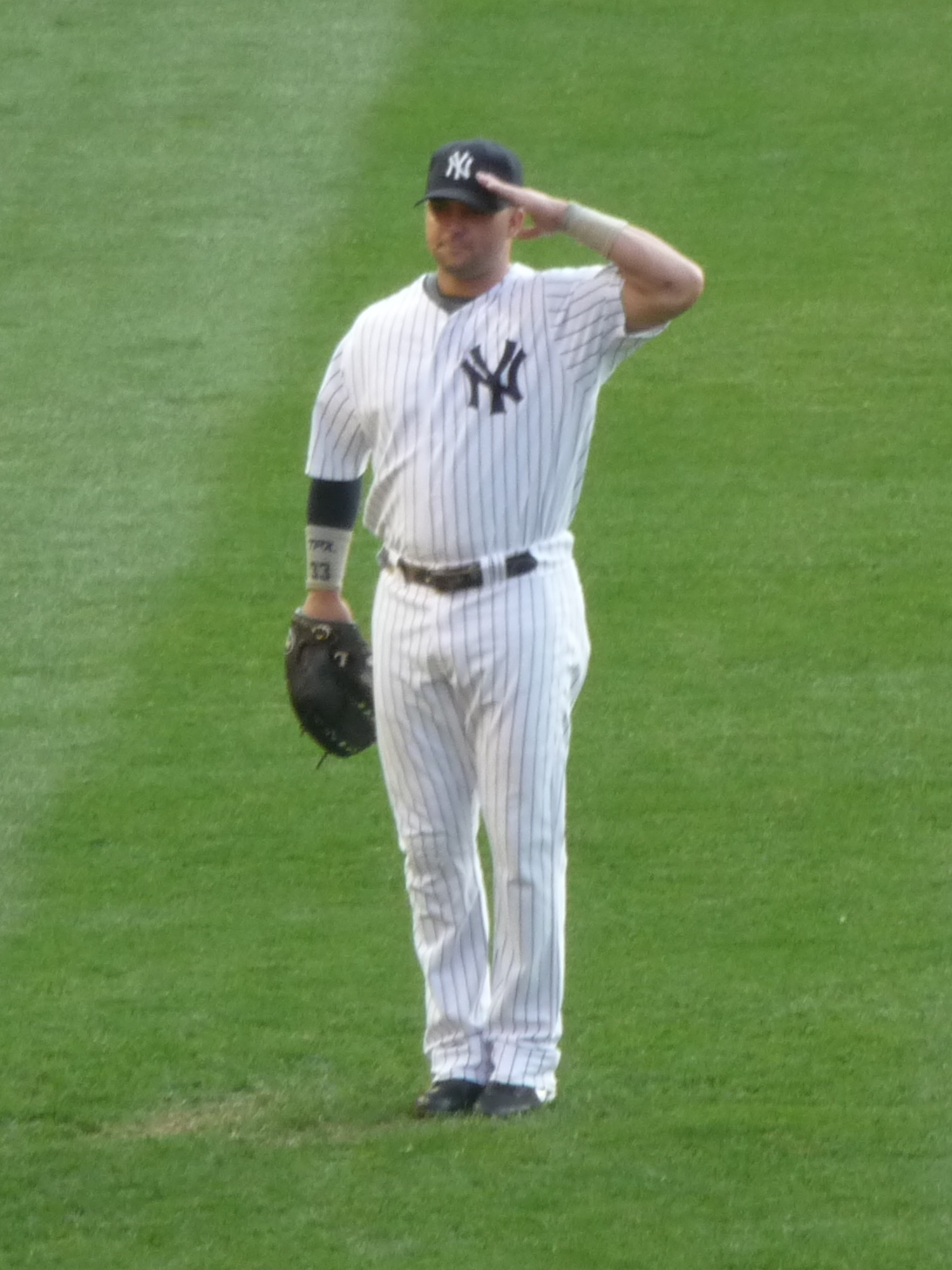
Nick Swisher salutes the Bleacher Creatures during roll call

Former Yankee third baseman Scott Brosius was notorious for not responding immediately to the roll call, as other players on the diamond would. Sometimes he would even wait as long as a minute to respond, getting a kick out of the persistence of the Creatures. In a 2009 press conference, former Yankees first baseman Jason Giambi said that "The biggest thing I miss is (the Bleacher Creatures') roll call. There's no doubt about it, it's the best thing in baseball."

==== Notable exceptions ====
Former or deceased members of the Yankees have been included in chants as well. In 1999, when David Wells made his first appearance at Yankee Stadium after having been traded to the Toronto Blue Jays, his name was chanted. In his tenure with the Yankees, he was the only Yankee pitcher to be included in the roll call every time he pitched. In 2001, some Creatures, led by Japanese Creature, Hiro, learned Japanese so that they could yell obscenities at former Mariners right fielder Ichiro Suzuki. Japanese curses were chanted whenever Ichiro came to town. Ichiro was traded to the Yankees in July 2012. During his first game as a Yankee he was unaware of the roll call and did not respond to the calls. Alfonso Soriano's name was chanted when he made his first appearance after being traded to the Texas Rangers. In the 2006 home opener against the Kansas City Royals, the Bleacher Creatures chanted the name of long-time Yankee outfielder Bernie Williams, who was the designated hitter that day, right after the rest of the defensive lineup. Williams, whose future in baseball was uncertain in the offseason, was in the clubhouse at the time and did not hear the Creatures. The chants continued for around 5 minutes until Williams came out and waved. At the beginning of the 2007 season opener, the Creatures started a chant of "We want Bernie!", a reference to the fact that Williams was no longer with the team.

On May 15, 2011, the Bleacher Creatures chanted Jorge Posada's name after his recent feud with Yankee management, despite Posada not playing in the game. Posada acknowledged them from the dugout. On June 25, 2012, former Yankee center fielder Johnny Damon was greeted by a roll call chant when he returned to Yankee Stadium as a member of the Cleveland Indians. Damon, who played for the Yankees from 2006 to 2009, acknowledged that he may have been the first Yankee player to answer the Bleacher Creature roll call with a signature pose, a tradition continued by other Yankee players, including Nick Swisher, Curtis Granderson, and Brett Gardner. On September 22, 2013, both Andy Pettitte and Mariano Rivera were included in the roll call, despite Pettitte being the starting pitcher and Rivera being a relief pitcher. When Vinny "Bald Vinny" Milano was repeatedly asked, via Twitter, whether the Creatures would still include Alex Rodriguez in the roll call around the time of his struggles and suspension in 2013, Milano insisted that A-Rod would still be part of the roll call and that no Yankee would ever be intentionally skipped.

On July 16, 2010, the Bleacher Creatures elected to not do the roll call out of respect for the recent passing of both public address announcer Bob Sheppard and principal team owner George Steinbrenner. Michael Kay of the YES Network acknowledged this during the top of the first inning during his play-by-play details of the game against the Tampa Bay Rays. The Creatures have done the call in memoriam for former players Phil Rizzuto on August 14, 2007, and Bobby Murcer at the 2008 MLB All Star Game. On June 2, 2021, the Creatures featured Lou Gehrig in the roll call for Lou Gehrig Day, which helped raise funds for the treatment and cure for amyotrophic lateral sclerosis. On August 3, 2024, the creatures featured Don Mattingly while the visiting Toronto Blue Jays were playing a series against the Yankees.

On May 4, 2026, the Creatures honored John Sterling in the roll call, who died earlier that day. (They had also added his name to the call after his abrupt retirement in 2024).

No less than the Creatures were present on the September 14, 2025 game of the Savannah Bananas in Yankee Stadium wherein the Bananas were featured prominently in the roll call.

=== The Cowbell Man ===
After the death of Ali Ramirez, the original Cowbell Man, the bell was given to Milton Ousland in 1996. As the official "Cowbell Man", nobody else is authorized to use it, although it was agreed upon by the group that other Creatures could take over the duties when he couldn't attend. This agreement was reached due to the many fans who were disappointed that the tradition was not carried out at every game. The cowbell is primarily used to initiate a chant during a Yankees rally. The cowbell can be heard throughout the stadium and often on television broadcasts. Ousland stated that the cowbell is a good luck charm, with the team winning their first World Series in almost 20 years after Ousland inherited the cowbell.

I used to get all tensed up when I was younger coming here, but finally I said, 'Hey, it's the same dimensions, the baseball field is the same,' They just get a little rowdy, that's all. I try not to pay attention, but after a while, they're gonna talk to you.

— Mike Cameron, former Mariners center fielder,

=== Other chants and jeers ===
The Creatures also have an assortment of other chants which they use at most games. Anti-obscenity laws were exercised in 2007, but are not always strictly enforced; if they are able, the Creatures will turn to the right field box seats at the completion of the roll call and chant "Box seats suck!" During the days of the bleachers' no-alcohol-sales policy; fans in the right-field box seats occasionally replied with a chant of "We've got beer!" If the Yankees are playing the Red Sox, the intensity of the Yankees – Red Sox rivalry takes hold; the Creatures then cut the 'box seats' chant short and instead chant "Boston sucks!" until that dissipates. Also, until the Red Sox won the World Series in 2004, the Creatures would chant "1918!" and hold up signs saying "CURSE OF THE BAMBINO!" and pictures of Babe Ruth to remind the Red Sox of the last time they won a championship.

== The move to section 203 ==
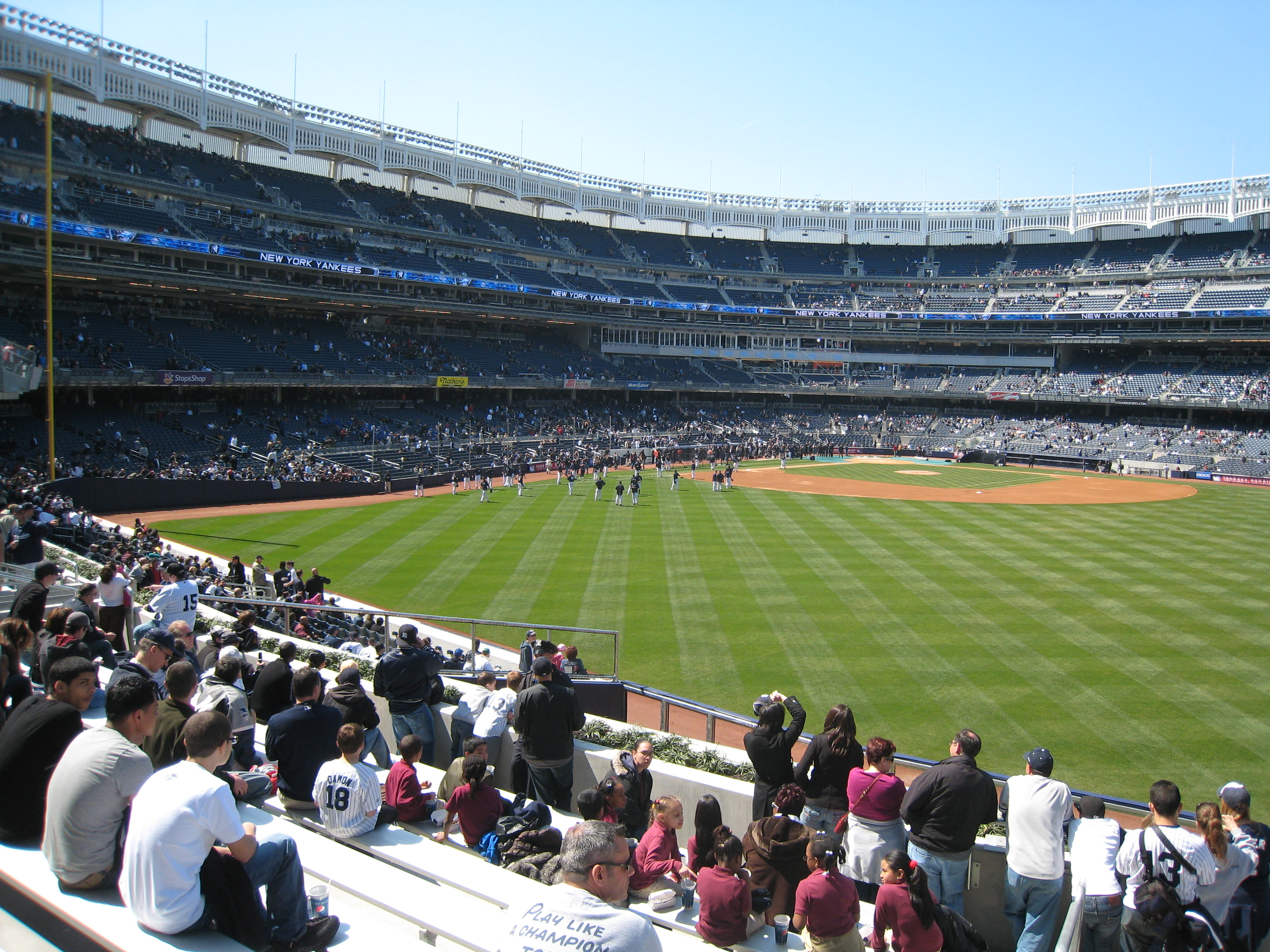
A view of the new Yankee Stadium from the bleachers in 2009

In the new stadium, the Creatures occupy section 203 of the stadium's right field bleachers. Before the start of the 2008 MLB season, several creatures publicly expressed their anger with the move out of the old stadium. Creature Vinny Milano was one of them in particular:

As far as 39 goes next year, there is a right-field bleachers now, there will be a right-field bleachers in the new stadium. When it comes time to pay for our seats, I believe they will offer us something 'comparable' to what we have now and we're pretty much gonna be at their mercy. I have zero faith that anyone that works with or is involved with the Yankees actually cares one way or another if any of us go to the new stadium. Personally, I'm not even sure that I will make the move.

The Yankees organization did work closely with the Creatures to ensure that they sat together again, and designated a total of 136 season-ticket packages for them in section 203. The move was monitored by long-time Creature Teena Lewis, known as the "Queen of the Bleachers", and Marc Chalpin, who organized a list of about 50 Creatures to ensure they would all be sitting together again in the new stadium. Despite the Creatures' concerns over how the Yankees management would handle the move, Lewis said that, "The Yankees helped us because I calmed everybody down over the years. We behaved ourselves, took away some of the chants, and they pretty much paid us back."

Unlike section 39 in the old stadium, section 203 and the rest of the bleachers have access to the entire park. In reference to this new lack of seclusion, and the fact that beer sales are now legal in the section, New York Daily News sports columnist Filip Bondy summed up the new situation by saying, "At this new-fangled stadium, the golden liquid flows like soda and the walls are down that once protected the aristocracy from the bleacher proletariat. This is bound to create some class warfare down the road, some storming of the Legends suites." Bondy also praised the Creatures for "handling the transition with commendable grace and flexibility."

== Controversy and reception ==
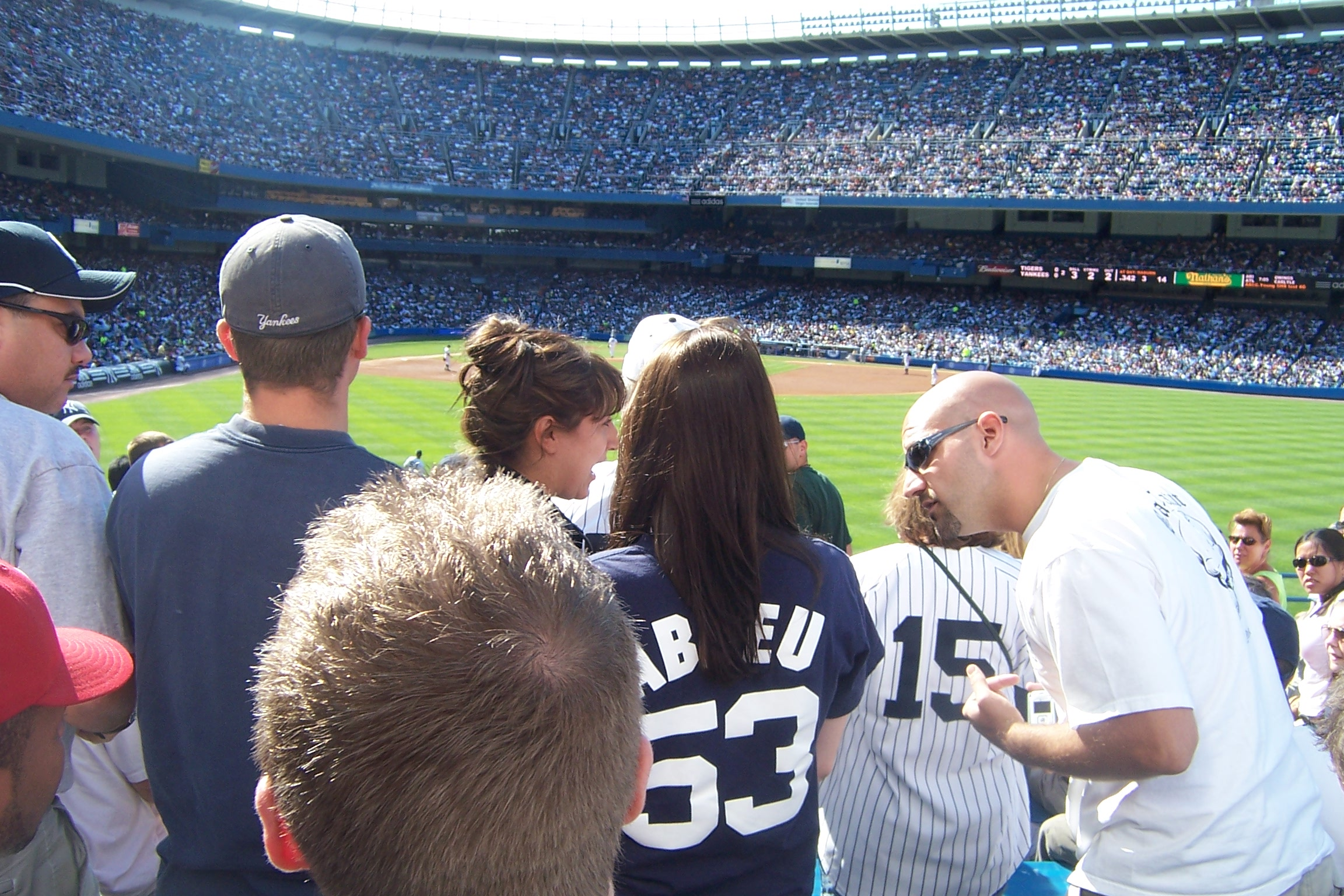
Bleacher Creature members have been known to engage in conflict with non-members, and have sometimes been ejected by NYPD as a result.

Since the inception of the Bleacher Creatures, many people have held a negative viewpoint towards the section for their notorious attitude towards opposing fans and players, and their raucous nature in general. As a result of their rowdiness, the Creatures have been compared to soccer hooligans in Europe. Seattle Post-Intelligencer reporter Dan Raley called the Creatures "oblivious to the outside world. Demanding, relentless and venomous" in a 2001 article. He also claimed that "They have thrown batteries, coins and a knife at opposing players" and that "They throw punches at one another." Longtime stadium usher Michael Swann, who used to work in section 39 of the old stadium, also had a negative recollection of them:

Some are real obnoxious people, some are real foul-mouthed people. Yankee management says if you say certain words and get out of hand, you have to go. But when we try to throw them out, management won't back us. These people won't show us their tickets. They intimidate out-of-towners with tickets into moving to seats somewhere else. They're obnoxious.

On occasion, one or more Creatures have been asked to leave the stadium by police. The bleacher beer ban in 2000 was blamed on the Creatures, which they regard as a false accusation. However, undercover New York City Police Department officers have issued tickets to different Creatures for public intoxication, both in and outside of the stadium. They have also been accused of heckling rattled musicians in high school bands, which they do not deny. In 2022, the Bleacher Creatures were blamed for garbage being thrown at Cleveland Guardians outfielder Oscar Mercado following a Yankees walk-off victory. Earlier in the game Mercado's teammate Myles Straw had a verbal altercation with fans in the left field section As a result, the Yankees increased security around the bleachers section.

During the seventh-inning stretch, "Y.M.C.A." by the Village People is played at the stadium. For many years the Bleacher Creatures would pick a fan of the opposite team and during the singing and instead chant "Why are you gay?" instead of the original song chorus "It's fun to stay at the Y.M.C.A.". After complaints from both fans and the Yankees, several key Bleacher Creatures agreed to discontinue the chant in 2010. Despite the agreement to end the chant, some fans stated some Creatures have continued with the song with no intervention from Yankees personnel.

Comparisons have been made between the Creatures and other fan groups, including The 7 Line Army of the New York Mets, their crosstown rivals. The Creatures have been praised for their loyalty and dedication in numerous articles and features from Filip Bondy, and in his book as well. Bryan Hoch, writing for MLB.com, stated that the Bleacher Creatures, especially roll call, "would remain part of the Stadium experience for years to come". In a 2009 segment, ABC World News Tonight called the Creatures "the most loyal fans any team could want."

== See also ==
- Bleacher Bums
- The 7 Line Army
- Dawg Pound
