= Dawg Pound =

Section of Huntington Bank Field, in Cleveland, Ohio, US

Official logo as of 2015

The Dawg Pound is the name of the bleacher section behind the east end zone in Huntington Bank Field, the home field of the Cleveland Browns, a National Football League (NFL) franchise based in Cleveland, Ohio.

== Formation ==
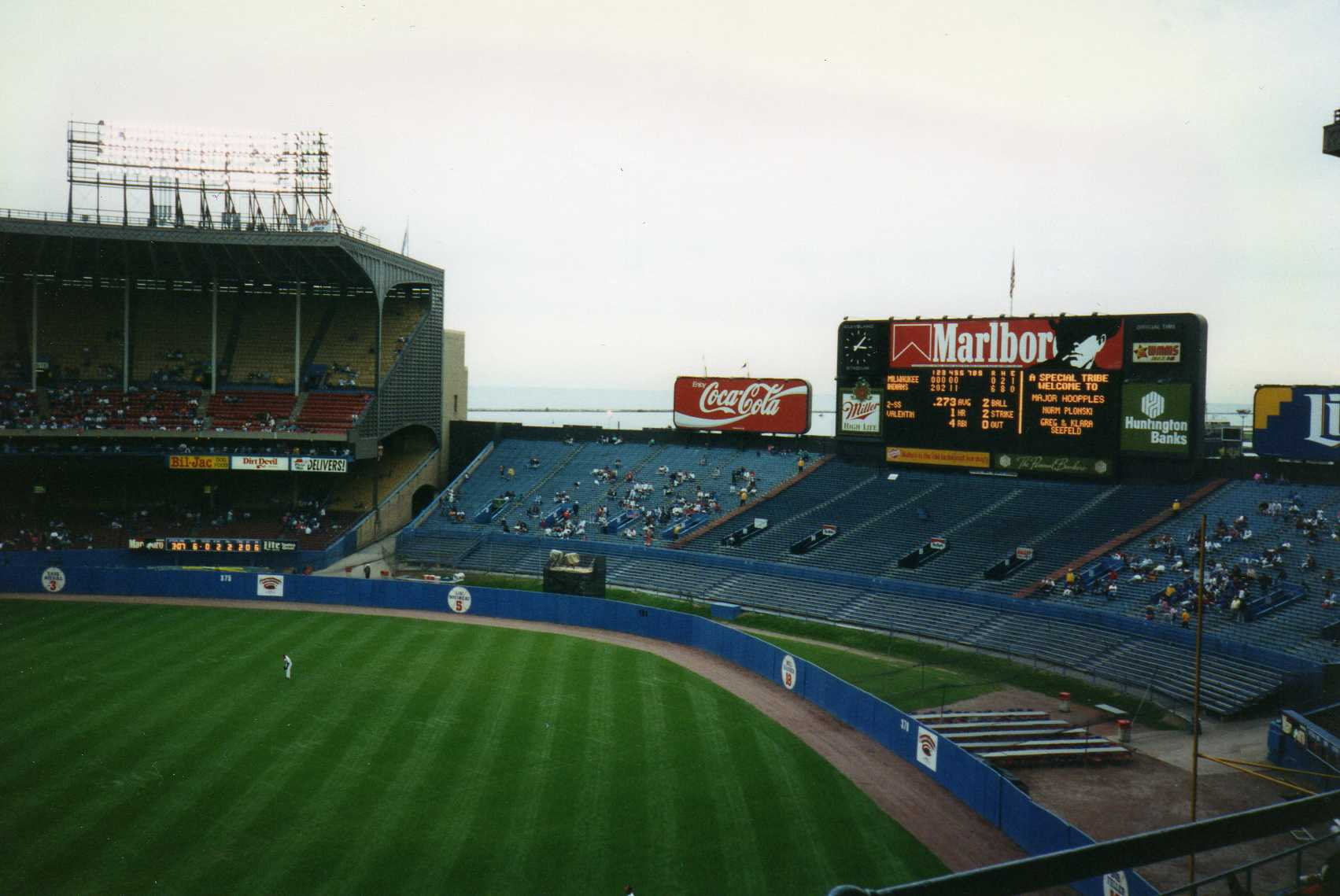
East end zone bleachers at Cleveland Stadium, home to the original Dawg Pound

According to Hanford Dixon, then a cornerback with the Browns, Dixon himself gave his defensive teammates the name "Dawgs" to inspire them before the 1985 season. The Dawg Pound started during the 1985 training camp at Lakeland Community College in Kirtland. Dixon and fellow cornerback Frank Minnifield started the idea of the pound by using the dog-versus-cat relationship between the quarterback and the defense. "We had the idea of the quarterback being the cat, and the defensive line being the dog," Dixon said. "Whenever the defense would get a regular sack or a coverage sack the defensive linemen and linebackers would bark." This attitude carried into the stands at the training camp, where fans started barking along with the players. Dixon and Minnifield then put up the first "Dawg Pound" banner in front of the bleachers before the first preseason game at old Cleveland Stadium. The bleacher section had the cheapest seats in the stadium, and its fans were already known as the most vocal. They adopted their new identity whole-heartedly, wearing dog noses, dog masks, bone-shaped hats and other outlandish costumes.

== Notoriety ==
Dawg Pound fans quickly developed a reputation for misbehavior as well as vociferousness. Team officials banned the carrying of dog food into the stadium, as bleacher fans would shower the visiting team with Milk-Bones, along with eggs, batteries, and other objects. Dawg Pound fans also consumed hefty amounts of alcohol, even sneaking a keg into the stadium inside a doghouse. Their reputation was such that other teams' rowdy fans would often be compared to them—in 1989, when a Cincinnati Bengals game was halted by the throwing of debris at the visiting Seattle Seahawks, Bengals coach Sam Wyche addressed the crowd, angrily reminding them, "You don't live in Cleveland, you live in Cincinnati!"

On at least one occasion, Dawg Pound rowdiness affected the outcome of a game. In the fourth quarter of a 1989 game against the hated Denver Broncos, the rain of batteries, rocks, eggs, and other debris coming down from the bleachers endangered the safety of the players. To move the action away from the east end, referee Tom Dooley had the teams switch sides. That put the wind at the Browns' back. The Browns won on a Matt Bahr field goal that barely cleared the crossbar.

At the final game at Cleveland Stadium in December 1995, fans, including members of the Dawg Pound, ripped the bleachers and seats from the stands, many having brought wrenches, crowbars, and other tools to dislodge the seats. Some fans threw the seats onto the field, while others took them home as souvenirs.

"Here We Go Brownies Here We Go! - Woof! Woof!" is the most common chant heard in the Pound, especially on drives (either offensive or defensive) going towards that end of the field.

== The new pound ==
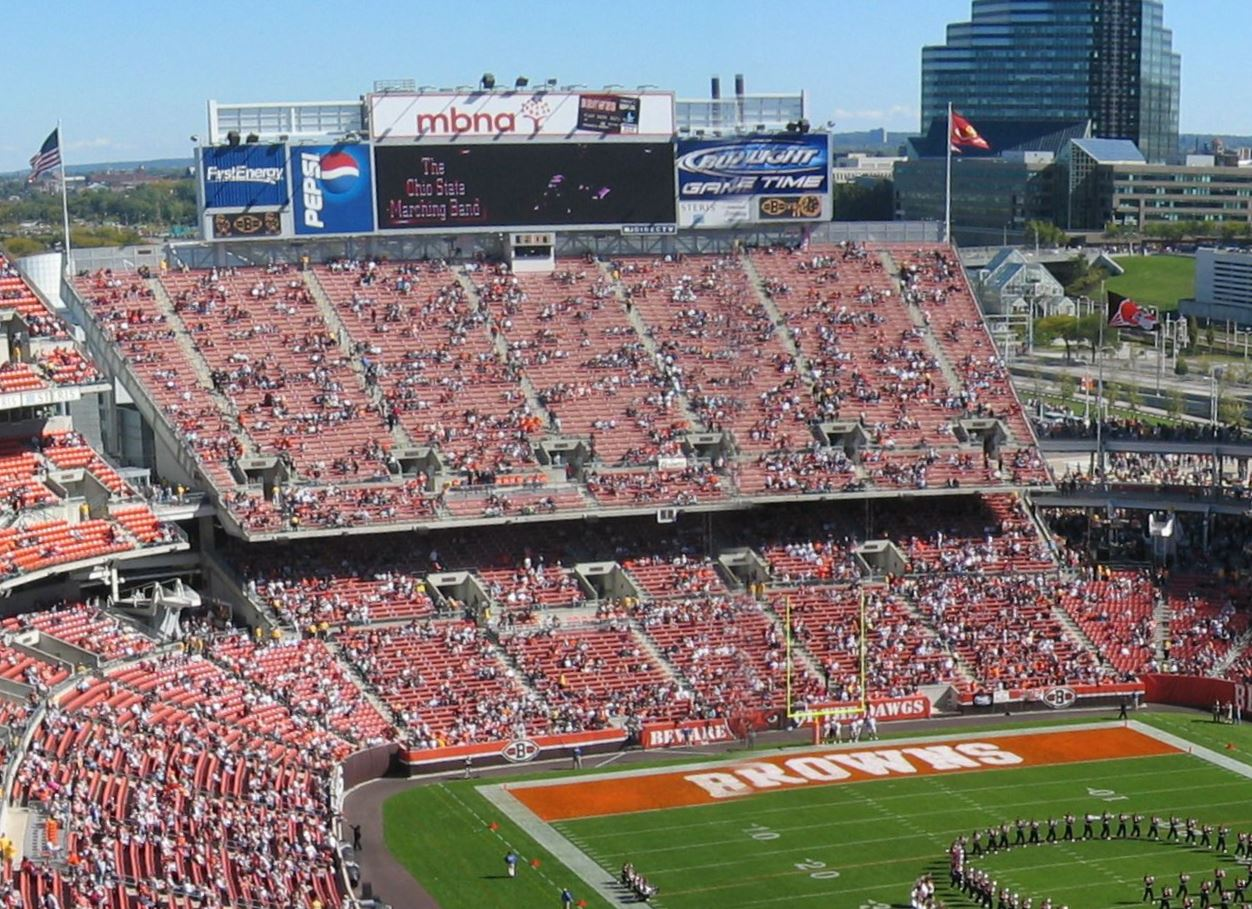
Original configuration, 2006

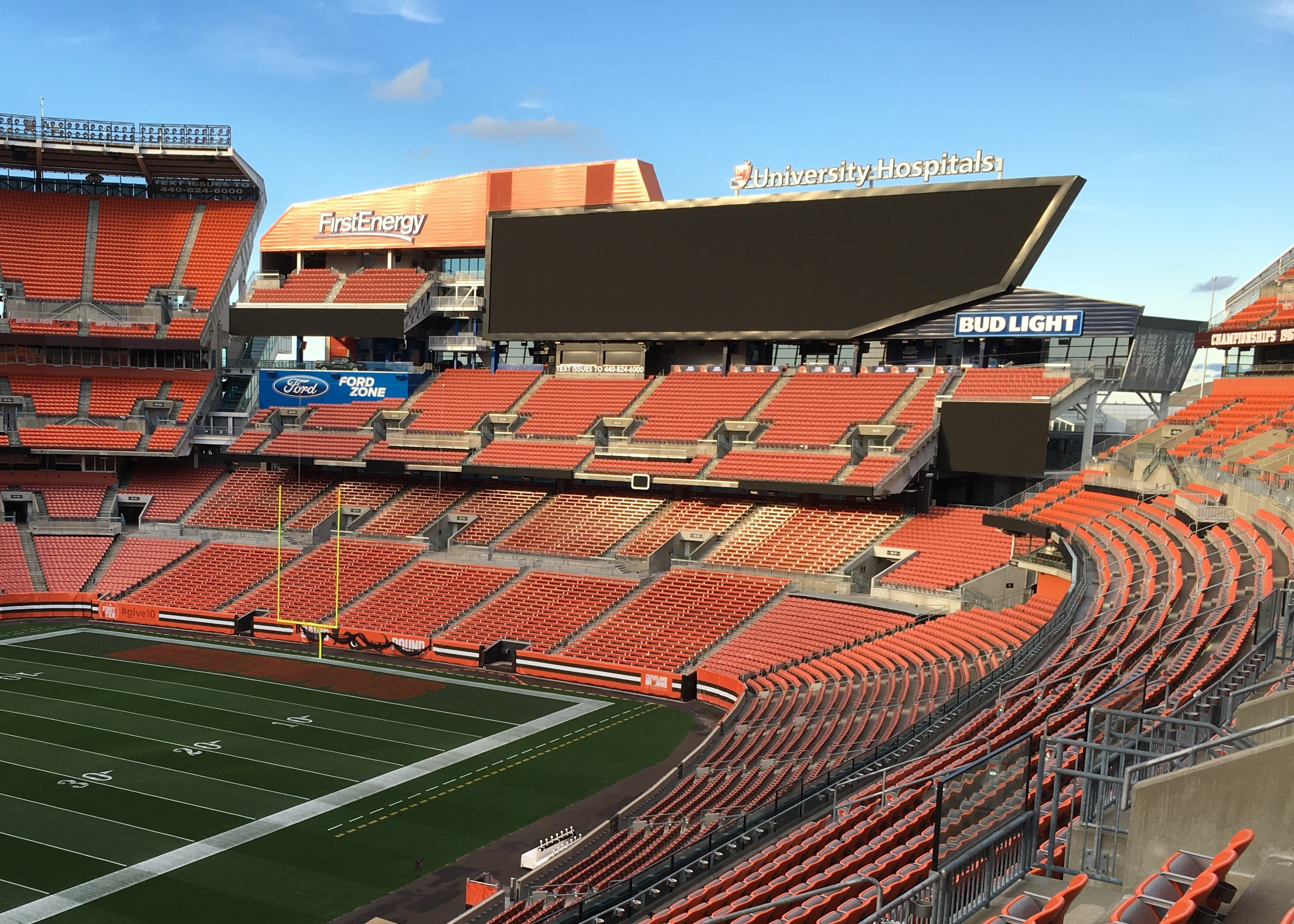
Post-renovation, 2016

Original Dawg Pound logo from the team's return in 1999.

When Huntington Bank Field, then known as Cleveland Browns Stadium was completed in 1999, team officials named the sections in the stadium's east end the Dawg Pound. The new Pound differs from the original in having two decks, but like the Dawg Pound of Cleveland Municipal Stadium, the new stadium's Dawg Pound seats are all bleachers. The Dawg Pound personal seat license was one of the most expensive in the new Stadium.

The new Pound also has official recognition from the team. The team trademarked a Dawg Pound logo, which it uses on select fan memorabilia. This logo was created by NFL Properties and is the only such logo developed for an NFL fan base by the league. It is featured on officially licensed Browns merchandise such as T-shirts, pennants, bumper stickers, etc.

The establishment nature of the new Pound, as well as the more-sterile atmosphere of the new stadium, turned off some veteran fans, especially the old "blue-collar" fan base. This has resulted from what was originally a player and fan movement - the Dawg Pound - having been made "corporate," by the Browns organization, including trademarks, copyrights and an official "Dawg Pound" logo. Also, the more sterile, corporate atmosphere at the new Huntington Bank Field (as opposed to the near anarchy at the old stadium in the 1960s-1990s) has been viewed by more traditionalist Browns fans and Dawg Pound season ticket holders as tarnishing the history and traditional passion of the fanbase.

=== "Bottlegate" ===
In a crucial late-season 2001 game against the Jacksonville Jaguars, the Browns were driving toward the east end zone for what would have been the winning score. A controversial call on fourth down gave the Jaguars the ball. Browns' receiver Quincy Morgan had caught a pass for a first down on 4th and 1. After Tim Couch spiked the ball on the next play, referee Terry McAulay reviewed Morgan's catch, claiming that the replay officials had buzzed him before Couch spiked the ball. (NFL Rules state that once the next play is completed, the officials cannot under any circumstances review any previous plays.) Upon reviewing the play, McAulay determined that Morgan never had control of the ball, thus the pass was incomplete, and the Jaguars were awarded the ball. Fans in the Dawg Pound began throwing plastic beer bottles (a recently introduced concept from the team's beer sponsor, Miller Lite) and other objects on the players and officials. McAulay declared the game over and sent the teams to the locker rooms. NFL Commissioner Paul Tagliabue then called to override the referee's decision, sending the players back onto the field, where the Jaguars ran out the last seconds under a hail of debris. The incident then would become known as "Bottlegate", and resulted in the immediate ban of plastic beer bottles from future Browns home games.

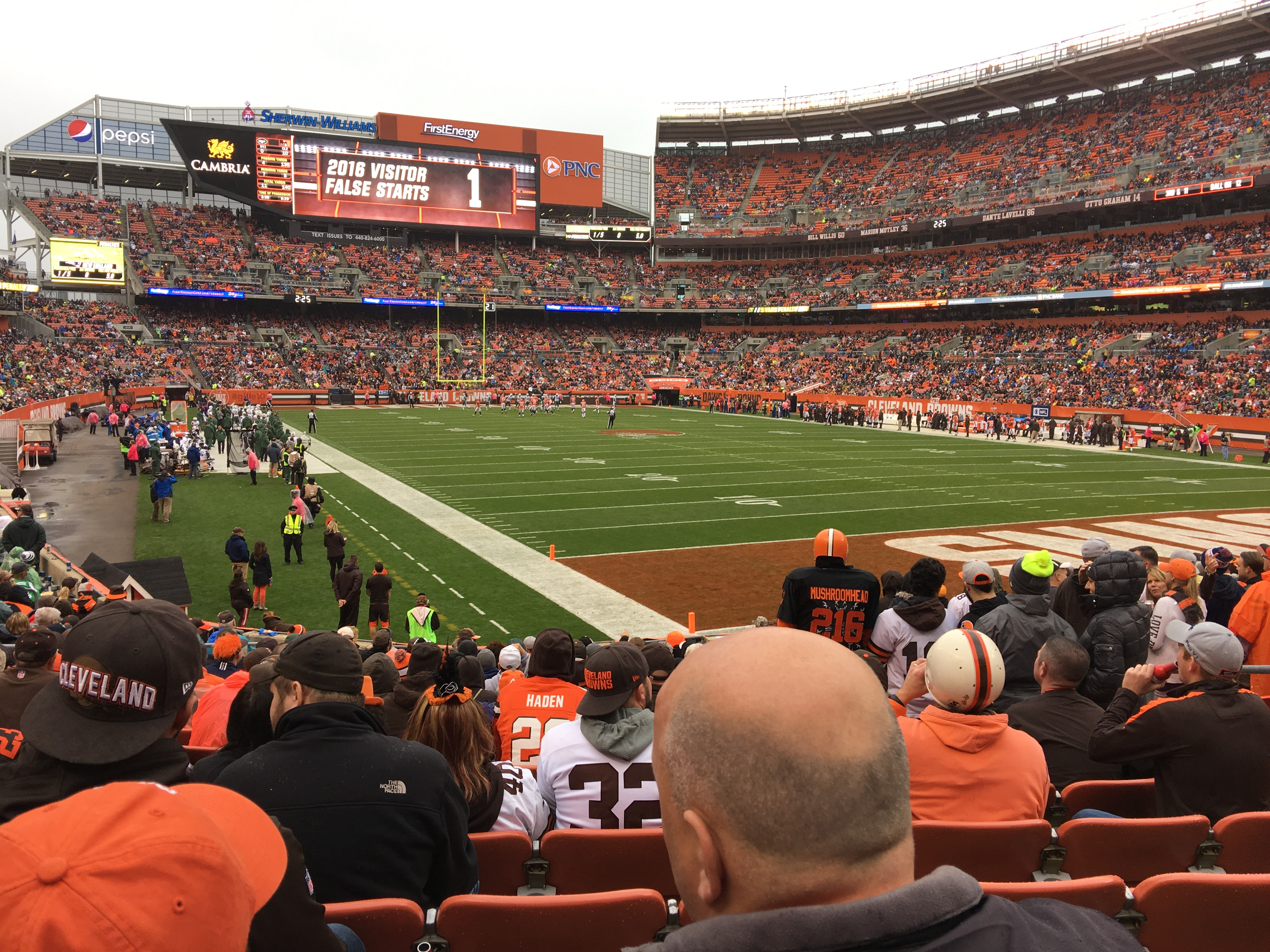
Inside the Dawg Pound during the GPODAWUND game. The banner would be unfurled several rows behind and to the right of the photographer.

=== "GPODAWUND" ===
In October 2016, a group of Browns fans accidentally swapped two parts of a large three-part banner, causing it to read "This is the GPODAWUND." The hashtag #GPODAWUND was then used by fans as a microcosm of what would be a 1–15 season, which was then followed up by a 0–16 2017 season - only the second such record in NFL history - which the fans "celebrated" with a "perfect season" parade around Huntington Bank Field.

== Dawg Pound fans ==
Current ticket prices for the Dawg Pound are $50 per game, and usually require purchase of season tickets. Since construction of the new stadium, the Dawg Pound is populated by more affluent attendees compared to the generally blue collar fan base that made the Municipal Stadium's Dawg Pound famous. Baseball Hall-of-Famer Hank Aaron often attended Browns games at Municipal Stadium and would sit in the Dawg Pound among the fans, albeit incognito.

One of the more famous Dawg Pound season-ticket holders is John Big Dawg Thompson (he had a legal name change to include his nickname), known as the "Canine-in-Chief." Television cameras often showed the offensive-lineman-sized man in his dog mask and No. 98 jersey, although recently he has undergone gastric bypass surgery and lost considerable weight. In 1995, Thompson became an unofficial spokesman for Browns fans fighting the move of the team to Baltimore. He testified before the U.S. House Committee on the Judiciary and appeared on Politically Incorrect with Bill Maher.

Other recognized fans include the Bone Lady (Debra Darnall), Pumpkinhead (Gus Angelone), and The Macho Fan (real name unknown)

== See also ==
- Steeler Nation
- Bleacher Bums
- Bleacher Creatures

== Other sources ==
- Grossi, Tony. Tales From the Browns Sideline, n.p.: Sports Publishing LLC, 2004. ISBN 1-58261-713-9.
- Associated Press (Dec. 17, 2001). "Football Turns Ugly", CBS News.
- Nash, Bruce and Allan Zullo. The Football Hall of Shame 2, New York: Pocket Books, 1990. ISBN 0-671-69413-8.
