= The 7 Line Army =

New York Mets fan group

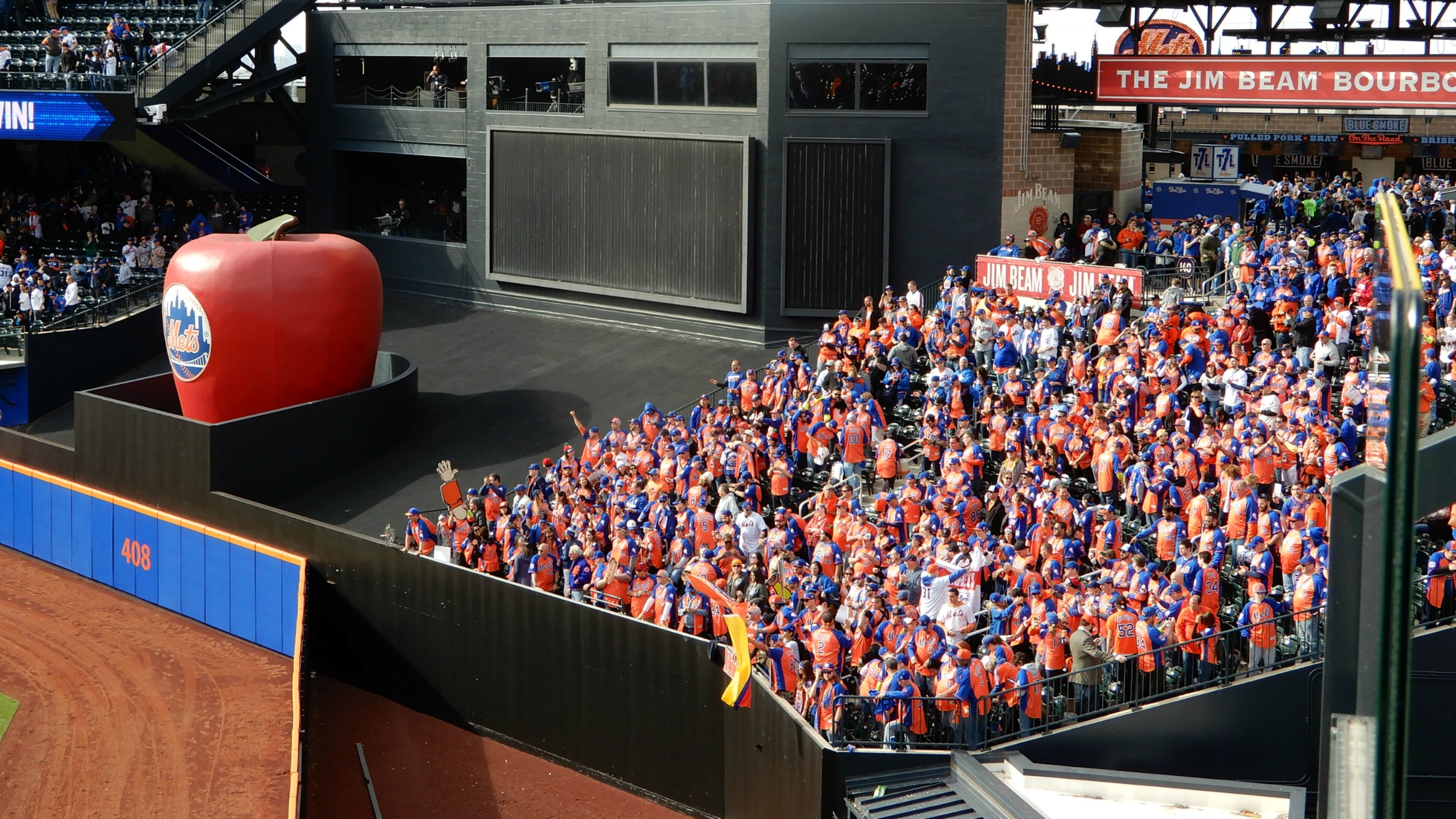
- The 7 Line Army at Citi Field on Opening Day, April 3, 2017
- Named after: 7 (New York City Subway service)
- Formation: September 27, 2012; 14 years ago
- Founded at: Queens, New York City, US
- Purpose: Support the New York Mets baseball team and attend its games
- Website: the7line.com

The 7 Line Army is a group of fans of the New York Mets started in 2012 by Darren Meenan, the founder of The 7 Line, a company that makes Mets-themed apparel. The group is named after the 7 train of the New York City Subway, which stops near Citi Field at Mets–Willets Point. They occupy the Big Apple Reserved section of Citi Field during some Mets home games. The 7 Line Army also attends Mets road games, sponsoring outings which attract more than 1,000 fans.

== History ==
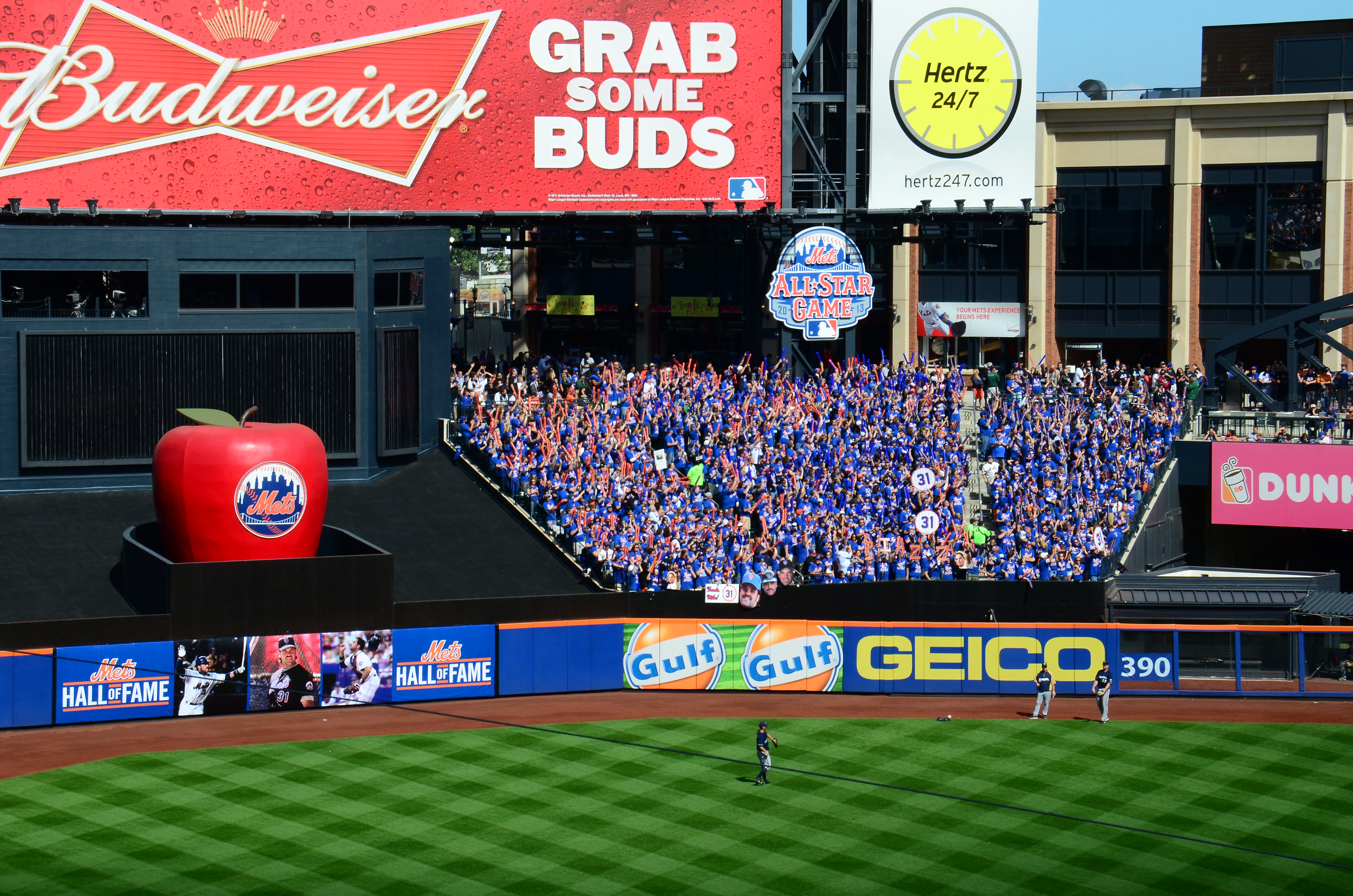
The 7 Line Army attending a Mets game in 2013

The first outing was on September 27, 2012, the final game of the Mets' season. Meenan had the idea to try to host a group outing. He began by purchasing 100 tickets in the Big Apple Reserve section, and then when they sold out, he purchased 100 more, and then 100 more. In the end, he sold 550 tickets to the game. The 7 Line Army filled the 860 seats of the Big Apple Reserve. From there, Meenan began to plan full schedules each year including home and away games. Tickets were sold on The 7 Line website. For each outing from 2012–2015, ticket prices included a customized T-shirt.

The 7 Line Army activities for 2014 included 7 games at Citi Field and outings to see AT&T Park in San Francisco, Marlins Park in Miami, Citizens Bank Park in Philadelphia and Yankee Stadium in the Bronx.

Its participation in 2015 included 9 games at Citi Field and outings at Yankee Stadium in the Bronx, PNC Park in Pittsburgh, Turner Field in Atlanta, Camden Yards in Baltimore and Coors Field in Denver. When the Mets won the division, The 7 Line Army was present at every home postseason game, including the 2015 World Series against the Kansas City Royals.

The 7 Line Army 2016 participation included 14 games at Citi Field and outings at Petco Park in San Diego, Miller Park in Milwaukee, two outings to Nationals Park in Washington, DC, and the fourth annual "Bronx Invasion". In 2016, the Army attended both Subway Series games at Yankee Stadium, instead of just one.

Its participation in 2017 included 14 games at Citi Field and outings at Nationals Park in Washington, DC, Busch Stadium in St. Louis, and Safeco Field in Seattle. They were scheduled to go to Minute Maid Park in Houston, but most did not attend due to Hurricane Harvey.

On July 3, 2019, Mets general manager Brodie Van Wagenen sat with The 7 Line Army through 4 1/2 innings of a game against the New York Yankees. Though the Mets were playing under .500 and fans had expressed their dissatisfaction with the results of offseason trades, Van Wagenen, wearing the group's orange jersey, was welcomed by the fans and signed many autographs.

== Effects ==
Mets players have noted the effect The 7 Line Army has when playing on the road. “It almost felt like we were playing at home, the support the fans are giving us at other ballparks, it feels real good," said pitcher Jacob deGrom.

== See also ==
- Bleacher Creatures
