= Knicks–Nets rivalry =

National Basketball Association rivalry

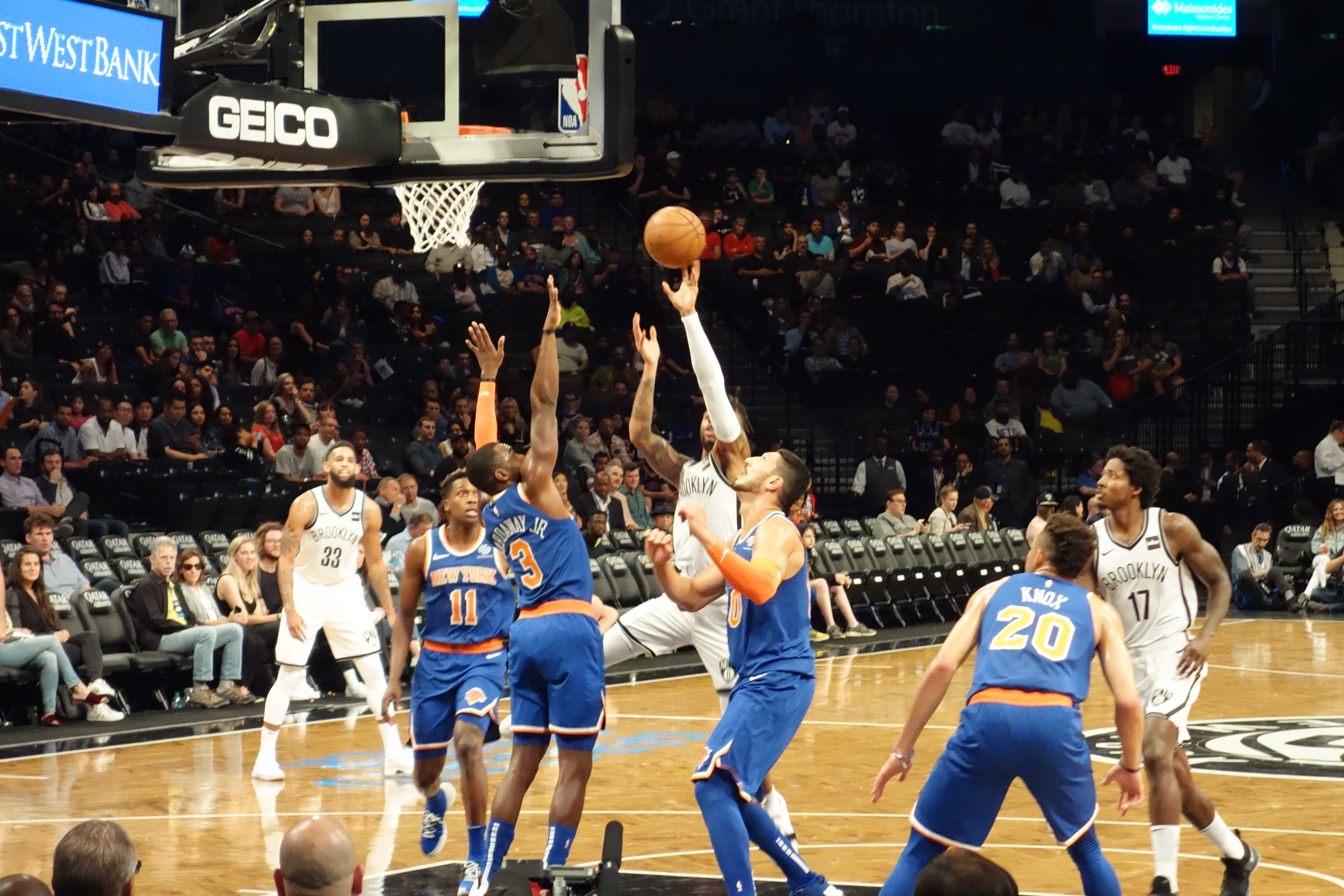
- Nets' D'Angelo Russell shooting over Knicks' Tim Hardaway Jr. in a preseason game at Barclays Center in 2018

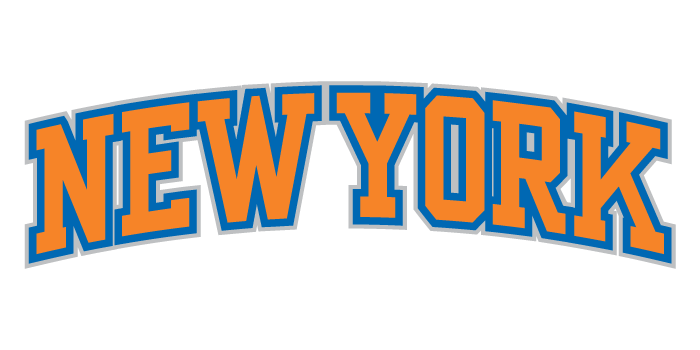
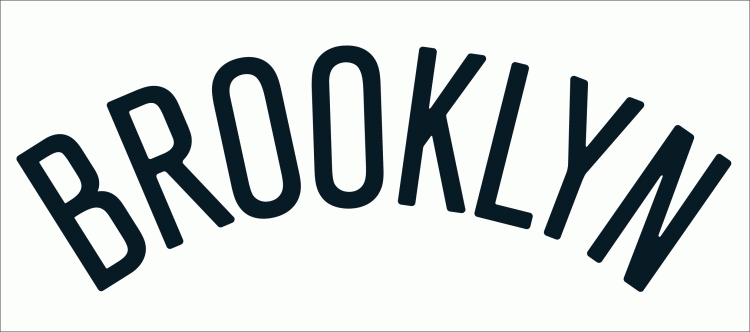
- New York Knicks Brooklyn Nets
- Other names: Battle of New York; Battle of the Boroughs; Clash of the Boroughs
- Location: New York City
- First meeting: November 30, 1976; Nets 104, Knicks 103
- Latest meeting: November 2, 2026; Knicks 103, Nets 90
- Next meeting: December 27, 2026

Statistics
- Total meetings: 233
- All-time series: 121–112 (NYK)
- Regular season series: 116–107 (NYK)
- Postseason results: 5–5 (tied)
- Largest victory: January 21, 2026; Knicks 120, Nets 66
- Longest win streak: NYK W15
- Current win streak: NYK W15

Postseason history
- 1983 first round: Knicks won, 2–0; 1994 first round: Knicks won, 3–1; 2004 first round: Nets won, 4–0

The Knicks–Nets rivalry is a crosstown rivalry between New York City's two National Basketball Association (NBA) teams: the New York Knicks and Brooklyn Nets. Both teams compete in Atlantic Division of the Eastern Conference. The New York Knicks were established in 1946 as one of the charter franchises of the NBA, and have been based at Madison Square Garden in Midtown Manhattan since 1968. The Nets were established in 1967 as a member of the now-defunct American Basketball Association, and joined the NBA in 1976. They have been based at Barclays Center in Brooklyn since 2012, though have played in the New York metropolitan area their entire existence.

The rivalry began in 1976 when the Nets joined the NBA as part of the ABA–NBA merger. At the time, the team was known as the New York Nets and played at Nassau Veterans Memorial Coliseum in suburban Long Island. The team became the New Jersey Nets the following season when they relocated to suburban New Jersey, playing temporarily in Piscataway at Rutgers University before moving to Brendan Byrne Arena in East Rutherford in 1981, their home until 2010. The Nets played their final two seasons in New Jersey at Prudential Center in downtown Newark. The rivalry became an intra-city series when the Nets relocated to Brooklyn in 2012.

When the Nets played in New Jersey, the rivalry had several nicknames, including the Turnpike Classic, The Function at the Junction, Battle of the Hudson River, and The War Between the States.

After the Nets' move to Brooklyn, due to the close proximity of the two teams and the overall histories of Brooklyn and Manhattan, media outlets have dubbed the rivalry the Battle of New York, Battle of the Boroughs, or Clash of the Boroughs. The two teams have met in the playoffs three times over the course of their history, with the most recent meeting in 2004.

== History ==
=== 1966–1977: Beginnings ===
The Knicks and Nets have generally been antagonistic to each other since the beginnings of the Nets franchise. The Nets were originally established in 1966 as a founding member of the American Basketball Association (ABA), to be named the New York Americans, and league had intended for the team to play at the 69th Regiment Armory in Manhattan. The Knicks of the older NBA forced the Armory to back out three months before opening day, forcing the Nets to be left scrambling for a venue with opening day approaching, and it finally settled on the Teaneck Armory in Teaneck, New Jersey. The Nets would continue to be a transient franchise for the remainder of their time in the ABA, unable to establish a permanent home in the Tri-State area until 1972, when they became the basketball tenant of the Nassau Veterans Memorial Coliseum in Uniondale, New York.

Upon their transfer to the NBA from the ABA due to the ABA–NBA merger in 1976, the then New York Nets, were cited for "encroaching" on the Knicks' New York City territory at the Nassau Coliseum, and were forced to pay an encroachment fee of US$4.8 million to the Knicks. This fee, along with the NBA expansion fee, made it financially impossible for the Nets, who were the ABA champions in 1976, to retain superstar Julius Erving. The Nets were forced to sell Erving to the Philadelphia 76ers in order to meet their financial obligations, and this move sent the team to a period of mediocrity that took them years to recover from.

When the Nets decided to move back to the state of New Jersey in 1977, the Knicks once again became an obstacle and threatened to block the move because it would infringe on their exclusive territorial rights to New Jersey. The Nets responded by suing the Knicks on the basis that their actions violated anti-trust laws. The lawsuit was settled between the teams after the league and the state of New Jersey intervened, and the Nets agreed to pay another $4 million to the Knicks for the rights to move.

=== 1977–2012: New York vs. New Jersey ===
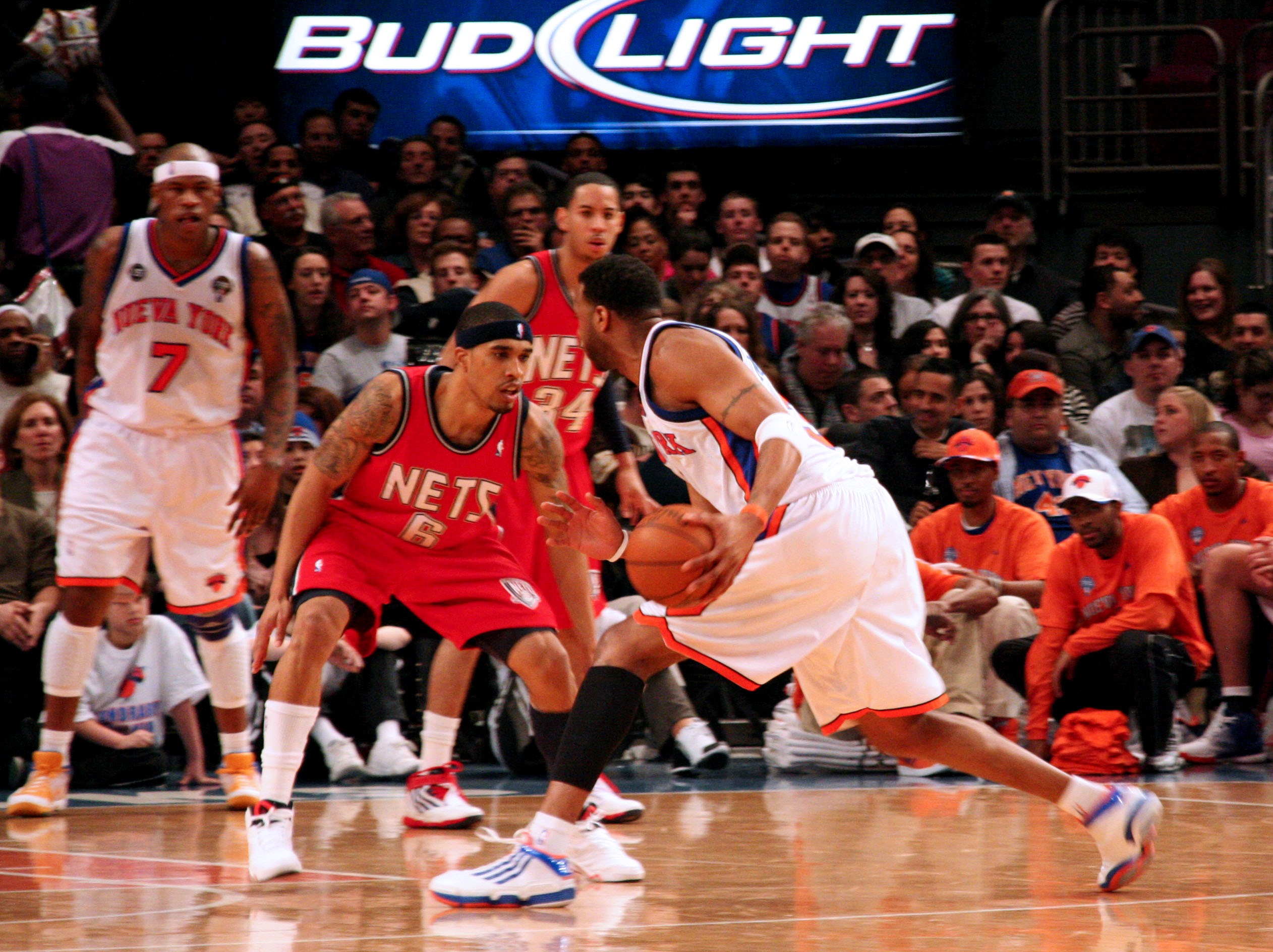
Courtney Lee defending Tracy McGrady during a game at Madison Square Garden in 2010.

Between 1977 and 2012, the Nets played in the state of New Jersey as the New Jersey Nets. During that time, the Knicks generally received more media coverage regardless of team records, despite both teams playing in the New York market. When the Knicks traveled to New Jersey to play the Nets, the arena was often evenly split between fan bases. This was partly because the two teams were separated by only the Hudson River; however, a contributing factor was that tickets in New Jersey were comparatively cheaper than those sold at Madison Square Garden. The atmosphere was often tense amongst fan bases trying to establish control of home court advantage.

For most of their respective histories during this period, the Nets and Knicks had traded dominance in the New York area, with the Nets' most successful years occurring in the early 1980s and early 2000s, while the Knicks' biggest success mostly occurring from the late 80s to the late 90s. The teams would meet in the first round of the 1983 NBA playoffs and 1994 NBA playoffs, with the Knicks easily defeating the Nets in both cases.

The rivalry began to heat up in the early 2000s. With the trade of Stephon Marbury to the Suns for Jason Kidd, the Nets became the class of the Eastern Conference in 2001. Due to the long-noted discrepancy in media coverage between the New York and New Jersey ball clubs, upon being signed, Kidd promised the Nets would no longer play second fiddle to the Knicks.

The rivalry was again turned up a notch, when New York native Stephon Marbury, the once-vilified point guard in New Jersey who was traded for Kidd, was traded to the Knicks in 2004. Marbury and Kidd had their own rivalry, with Kidd being the consensus best-point-guard-in-the-league and Marbury declaring himself the league's best point guard. The two stars who had once been traded for one another now found each other on opposite sides of an intense rivalry and their respective teams were motivated to prove their supremacy in the metropolitan area. Some members of the Knicks went so far as to say that they wanted to face New Jersey (the reigning two-time Eastern Conference champion at the time) in the playoffs. The Nets swept the Knicks in the first round of the 2004 playoffs. The series included a highly publicized spat between the Knicks' Tim Thomas and Nets' Kenyon Martin, in which Thomas all but challenged Martin to a fight and called him "fugazi."

=== 2012–present: New York vs. Brooklyn ===
After buying the Nets in 2010, Mikhail Prokhorov took frequent jabs at the Knicks and their ownership. He stated that he wished to "turn Knicks fans into Nets fans" when the team relocated, and that he was happy the Nets caused the Knicks to "overpay" for Carmelo Anthony (by increasing their own offers in the "Carmelo Sweepstakes").

Both sides have begun marketing in earnest throughout Manhattan and Brooklyn, often proclaiming they are the sole "team of the borough" with billboards displaying their newly acquired superstars, Carmelo Anthony and Deron Williams. One of the first moves of Prokhorov's ownership of the Nets in 2010 was to purchase a large 225-by-99-foot (69 m × 30 m) painted billboard, featuring himself, then Nets part-owner Jay-Z and the words "Blueprint for Greatness" on the side of a building at 34th Street and Eighth Avenue facing Madison Square Garden, home of the Knicks. The Knicks responded to the Nets' marketing push with a television commercial stating, "You can walk like us, you can talk like us, but you ain't never gonna be like us." This prompted Prokhorov to respond: "I think we'd more like to be like the Lakers [winners of 16 NBA championships]." Marty Markowitz, the former borough president of Brooklyn, has derisively called the Knicks the "Manhattan Knicks" and claimed that any Brooklynite who supported the Knicks was committing "treason".

The trash talking between the two teams, including personal insults such as the 6 ft 9 in (2.06 m) Prokhorov calling Knicks owner James Dolan "that little man", reached a point where NBA commissioner David Stern felt the need to arrange a meeting between Knicks owner James Dolan and Brooklyn Nets owner Mikhail Prokhorov to lessen the tensions between the two.

== Comparisons ==
Media outlets have noted the rivalry's similarity to those of other New York City teams, such as Major League Baseball's Subway Series rivalry between the American League's New York Yankees and National League's New York Mets due to the teams' proximity through the New York City Subway. Historically, the boroughs of Manhattan and Brooklyn competed via the Dodgers–Giants rivalry, when the two teams were known as the Brooklyn Dodgers and New York Giants. Like the Knicks and Nets, the Giants and Dodgers played in Manhattan and Brooklyn, respectively, and were fierce divisional rivals. The rivalry between the New York Islanders and New York Rangers of the National Hockey League shared this crosstown rivalry from 2015 to 2020 when the Islanders played at the Barclays Center. The Hudson River Derby of Major League Soccer is also similar in terms of being crosstown New York City sporting rivals, however, New York City FC play in the Bronx and the New York Red Bulls play in Harrison, New Jersey, not Brooklyn or Long Island; although New York City FC has, at some occasions, played at Red Bull Arena in 2020 and 2021 due to scheduling conflicts with Yankee Stadium and even winterization procedures.

== See also ==
- List of NBA rivalries
- Giants–Jets rivalry
- Islanders–Rangers rivalry
- Devils–Rangers rivalry
- Subway Series
  - Mets–Yankees rivalry
- Hudson River Derby
