= Giants–Jets rivalry =

National Football League rivalry in New York City

- New York Giants New York Jets
- Location: New York City; East Rutherford, New Jersey
- First meeting: November 1, 1970; Giants 22, Jets 10
- Latest meeting: October 29, 2023; Jets 13, Giants 10 (OT)
- Next meeting: TBD (no later than 2027 regular season)
- Stadiums: Giants/Jets: MetLife Stadium

Statistics
- Total meetings: 15
- All-time series: Giants: 8–7–0
- Largest victory: Giants: 29–14 (2011); Jets: 26–7 (1981)
- Longest win streak: Giants: 5 (1996–2011); Jets: 3 (2015–present)
- Current win streak: Jets: 3 (2015–present)

The Giants–Jets rivalry is a National Football League (NFL) rivalry between the New York Giants and New York Jets.

It is an intra-city, interconference matchup between the two NFL teams based in the New York metropolitan area. Since 1984, both clubs have shared a home stadium — Giants Stadium (from 1984 to 2009) and MetLife Stadium (since 2010). Thus, a Giants–Jets game can be referred to as "the shortest road trip in the league". It can also be referred to as a "sibling rivalry" since both teams play at and share the stadium.

As the teams play in different conferences, the two teams only meet during the regular season once every four years, with their designated home games rotating every eight years, when the entire AFC East and NFC East are paired up against each other. However, beginning with the 2021 NFL season, an extra inter-conference game was created based on division rank and rotation cycle two years prior, In addition to annual preseason matchups, the only other way the two teams would meet would be in the Super Bowl, which has never occurred.

The Giants lead the overall series, 8–7. The two teams have not met in the playoffs.

== History ==
The New York Jets previously maintained a very tense rivalry with their in-town counterparts, the New York Giants, a rivalry that has since diminished due to the infrequency with which the teams meet in the regular season. Since the two teams play each other so infrequently in the regular season, some, including players on both teams, have questioned whether the Giants and Jets have a real rivalry.

Its origins can be traced back to the formation of the American Football League in 1960, as a rival to the more established NFL. The upstart league decided to directly compete with the NFL's Giants, and granted a charter franchise to Harry Wismer, who proclaimed that New York was ready for another professional football team. Like the AFL and the NFL, their respective teams in New York fought for publicity, attention and fans. In 1965, New York City Council member Matthew Troy filed a resolution for Mayor Robert F. Wagner Jr. to ask the Giants and Jets to play a game "for the benefit of sandlot", styling it after the Mayor's Trophy of the Mets–Yankees rivalry at the time.

=== First preseason games ===
However, the Jets and Giants did not actually play each other until a preseason game at the Yale Bowl in New Haven, Connecticut, on August 17, 1969, in the lead up to the AFL–NFL merger. Giants' owner Wellington Mara had held up the merger until the Jets paid $10 million of "indemnity money." Despite being played at a neutral site in another market entirely, the game was viewed as a "turf war" by both opponents. The Giants, considered a mediocre team at the time which had struggles finding a permanent home through the 60s and mid-70s (thus using the Yale Bowl as a home stadium), were regarded as underdogs and were under much scrutiny by the media and their fans. The Jets on the other hand were coming off a win in Super Bowl III as the first AFL team to win an AFL-NFL Championship Game. Ultimately, the Jets won 37–14, resulting in a rare preseason firing of a head coach, in Giants coach Allie Sherman. The teams have played in the preseason annually since.

Though the annual preseason game still served as a mild opportunity for bragging rights, the fervor of the rivalry had begun to fade by 1979. It weakened even further in 1990, when the Jets fired Joe Walton, a former player and coach for the Giants who had other former Giants on his staff. Another reason is that because the Jets and the Giants are in different conferences, they have only met in the regular season 11 times since the 1970 AFL–NFL merger. Under the league's current scheduling formula, in use since 2002, the two New York teams only met every four years, and can only meet in the postseason if they both advance to the Super Bowl.

Since the teams' move to MetLife Stadium, their annual preseason matchup has colloquially been referred to as the "Snoopy Bowl", in reference to MetLife having formerly used the Peanuts character as its mascot. A trophy, called the MetLife Trophy or Snoopy Trophy, was also awarded to the winner during the 2010s.

=== First regular season games ===
The first regular season meeting between the two teams came in the first full post-merger season, 1970, in which the Giants beat the Jets 22–10 at the Jets' home field of Shea Stadium on November 1. The Jets' entire starting backfield of quarterback Joe Namath and running backs Emerson Boozer and Matt Snell had to miss the game due to injuries. The game was marked by a fight in the third quarter. With the Jets leading 10–3, the Jets' defense stopped the Giants on a fourth down play near the Jets' goal line. Giants quarterback Fran Tarkenton became angered and threw the ball at Jets' linebacker Larry Grantham, which led to a fight between Jets' cornerback Earlie Thomas and Giants' cornerback Kenny Parker. Shortly after the fight, the Giants scored 2 points on safety, the first of 16 points they scored in less than 2 minutes leading to their victory. Mara stated after the game that "You've got to be champions of your own neighborhood before you try to conquer the world."

The second regular season meeting between the two teams, and the first Giants' home game, was played on November 10, 1974, at the Yale Bowl in New Haven, Connecticut. The Giants' historic home field of Yankee Stadium was being renovated so the Giants were playing home games at the Yale Bowl. Both teams had losing records going into the game – the Giants were 2–6, the Jets were 1–7 – making the local rivalry one of the few points of importance. The game was not televised in New York. Under the rules then in effect, if a game was not sold out by Thursday afternoon, the game would be blacked out from being shown on television in the home market. Although the teams could waive the blackout, Mara refused to do so because he believed it would be unfair to Giants' fans who made the trip to New Haven to find out that they could have watched the game in New York without traveling.

The Jets won that game in overtime. It was the first regular season game decided in sudden death in NFL history, under a new overtime rule that was put in place for the 1974 season. The Giants were leading 20–13 in the fourth quarter, when Jets' quarterback Joe Namath ran for a touchdown despite his bad knees – Namath's first rushing touchdown since 1969 – tying the score with the extra point kicked by Pat Leahy. After the Giants missed a field goal in overtime, which placekicker Pete Gogolak thought was good, Namath threw the winning touchdown pass to Boozer. This was the first game played by Leahy, who replaced an injured Bobby Howfield and went on to become the Jets' all-time leading scorer (and retired as the 3rd all-time leading scorer in NFL history).

=== The Jets join the Giants in the same stadium ===
When the Jets left Shea Stadium and moved to Giants Stadium for the 1984 NFL season, many Jets fans assumed the name would be changed. However the Giants, who did not own the stadium but nevertheless had the authority to approve any change, vetoed any name change. They refused to reconsider, even as the sale of naming rights in other venues became increasingly common and lucrative. The Jets resisted making references to the stadium by its official name, instead calling it "The Meadowlands". The naming of the stadium has played a role in the rivalry, as the Giants overshadowed the Jets. Over the 26 years since the Jets were accepted into their NFC counterpart's home field, the unexpected and time-tested partnership of both teams have only gotten stronger in spite of the big sibling rivalry, resulting in both teams now sharing MetLife Stadium, a joint-venture in which the two franchises own a fifty percent share.

=== Critical games ===
The Jets met the Giants in 1988 during the final game of the regular season. The Jets, with a 7–7–1 record, had little to lose as their hopes for playoff contention had vanished. The Giants, however, were contending for a playoff spot and a victory would have secured their spot and their division title. Although the six point favorites, the Giants were unable to overcome the Jets defense which saw the Jets sack quarterback Phil Simms eight times. With the Jets' victory and victories by the Los Angeles Rams and Philadelphia Eagles, the Giants were eliminated from playoff contention and the Jets gained what many considered respect.

On December 6, 2015, the Jets and Giants played in MetLife Stadium with Giants as the official home team. The Jets entered the game with a 6–5 record, desperately chasing an AFC wildcard spot, while the Giants entered with a 5–6 record and were fighting for first place in the NFC East. The Giants had won the last five meetings between the clubs, and the last two were critical for the Giants' championship runs. After each teams started with one failed possession the Jets led a 78-yard drive with several strong runs by Chris Ivory and finished with a field goal. A couple of possessions later in the second quarter as both teams were stagnant on offense Dwayne Harris returned a Jets punt for an 80-yard touchdown. On the Jets' next possession Chris Ivory fumbled the ball in the Jets' red zone but the Giants failed to capitalize and only got a field goal out of the opportunity. The Jets had another strong drive that ended with a 25-yard touchdown pass from Ryan Fitzpatrick to Bilal Powell. Giants star wide receiver Odell Beckham Jr. caught a 72-yard touchdown pass on the next Giants drive to take a 17–10 lead. The Giants got another field goal before the end of the half and entered the locker room up by 10. The Giants led an 11-minute drive in the third–fourth quarter. On fourth down on the Jets' four-yard line the Giants controversially attempted to go for the touchdown rather than take a short field goal and threw an interception. The Jets marched down to the Giants' redzone but settled for a field goal. The Jets got the ball back again with two minutes and all of their timeouts remaining, and marched efficiently down the field until Fitzpatrick threw a touchdown pass to Brandon Marshall to tie the game. The teams squared off in overtime. The Jets got the ball first and continued their stellar offensive play from the fourth quarter and scored a short field goal. The Giants got within field goal range to the Jets 30-yard line on their drive, and Josh Brown missed the 48-yarder, his first missed field goal of the year. The Jets beat the Giants for the first time since 1993.

=== Super Bowl wins by the Giants in 2007 and 2011 ===
During the victory parade for the Giants, celebrating their win in Super Bowl XLII over the Jets division rivals, the New England Patriots, New Jersey government officials took jabs. State Senate President Richard J. Codey took a jab at the Patriots when he referred to their videotaping scandal at Giants Stadium against the Jets in September. "If the Patriots were here today, they could film all they want", Codey said.

Jets coach Rex Ryan made an effort to fuel the flames of the rivalry. The 2011 season matchup, which both teams needed to win to keep their respective playoff hopes alive, was hyped up by trash talking from both teams including comments by Ryan. Just before their December 24, 2011 meeting, the "host" Jets covered up the "visiting" Giants' Super Bowl logos in front of their locker room, angering Giants players. The Giants defeated the Jets 29–14, highlighted by a 99-yard touchdown pass from Giant quarterback Eli Manning to Victor Cruz, which gave the Giants their first lead of the game that they never relinquished. After the game, Giants running back Brandon Jacobs taunted Ryan, saying, "Time to shut up, fat boy!" The two reportedly came close to blows in a tense post-game meeting. The Giants win over the Jets eliminated the Jets from the playoffs and helped the Giants secure the NFC East title and a spot in the playoffs, where they would go on to win Super Bowl XLVI, once again by defeating the New England Patriots. Giants kicker Lawrence Tynes called the win over the Jets the turning point of the season that spurred them onto their Super Bowl run. Despite a Super Bowl that was described as a "lose-lose situation" for the Jets as their cross-town rivals played against their division rivals, Jets owner Woody Johnson congratulated both the Giants and Patriots in a post-game statement.

== Game results ==
Season	Date	Home team	Site	Result	Overall series
1970	November 1	Jets	Shea Stadium	Giants 22–10	Giants 1–0
1974	November 10	Giants	Yale Bowl	Jets 26–20 (OT)	Tied 1–1
1981	November 1	Giants	Giants Stadium	Jets 26–7	Jets 2–1
1984	December 2	Jets	Giants Stadium	Giants 20–10	Tied 2–2
1987	December 27	Giants	Giants Stadium	Giants 20–7	Giants 3–2
1988	December 18	Jets	Giants Stadium	Jets 27–21	Tied 3–3
1993	October 31	Giants	Giants Stadium	Jets 10–6	Jets 4–3
1996	September 22	Jets	Giants Stadium	Giants 13–6	Tied 4–4
1999	December 5	Giants	Giants Stadium	Giants 41–28	Giants 5–4
2003	November 2	Jets	Giants Stadium	Giants 31–28 (OT)	Giants 6–4
2007	October 7	Giants	Giants Stadium	Giants 35–24	Giants 7–4
2011	December 24	Jets	MetLife Stadium	Giants 29–14	Giants 8–4
2015	December 6	Giants	MetLife Stadium	Jets 23–20 (OT)	Giants 8–5
2019	November 10	Jets	MetLife Stadium	Jets 34–27	Giants 8–6
2023	October 29	Giants	MetLife Stadium	Jets 13–10 (OT)	Giants 8–7

== See also ==
- List of NFL rivalries
- Knicks–Nets rivalry
- Islanders–Rangers rivalry
- Mets–Yankees rivalry
- Hudson River Derby
