= Hudson River Derby =

American soccer rivalry

- Hudson River Derby Foundation logo
- Other names: New York derby (former)
- Location: New York metropolitan area
- Teams: New York City FC; New York Red Bulls
- First meeting: May 10, 2015; MLS regular season NYRB 2–1 NYC
- Latest meeting: September 18, 2026; MLS regular season NYC 0–1 NYRB
- Stadiums: Yankee Stadium, New York City; Citi Field, New York City; Sports Illustrated Stadium, Harrison, New Jersey

Statistics
- Total meetings: 35
- Most wins: New York Red Bulls (17)
- Top scorer: Bradley Wright-Phillips (12)
- All-time series: New York Red Bulls: 17; Drawn: 5 New York City FC: 13
- Regular season series: NYRB 12–5–12 NYC
- Postseason results: NYRB 1–0–0 NYC
- Largest victory: NYC 0–7 NYRB; MLS regular season (May 21, 2016)
- Longest win streak: New York Red Bulls (4)

Postseason history
- 2024 Conference Semifinals: Red Bulls won 2–0
- Location of the two teams' home stadiums in the New York metropolitan area (NYCFC splits its home matches between Yankee Stadium and Citi Field)

The Hudson River Derby, originally sometimes known as the New York derby, is the name given to the local derby between the two Major League Soccer (MLS) clubs based in the New York metropolitan area, New York City FC and the New York Red Bulls. The derby derives its name from the Hudson River, which passes between the home stadiums of the two clubs. First played in 2015, the rivalry between the two started almost as soon as New York City was awarded an expansion club in 2013. The derby is primarily contested for bragging rights of the current MLS regular season; although the two clubs occasionally meet in playoffs or other competitions, only regular-season results are counted towards the season trophy.

On July 12, 2019, three supporters groups—Empire Supporters Club and Viking Army from the Red Bulls, and the Third Rail from NYCFC—announced the formation of the Hudson River Derby Foundation, a non-profit corporation two years in the making, to "grow, manage, and administer the annual Hudson River Derby competition" between the two clubs. On September 9, 2023, the Hudson River Derby Foundation unveiled the physical trophy contested by the clubs, a bronze representation of the Statue of Liberty's torch.

Speaking about the rivalry between the two clubs, former U.S. men's national team goalkeeper and television commentator Tony Meola was quoted as saying "it isn't fabricated. Where sometimes in the past I think ... (the league) had to fabricate some of these rivalries."

== History ==
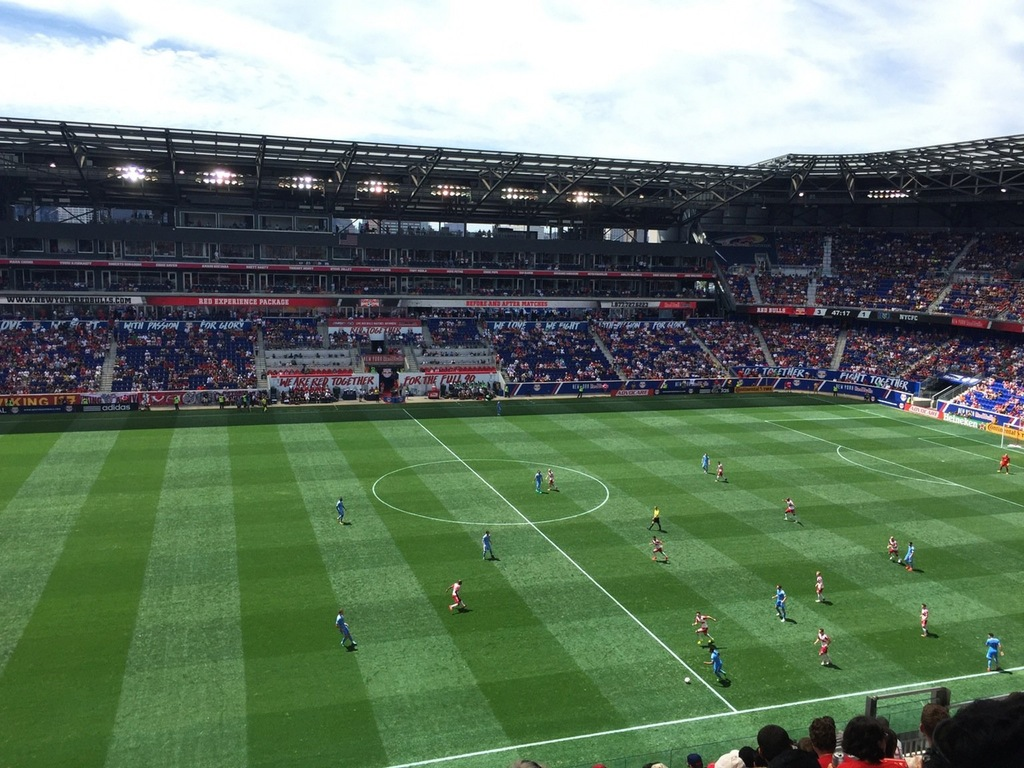
Red Bull Arena during the July 24, 2016 derby

New York City has a significant history with top level club soccer including the New York Cosmos of the North American Soccer League, the most successful team in that competition's history. With New York's position as the most populous city in the United States, it was expected when MLS was founded in 1993, that one of the founding clubs would play in the New York metropolitan area. This club started play in the inaugural 1996 MLS season as the NY/NJ MetroStars.

Since its start, MLS has engaged in a steady process of expansion from its initial ten clubs until 2010, when the league announced its intention to award its 20th franchise to New York City. The MetroStars, renamed as the New York Red Bulls following the franchise's purchase by Red Bull GmbH in 2006, played in New Jersey for their entire existence, beginning in Giants Stadium in East Rutherford, New Jersey, before moving to a purpose built soccer-specific stadium in Harrison, Red Bull Arena. The plan for the second New York franchise was for it to play in the city proper. That 20th franchise was indeed eventually awarded in 2013 to a consortium of the City Football Group and Yankee Global Enterprises, with the new club adopting the name New York City FC. NYCFC instantly made being in the five boroughs a key element of its club identity, as opposed to the suburban nature of the Red Bulls.

New York City FC began play in the 2015 MLS season. The first league meeting with the Red Bulls was scheduled for May 10 at Red Bull Arena. The buildup to the game saw an increasing level of antagonism between both the clubs and their respective supporters groups, with the Red Bulls emphasizing their history from the start of MLS as opposed to the new club, with NYCFC pointing to the fact that they are the only club to play within the five boroughs. The first meeting between the two, in front of a capacity crowd, saw striker Bradley Wright-Phillips score the first goal in a 2–1 win for the Red Bulls. Subsequent to this game, there were two further league meetings between the teams, at Yankee Stadium and Red Bull Arena, both resulting in wins for the Red Bulls. NYCFC won their first game against the Red Bulls at the fifth time of asking on July 3, 2016, at Yankee Stadium. The Red Bulls 7–0 win at Yankee Stadium in 2016 is tied for the highest victory margin in MLS history.

In 2017, New York City began to gain traction in the derby, going undefeated in all three meetings and finishing above the Red Bulls for the first time. On August 6, 2017, during a 3–2 New York City FC victory, David Villa recorded the derby's first ever hat trick.

That same year, the Red Bulls and New York City FC played their first exhibition game and the first derby match in a neutral stadium. The match was part of the 2017 Desert Diamond Cup in Tucson, Arizona with the match taking place on February 15, 2017. The Red Bulls won against New York City FC 2–0, with Sacha Kljestan scoring both goals. Neither NYFC nor NYRB failed to go to the Consolation round as both teams ended at the bottom.

Over the course of the following seasons, New York City began to grow beyond its expansion-club roots and establish themselves as a consistent playoff side. This enhanced the rivalry further, leading to tense and sometimes heated encounters between the two sides including a back and forth 1–1 draw in August of 2018 with the Red Bulls and New York City going into the match 2nd and 3rd in the East respectively. The encounter saw multiple red cards and fouls over the course of the match.

In 2019, another controversial match saw the Red Bulls defeat New York City 2–1 in Red Bull Arena, with the match being referred to as ‘Throw-In Gate’ as miscommunication from the referee to the players led to the winning Red Bulls goal.

Following the pandemic, the rivalry continued to bring some meaningful encounters including a 1–1 in 2021, which saw two red cards and the Red Bulls score the equalizer in the 101st minute, the latest goal scored in the history of the MLS Regular Season. Another crucial encounter in 2022 saw New York City and the Red Bulls square off in the quarterfinal of the Lamar Hunt U.S. Open Cup.

In 2023, the two sides met in the Leagues Cup, the first-ever encounter in a continental cup competition. The Red Bulls won 1–0.

In 2024, the two teams competed in the MLS Cup playoffs for the first time in history after New York City FC and the Red Bulls upset FC Cincinnati and the Columbus Crew, respectively, in the first round. The two teams played the Eastern Conference semifinals on November 23, 2024, where the Red Bulls defeated New York City 2–0 to advance to the Eastern Conference final. The Red Bulls went on to defeat Orlando City SC, before losing to the Los Angeles Galaxy in the MLS Cup Final.

== Name ==
When the two teams first faced off against each other, MLS promoted it as the "New York Derby". Supporters of the two clubs quickly adopted "Hudson River Derby" as their preferred name, which gained in prominence until the league and its commercial partners were the only prominent outlets using the old name. Since the establishment of the Foundation and its namesake trophy, the league itself has used the supporters' name for the derby.

== Format ==
The clubs compete for a trophy signifying the winner of the regular-season MLS series. Only MLS regular season matches count towards the total. Three points are awarded for a win, and one point for a draw. In the event of a points tie, tiebreakers are used, in this order:

- Greater goal difference
- Greater number of goals scored
- Fewer overall disciplinary points by club (each yellow card is assessed 1 point, each red 2 points)

The winning club is awarded the Hudson River Derby Trophy for that season, and retains the physical trophy until the completion of the series the following year.

== Trophy ==
The Hudson River Derby Trophy is a 15" tall bronze sculpture of the Statue of Liberty's torch, chosen because the statue stands on Liberty Island in New York Harbor. The bronze sculpture stands on a 3.5" circular black wood base bearing the Foundation's logo. Crafted by Bennett Awards, the trophy features a green patina on the torch itself and gold patina on the flames, mimicking the copper plating and gold leaf of the original. The Hudson River Derby Foundation funded the trophy by soliciting $5,000 in donations from supporters.

== Fans ==
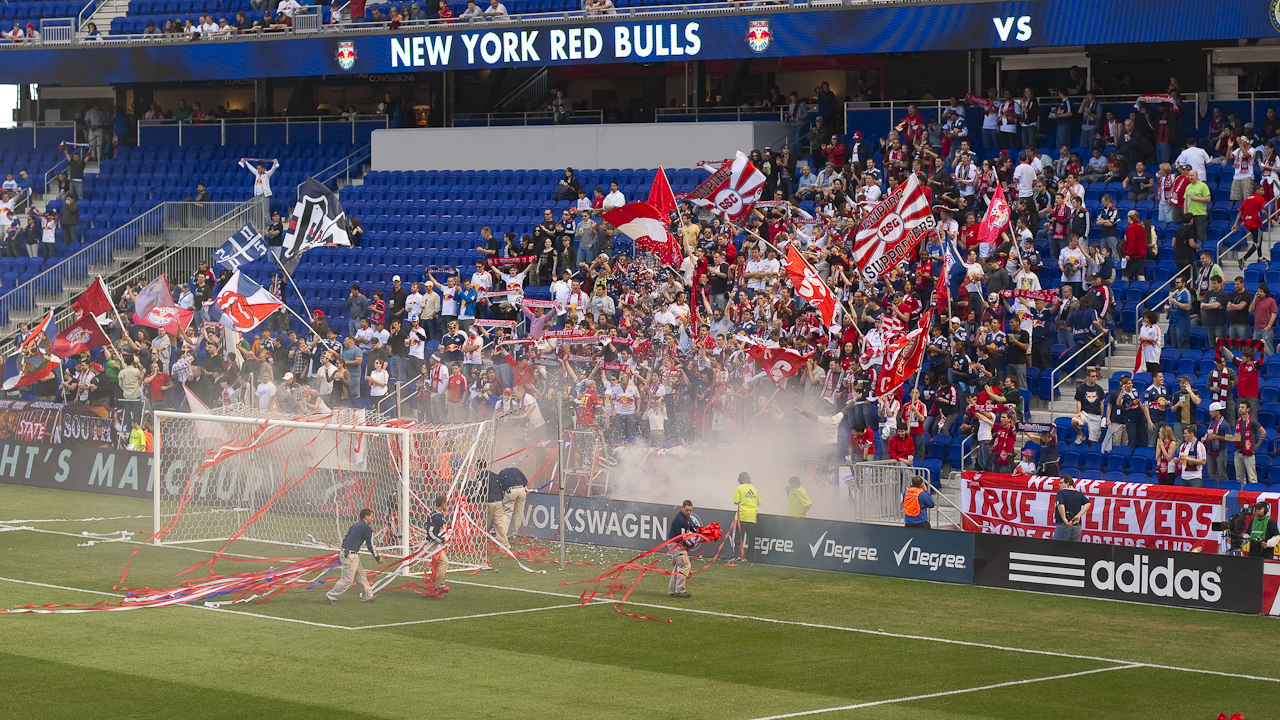
The Empire Supporters Club at Red Bull Arena in 2010

A variety of supporters clubs and groups have grown around the Red Bulls since the team started. The first of these was formed in 1995, prior to the inception of the team itself, as the Empire Supporters Club. 2005 saw the creation of the New Jersey–based Garden State Supporters, now the Garden State Ultras (GSU). The 2010 season's influx of personnel with a Scandinavian background led to the creation of the Viking Army Supporters Club. The Red Bulls have designated some sections of Red Bull Arena as supporter specific. These included sections 101 for the Empire Supporters Club, 102 for the Viking Army, and section 133 for the Garden State Supporters. Sections 133, 101, and 102 are collectively known as the "South Ward".

New York City FC's first official supporter group, The Third Rail, began to form after the club's announcement in May 2013, when fans met through social media, and through member drives and viewing parties for 2014 FIFA World Cup matches. It had registered 1,000 paid members by September 20, 2014. Although the group operates independently from the club, it was recognized as the official supporter group and has received exclusive access to two sections in Yankee Stadium. Group president Chance Michaels said the name reflected the group's desire to "power NYCFC" the way the third rail powers the New York City subway system.

Even from the beginning of NYCFC's time in MLS, the rivalry between the supporters has been intense, with social media used extensively by both sets of fans to exchange everything from mild teasing to insults and vitriol. Following the first meeting between the two sides at the Red Bull Arena, the Red Bulls cut the ticket allocation for away fans by two thirds for the next meeting at the venue, as a result of the behavior of NYCFC fans; NYCFC fans were equally damning of the behavior of Red Bulls fans during their first visit to Yankee Stadium. Prior to their third and final league meeting of the 2015 season, the first reported incident of violence between the two sets of fans occurred at a gastropub in Newark frequented by members of the Garden State Ultras.

== Transactions ==
To date, only one trade has occurred between the two teams. On December 11, 2014, the Red Bulls sent Ryan Meara on a one-year loan to NYCFC for the rights to Sal Zizzo, who had been selected from Sporting Kansas City in the 2014 MLS Expansion Draft the previous day. Meara returned to the Red Bulls after the 2015 season.

== Results ==
NYRB wins NYCFC wins Draw

No.	Date	Competition	Venue	Home team	Score	Away team	Goalscorers	Attendance
1.	May 10, 2015	MLS	Red Bull Arena	New York Red Bulls	2–1	New York City FC	(H) Wright-Phillips (2) (A) Mullins	25,217
2.	June 28, 2015	MLS	Yankee Stadium	New York City FC	1–3	New York Red Bulls	(H) McNamara (A) Wright-Phillips, Duvall, Miazga	48,047
3.	August 9, 2015	MLS	Red Bull Arena	New York Red Bulls	2–0	New York City FC	(H) Wright-Phillips, Felipe (A)	25,219
4.	May 21, 2016	MLS	Yankee Stadium	New York City FC	0–7	New York Red Bulls	(H) (A) McCarty (2), Wright-Phillips (2), Muyl, Verón, Baah	37,858
5.	July 3, 2016	MLS	Yankee Stadium	New York City FC	2–0	New York Red Bulls	(H) Harrison, Villa (A)	33,613
6.	July 24, 2016	MLS	Red Bull Arena	New York Red Bulls	4–1	New York City FC	(H) Wright-Phillips (2), Zubar, Kljestan (A) McNamara	25,218
7.	June 14, 2017	Open Cup	Red Bull Arena	New York Red Bulls	1–0	New York City FC	(H) Royer (A)	11,311
8.	June 24, 2017	MLS	Red Bull Arena	New York Red Bulls	0–2	New York City FC	(H) (A) Harrison Sweat	25,219
9.	August 6, 2017	MLS	Yankee Stadium	New York City FC	3–2	New York Red Bulls	(H) Villa (3) (A) Wright-Phillips (2)	33,679
10.	August 25, 2017	MLS	Red Bull Arena	New York Red Bulls	1–1	New York City FC	(H) Verón (A) Moralez	25,219
11.	May 5, 2018	MLS	Red Bull Arena	New York Red Bulls	4–0	New York City FC	(H) Kaku, Valot, Wright-Phillips, Etienne (A)	25,219
12.	June 6, 2018	Open Cup	Red Bull Arena	New York Red Bulls	4–0	New York City FC	(H) Bezecourt, Long, Royer (2) (A)	9,496
13.	July 8, 2018	MLS	Yankee Stadium	New York City FC	1–0	New York Red Bulls	(H) Moralez (A)	30,027
14.	August 22, 2018	MLS	Yankee Stadium	New York City FC	1–1	New York Red Bulls	(H) Villa (A) Wright-Phillips	30,139
15.	July 14, 2019	MLS	Red Bull Arena	New York Red Bulls	2–1	New York City FC	(H) Royer (2) (A) Héber	20,128
16.	August 24, 2019	MLS	Yankee Stadium	New York City FC	2–1	New York Red Bulls	(H) Moralez, Héber (A) Muyl	28,895
17.	August 20, 2020	MLS	Red Bull Arena	New York Red Bulls	1–0	New York City FC	(H) Duncan (A)	0 (Note: No fans due to the COVID-19 pandemic restrictions.)
18.	November 1, 2020	MLS	Yankee Stadium	New York City FC	5–2	New York Red Bulls	(H) Castellanos (3), Mackay-Steven, Ring (A) White, Cásseres	0
19.	September 22, 2021 (Note: Originally scheduled on August 21, 2021 but was postponed due to unsafe field conditions after a weather delay that day)	MLS	Red Bull Arena	New York Red Bulls	1–1	New York City FC	(H) Klimala (A) Castellanos	16,072
20.	September 25, 2021	MLS	Yankee Stadium	New York City FC	0–1	New York Red Bulls	(H) (A) Fernandez	21,212
21.	October 17, 2021	MLS	Red Bull Arena	New York Red Bulls	1–0	New York City FC	(H) Cásseres (A)	18,613
22.	June 22, 2022	Open Cup	Red Bull Arena	New York Red Bulls	3–0	New York City FC	(H) Morgan, Luquinhas, Fernandez (A)	12,575
23.	July 17, 2022	MLS	Red Bull Arena	New York Red Bulls	0–1	New York City FC	(H) (A) Castellanos	25,219
24.	September 17, 2022	MLS	Yankee Stadium	New York City FC	2–0	New York Red Bulls	(H) Callens, Rodríguez (A)	30,151
25.	May 13, 2023	MLS	Red Bull Arena	New York Red Bulls	1–0	New York City FC	(H) Fernandez (A)	23,121
26.	August 3, 2023	Leagues Cup	Red Bull Arena	New York Red Bulls	1–0	New York City FC	(H) Fernandez (A)	11,004
27.	September 16, 2023	MLS	Yankee Stadium	New York City FC	0–0	New York Red Bulls	(H) (A)	29,657
28.	May 18, 2024	MLS	Citi Field	New York City FC	2–1	New York Red Bulls	(H) Wolf, Bakrar (A) Harper	30,731
29.	September 28, 2024	MLS	Red Bull Arena	New York Red Bulls	1–5	New York City FC	(H) Vanzeir (A) Moralez, Martínez (2), Perea, Gray	25,291
30.	November 23, 2024	MLS Cup Playoffs	Citi Field	New York City FC	0–2	New York Red Bulls	(H) (A) Carballo, Vanzeir	24,891
31.	May 17, 2025	MLS	Citi Field	New York City FC	2–0	New York Red Bulls	(H) Martínez, Moralez (A)	30,804
32.	September 27, 2025	MLS	Sports Illustrated Stadium	New York Red Bulls	2–3	New York City FC	(H) Hall, Forsberg (A) Fernández, Perea, Thiago Martins	25,219
33.	April 29, 2026	Open Cup	Sports Illustrated Stadium	New York Red Bulls	1–3	New York City FC	(H) Hall (A) Trewin, Raul Gustavo, Thiago Martins	9,000
34.	May 16, 2026	MLS	Sports Illustrated Stadium	New York Red Bulls	1–1	New York City FC	(H) Ruvalcaba (A) Perea	25,219
35.	September 18, 2026	MLS	Yankee Stadium	New York City FC	0–1	New York Red Bulls	(H) (A) Hall	29,270

== Statistics ==
=== Summary of results ===
As of September 18, 2026

	Matches	NYRB wins	Draws	NYCFC wins	NYRB goals	NYCFC goals
Major League Soccer	29	12	5	12	42	40
MLS Cup playoffs	1	1	0	0	2	0
U.S. Open Cup	4	3	0	1	9	3
Leagues Cup	1	1	0	0	1	0
All competitions	35	17	5	13	54	43

=== Top goalscorers ===
As of September 18, 2026

Players currently playing for their respective Hudson River Derby club are in bold.

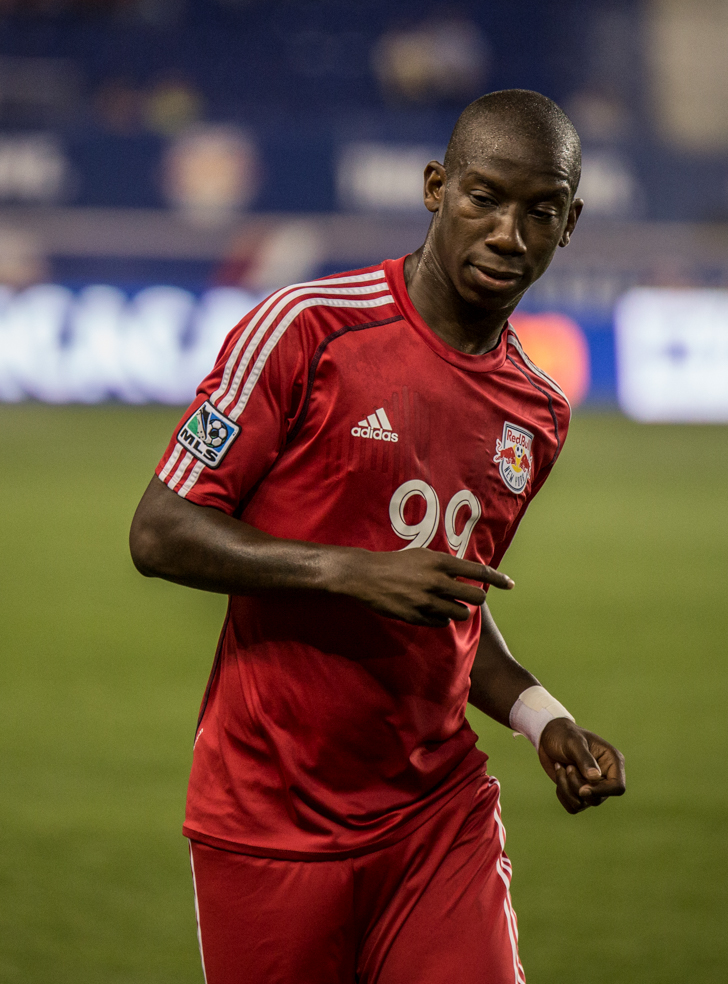
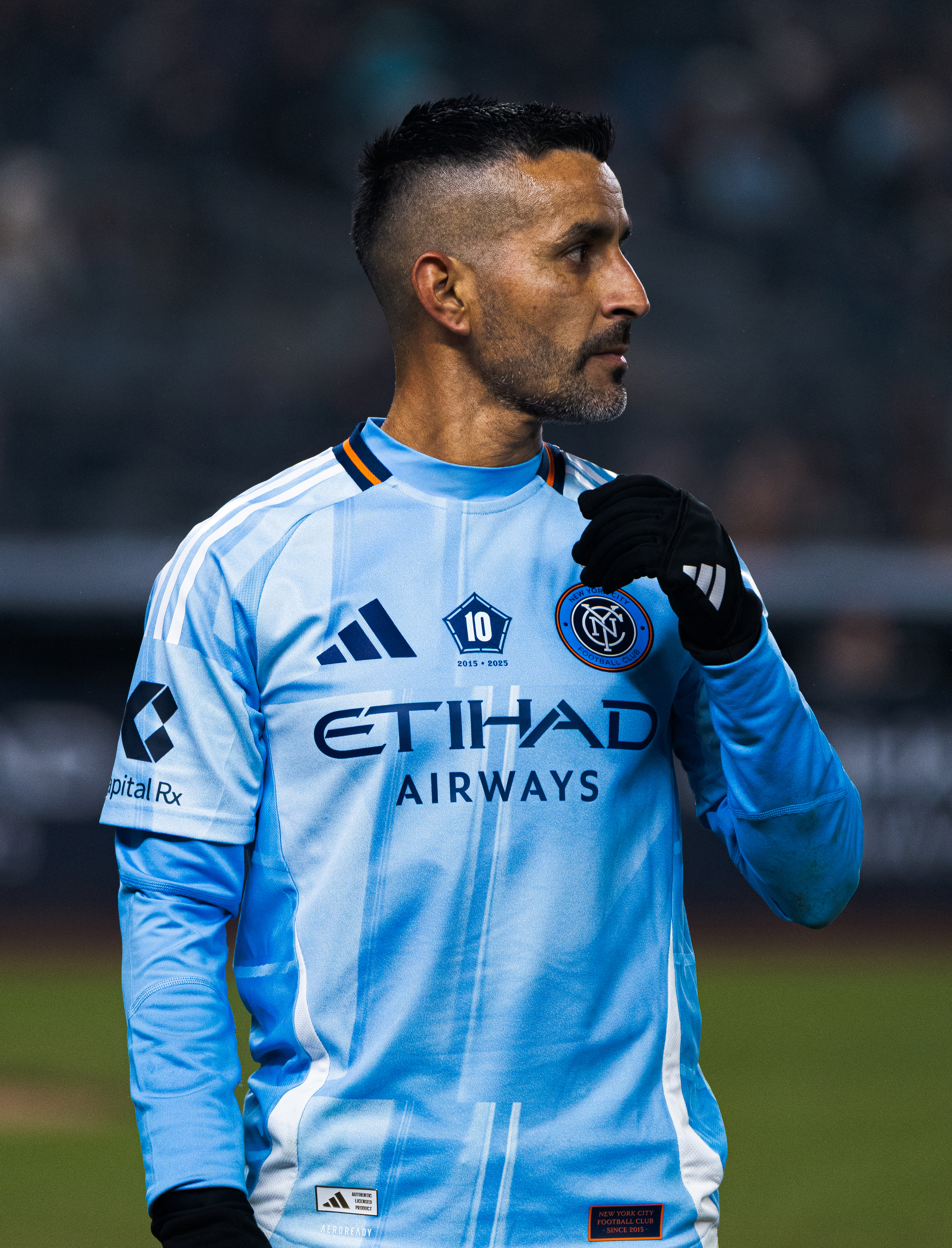
The top scorers for each side are Bradley Wright-Phillips (left) and Maxi Moralez, tied with two others (right)

Rank	Player	Team	Goals
1	(England) Bradley Wright-Phillips	New York Red Bulls	12
2	(Spain) David Villa	New York City FC	5
2	(Argentina) Taty Castellanos	New York City FC	5
2	(Argentina) **Maxi Moralez**	New York City FC	5
2	(Austria) Daniel Royer	New York Red Bulls	5
6	(United States) Omir Fernandez	New York Red Bulls	4
7	(United States) **Julian Hall**	New York Red Bulls	3
7	(Costa Rica) **Alonso Martínez**	New York City FC	3
7	(United States) **Andrés Perea**	New York City FC	3
10	(Venezuela) Cristian Cásseres Jr.	New York Red Bulls	2
10	(England) Jack Harrison	New York City FC	2
10	(Brazil) Héber	New York City FC	2
10	(Brazil) **Thiago Martins**	New York City FC	2
10	(United States) Dax McCarty	New York Red Bulls	2
10	(United States) Thomas McNamara	New York City FC	2
10	(United States) Alex Muyl	New York Red Bulls	2
10	(Belgium) Dante Vanzeir	New York Red Bulls	2
10	(Argentina) Gonzalo Verón	New York Red Bulls	2

== Honors ==
As of July 20, 2023

Team	MLS Cup	Supporters' Shield	U.S. Open Cup	CONCACAF Champions Cup	Campeones Cup	Leagues Cup	Conference Championship	Total
New York Red Bulls	0	3	0	0	0	0	2	5
New York City FC	1	0	0	0	1	0	1	3
Combined	1	3	0	0	1	0	3	8

== Players who played for both clubs ==
Player	Red Bulls career			NYCFC career		
Player	Span	Apps	Goals	Span	Apps	Goals
(Puerto Rico) Jason Hernandez	2005	5	0	2015–2016	59	0
(Morocco) Mehdi Ballouchy	2010–2012	59	4	2015–2016	25	3
(United States) Ryan Meara	2012–2025	67	0	2015 (loan)	1	0
(United States) **Matt Miazga**	2013–2015	42	1	2026–	0	0

Players currently playing for their respective Hudson River Derby club are written in bold.

== See also ==
- MLS rivalry cups
- Islanders–Rangers rivalry
- Devils–Rangers rivalry
- Subway Series
- Mets–Yankees rivalry
- Knicks–Nets rivalry
- Giants–Jets rivalry
