= Yale Bowl =

College football stadium in Connecticut, US

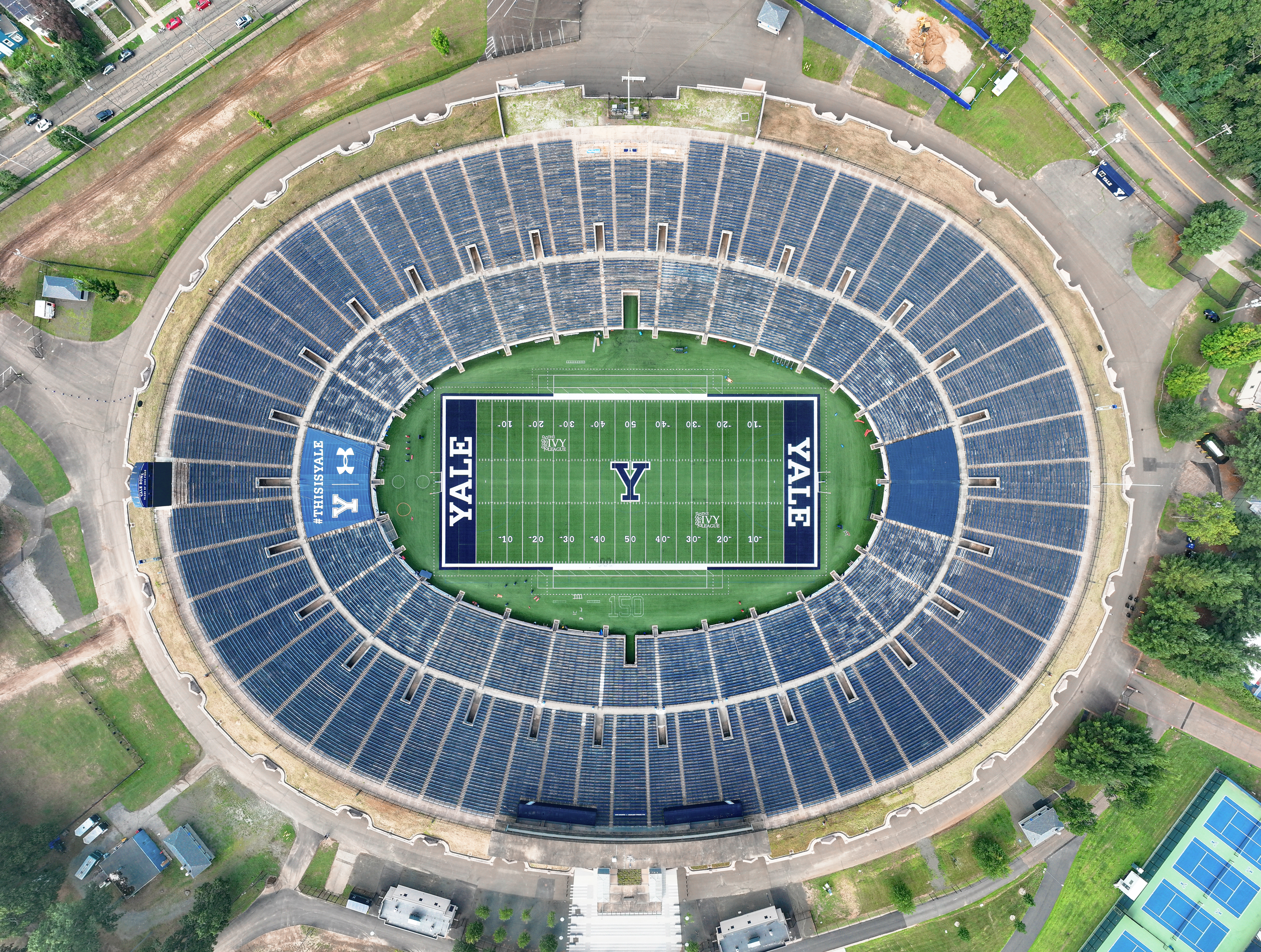
- Aerial view of the stadium in 2023
- Interactive map of Yale Bowl
- Address: 81 Central Avenue
- Location: New Haven, Connecticut
- Coordinates: 41.313°N 72.960°W
- Owner: Yale University
- Operator: Yale University
- Capacity: 61,446 (2006–present) Former capacity: List: 64,246 (1994–2005); 70,896 (1914–1993)
- Surface: Field Turf (2019–present); Natural grass (1914–2018)
- Public transit: 255

Construction
- Groundbreaking: August 1913
- Opened: November 21, 1914; 111 years ago
- Cost: US$750,000 ($24.1 million in 2025)
- Architects: Charles A. Ferry (Class of 1871)

Tenants
- Yale Bulldogs (NCAA) 1914–present New York Giants (NFL) 1973–1974; Connecticut Bicentennials (NASL) 1976–1977

Website
- yalebulldogs.com/yale-bowl
- Yale Bowl
- U.S. National Register of Historic Places
- U.S. National Historic Landmark
- Location within Connecticut Location within the United States
- Coordinates: 41°18′47″N 72°57′38″W
- Built: 1914
- Architect: Charles A. Ferry; Sperry Engineering Co.
- NRHP reference No.: 87000756

Significant dates
- Added to NRHP: February 27, 1987
- Designated NHL: February 27, 1987

The Yale Bowl is a college football stadium located in New Haven, Connecticut, near the border with West Haven, about 1.5 miles (2.4 km) west of the main campus of Yale University. The home of the Yale Bulldogs of the Ivy League, it opened 112 years ago in 1914 with 70,896 seats; renovations have reduced its current capacity to 61,446, still making it the second largest stadium in the NCAA Division I Football Championship Subdivision (FCS), behind Nissan Stadium, used by Tennessee State. It is the largest on-campus FCS stadium that is in an automatic qualifying conference for the FCS Playoffs, which the Ivy League has participated in since 2025.

The Yale Bowl inspired the design and naming of the Rose Bowl, from which is derived the name of college football's post-season bowl games and the National Football League's Super Bowl.

In 1973 and 1974, the stadium hosted the New York Giants of the National Football League, as Yankee Stadium was renovated and while Giants Stadium was under construction. The Giants moved to Shea Stadium in 1975 and shared it with fellow NFL team the New York Jets as well as the two Major League Baseball teams in New York, the Mets and Yankees (who were playing at Shea while Yankee Stadium was being renovated), and moved into new Giants Stadium in 1976.

== History ==
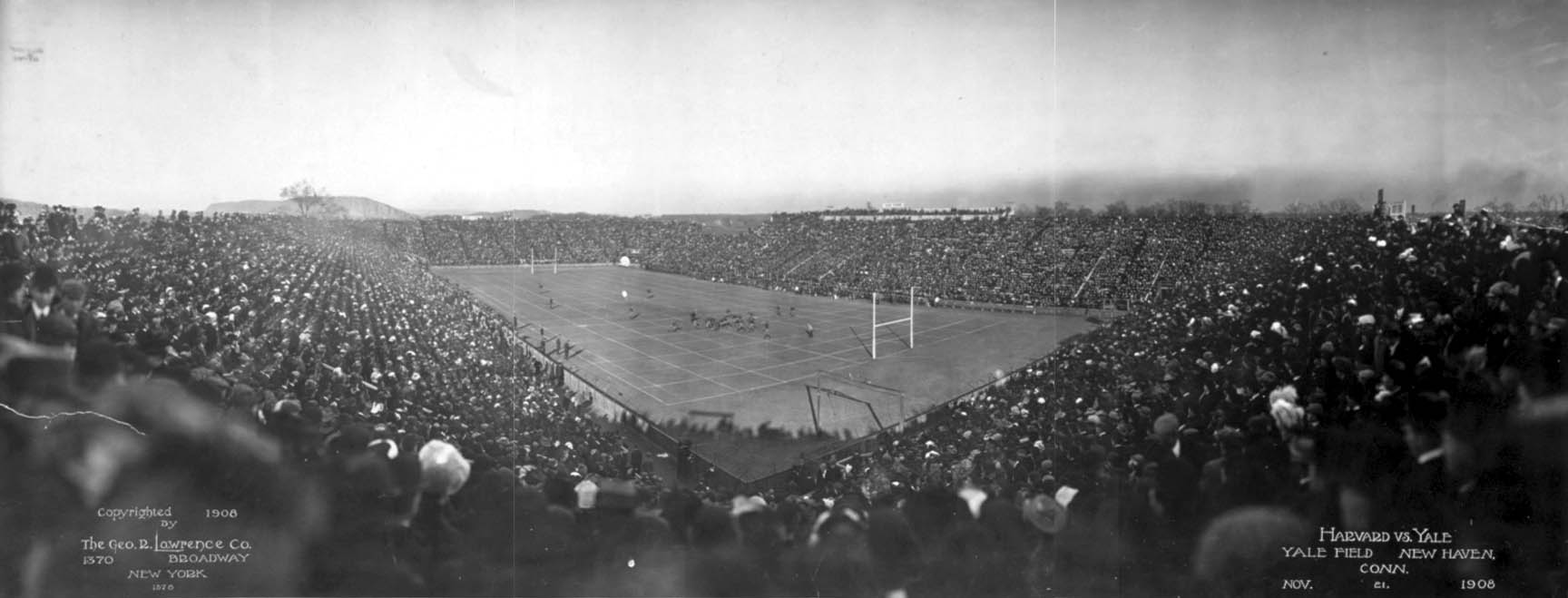
Yale v Harvard game at Yale Field, 1908 (predecessor stadium to Yale Bowl)

Ground was broken on the stadium in August 1913. Fill excavated from the field area was used to build up a berm around the perimeter to create an elliptical bowl. The facade was designed to partially echo the campus's Neo-Gothic design, and, as with some central campus buildings, acid was applied to imitate the effects of aging.

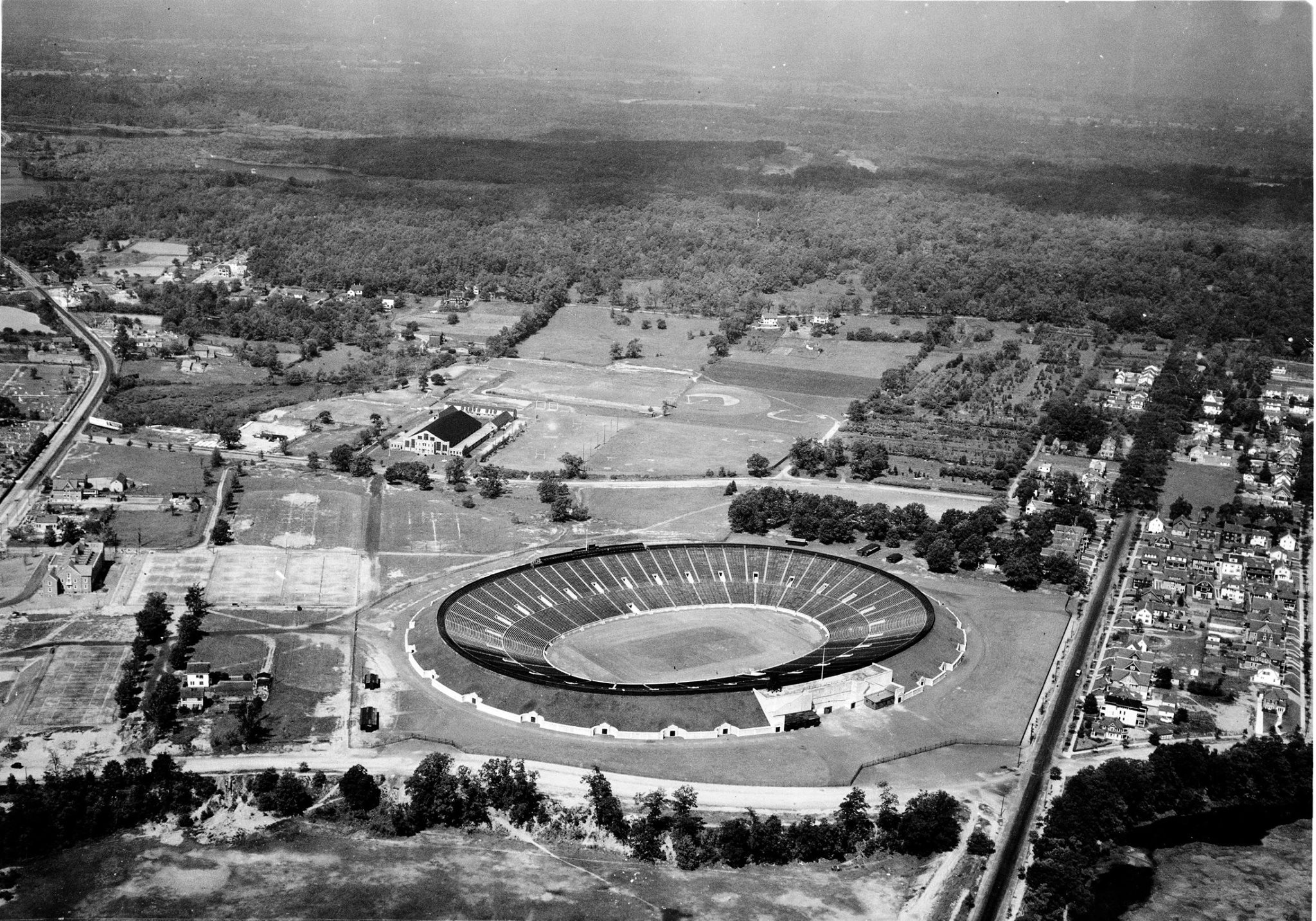
Yale Bowl in 1924

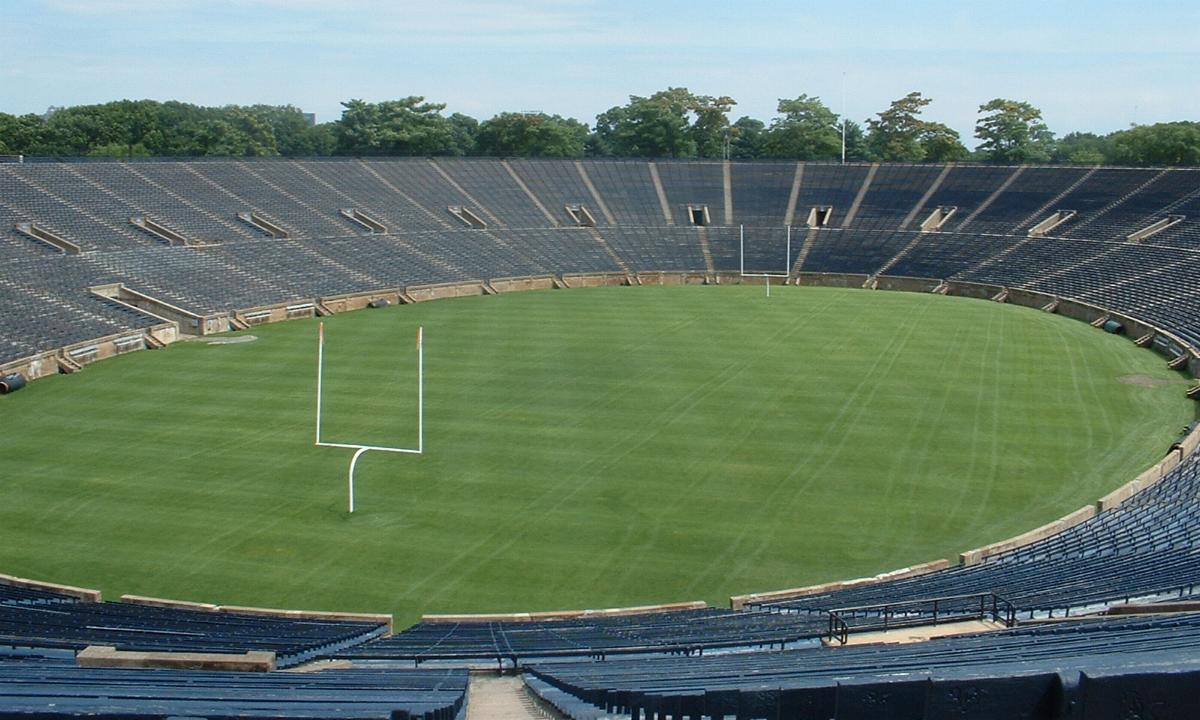
View of the stadium in 2005

It was the first bowl-shaped stadium in the country, and inspired the design of such stadiums as the Rose Bowl, the Los Angeles Memorial Coliseum, and Michigan Stadium. It was declared a National Historic Landmark in 1987 for its role in football history.

The Yale Bowl's designer, Charles A. Ferry, for unknown reasons chose not to include locker rooms (or restrooms). Players dress in the Smilow Field Center and walk 200 yards (185 m) to the field. When the NFL's Giants played at the stadium (1973, 1974), the pro players disliked the arrangement, but Yale players reportedly enjoy the walk. Fans cheer for the team as it marches to the stadium while the Yale Band plays, a tradition known as the "Bulldog Walk".

The Bowl's first game, on November 21, 1914, drew more than 68,000 spectators, who watched the Bulldogs lose 36–0 to rival Harvard.

In 1958, a new scoreboard was installed; its distinctive clock was arranged vertically instead of horizontally.

During the 1970s, the Bowl hosted several concerts. In 1971, Yes performed on July 24 and the Grateful Dead on July 31, a recording of which was released as Road Trips Volume 1 Number 3. But neighborhood opposition to the concerts brought them to an end after a June 14, 1980, show featuring the Eagles, Heart, and The Little River Band. A picture from the show was published with the vinyl edition of the Eagles double live album, issued later that year, though no recordings from the event are included on the discs. A Paul McCartney concert was scheduled for June 1990, but cancelled amid neighbors' opposition; the show was moved to Chicago.

The stadium has hosted many soccer matches over the years; it served as home field for the Connecticut Bicentennials of the North American Soccer League during the 1976 and 1977 seasons. Yale Bowl was mulled as a possible playing site when the United States hosted the World Cup in 1994, but lost out to Foxboro Stadium in Massachusetts and Giants Stadium in New Jersey.

In 1991, the Bowl's vicinity saw the addition of the Cullman-Heyman Tennis Center, home to the annual ATP/WTA event (the Pilot Pen tournament), across Yale Avenue from the stadium.

On October 5, 2001, the closing ceremony of the Yale Tercentennial was held at the Yale Bowl. Guests included Tom Wolfe '57, William F. Buckley '50, Sesame Street's Big Bird, Paul Simon '96 Hon, and Garry Trudeau '70.

By the 21st century, many of the outside retaining walls and portal entries were deteriorating. In the spring and summer of 2006, the bowl received a partial renovation, including a new scoreboard. The work was completed just in time for the first home game of the Yale football team's season on September 16.

The annual game between Yale and its rival Harvard, known locally as The Game, is held at the Yale Bowl every other year. In 2023, its attendance was over 51,000.

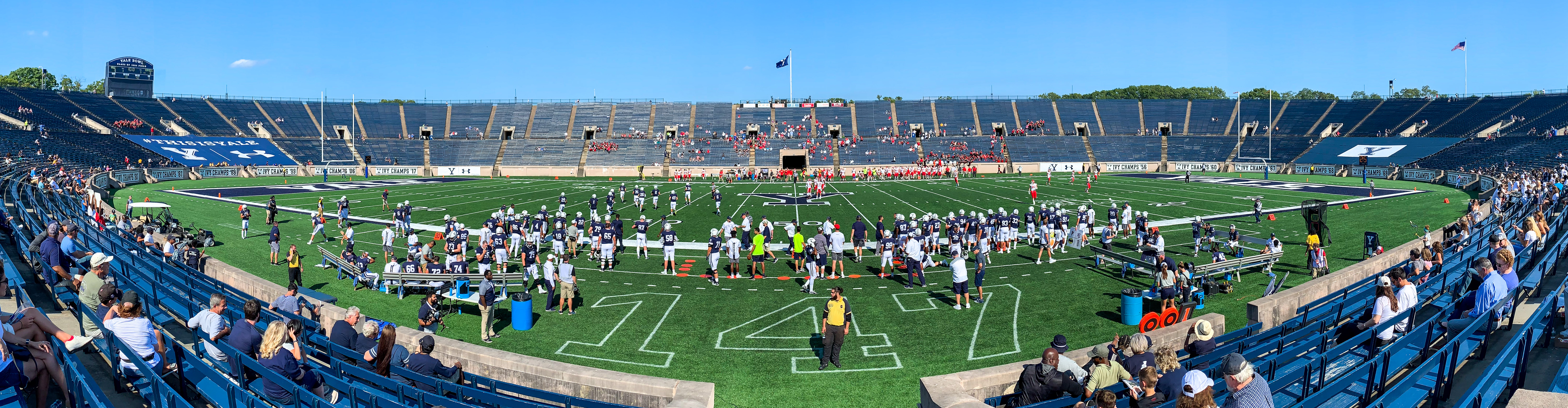
Panoramic view of Yale Bowl. Scoreboard at left. Yale/Cornell football game, September 28, 2019. The "147" stands for the number of Yale football seasons (and teams) until that point.

== Sports ==
=== Football ===
==== NFL ====
The New York Giants of the National Football League (NFL) won just one of the dozen home games they played in New Haven in the 1973 and 1974 seasons. (With the exception of the games played with replacement teams during the 1987 NFL strike and the COVID-19-disrupted 2020 season, the attendance at the final game at the Yale Bowl is the smallest at a Giants' home game since 1955.) The team also played preseason games in the stadium, including the first-ever game against future rival and stadium share partner, the defending Super Bowl champion New York Jets, a Sunday afternoon sellout in mid-August 1969.

Date	Home	Opponent	Score	Attendance
October 7, 1973	New York Giants	Green Bay Packers	14–16	70,050
October 14, 1973	New York Giants	Washington Redskins	3–21	70,168
November 11, 1973	New York Giants	Dallas Cowboys	10–23	70,128
November 18, 1973	New York Giants	St. Louis Cardinals	24–13	65,795
December 16, 1973	New York Giants	Minnesota Vikings	7–31	70,041
September 15, 1974	New York Giants	Washington Redskins	10–13	49,849
September 22, 1974	New York Giants	New England Patriots	20–28	44,082
October 6, 1974	New York Giants	Atlanta Falcons	7–14	42,379
October 27, 1974	New York Giants	Dallas Cowboys	7–21	57,381
November 10, 1974	New York Giants	New York Jets	20–26^{OT}	64,327
November 24, 1974	New York Giants	St. Louis Cardinals	21–23	40,615
December 8, 1974	New York Giants	Philadelphia Eagles	7–20	21,170

=== Soccer ===
==== International ====
Date	Teams	Attendance
May 31, 1976	Brazil 4–1 Italy	36,096
May 31, 1992	Italy 0–0 Portugal	38,833
June 6, 1993	United States 0–2 Brazil	44,579
May 28, 1994	United States 1–1 Greece	21,317
June 10, 1994	Italy 1–0 Costa Rica	23,547
March 29, 1998	Colombia 1–1 Paraguay	25,236

==== NASL (1976–1977) ====
The Connecticut Bicentennials of the NASL played two seasons at the Yale Bowl, mostly in front of dismal crowds. Even their highest-ever home attendance, against the New York Cosmos in 1977, drew only 17,302 fans, leaving the stadium more than three-quarters empty. However, the Bi's could only draw a total of 57,438—less than the Bowl's capacity for a single game—in their other 21 home games combined, an average of only 2,735 per contest. After the 1977 season, the club relocated to become the Oakland Stompers.

Date	Home	Opponent	Score	Attendance
June 2, 1976	Connecticut Bicentennials	Rochester Lancers	2–1	1,853
June 12, 1976	Connecticut Bicentennials	Miami Toros	1–1 (S/O)	3,105
June 20, 1976	Connecticut Bicentennials	Chicago Sting	2–1	3,289
June 24, 1976	Connecticut Bicentennials	San Diego Jaws	1–1 (S/O)	1,642
June 30, 1976	Connecticut Bicentennials	San Antonio Thunder	1–1 (S/O)	1,426
July 7, 1976	Connecticut Bicentennials	Washington Diplomats	2–1 (S/O)	2,100
July 24, 1976	Connecticut Bicentennials (United States)	(Canada) Toronto Metros-Croatia	4–4 (S/O)	4,122
July 30, 1976	Connecticut Bicentennials	Tampa Bay Rowdies	0–7	3,800
Aug. 14, 1976	Connecticut Bicentennials	St. Louis Stars	2–1	3,376
May 8, 1977	Connecticut Bicentennials	New York Cosmos	2–3	17,302
May 15, 1977	Connecticut Bicentennials	Tampa Bay Rowdies	1–4	1,520
May 29, 1977	Connecticut Bicentennials	San Jose Earthquakes	3–2	2,257
June 12, 1977	Connecticut Bicentennials	Fort Lauderdale Strikers	0–2	6,213
June 15, 1977	Connecticut Bicentennials	Team Hawaii	1–2	1,295
June 19, 1977	Connecticut Bicentennials	St. Louis Stars	0–3	1,222
June 26, 1977	Connecticut Bicentennials	Rochester Lancers	2–1	2,832
June 29, 1977	Connecticut Bicentennials	Los Angeles Aztecs	2–3	2,915
July 13, 1977	Connecticut Bicentennials	Las Vegas Quicksilvers	4–3	3,472
July 17, 1977	Connecticut Bicentennials (United States)	(Canada) Toronto Metros-Croatia	0–4	4,515
July 27, 1977	Connecticut Bicentennials	Seattle Sounders	1–4	2,169
August 3, 1977	Connecticut Bicentennials	Washington Diplomats	4–1	1,100
August 7, 1977	Connecticut Bicentennials	Chicago Sting	1–1 (S/O)	3,215

== Gallery ==
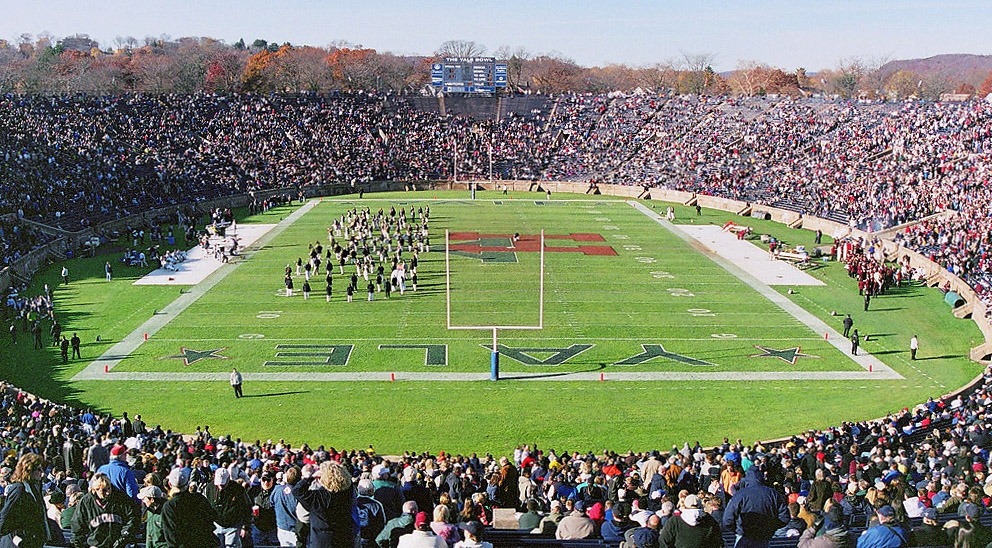
Yale v Harvard game, 2001

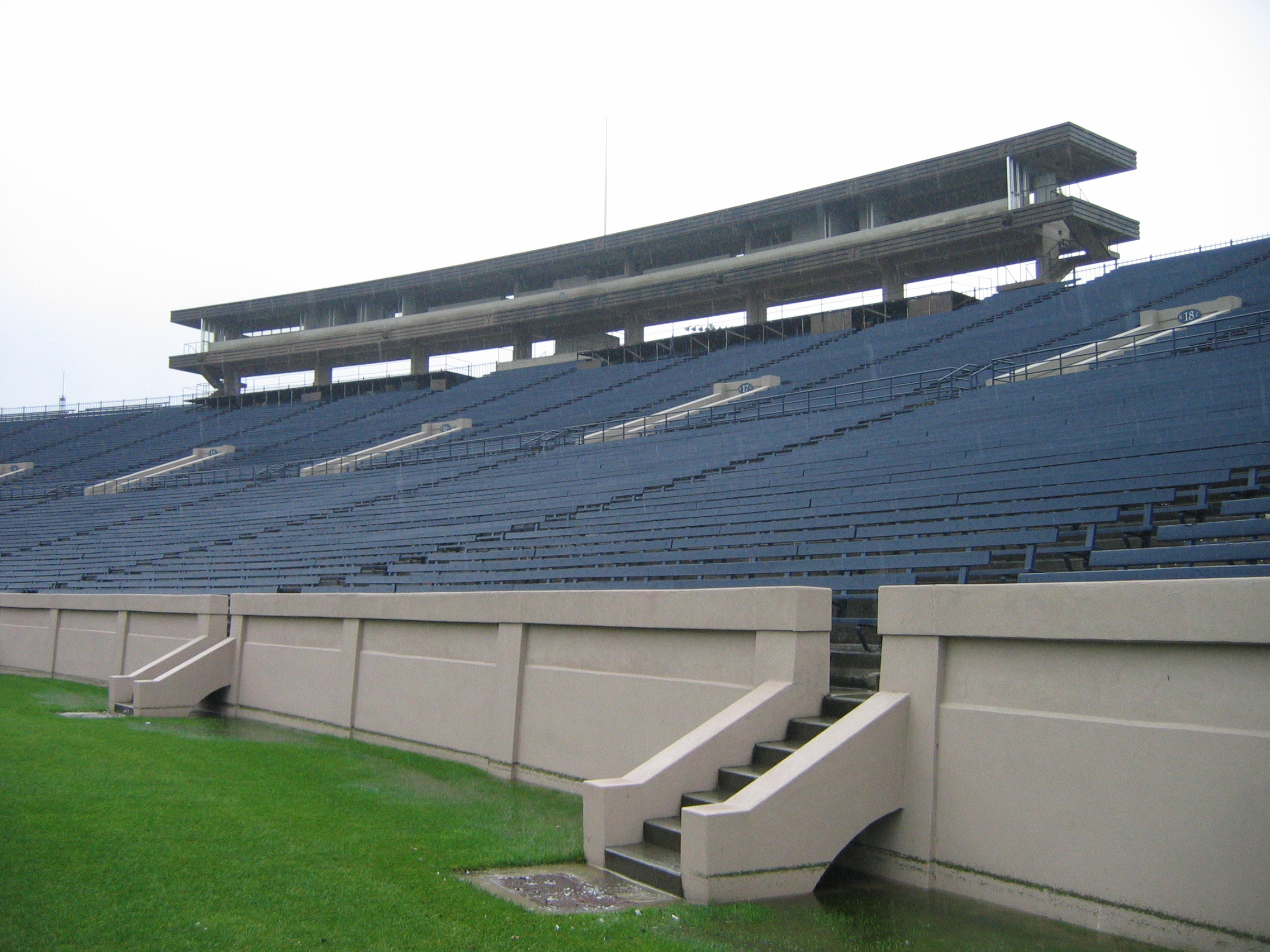
Grandstand, 2008

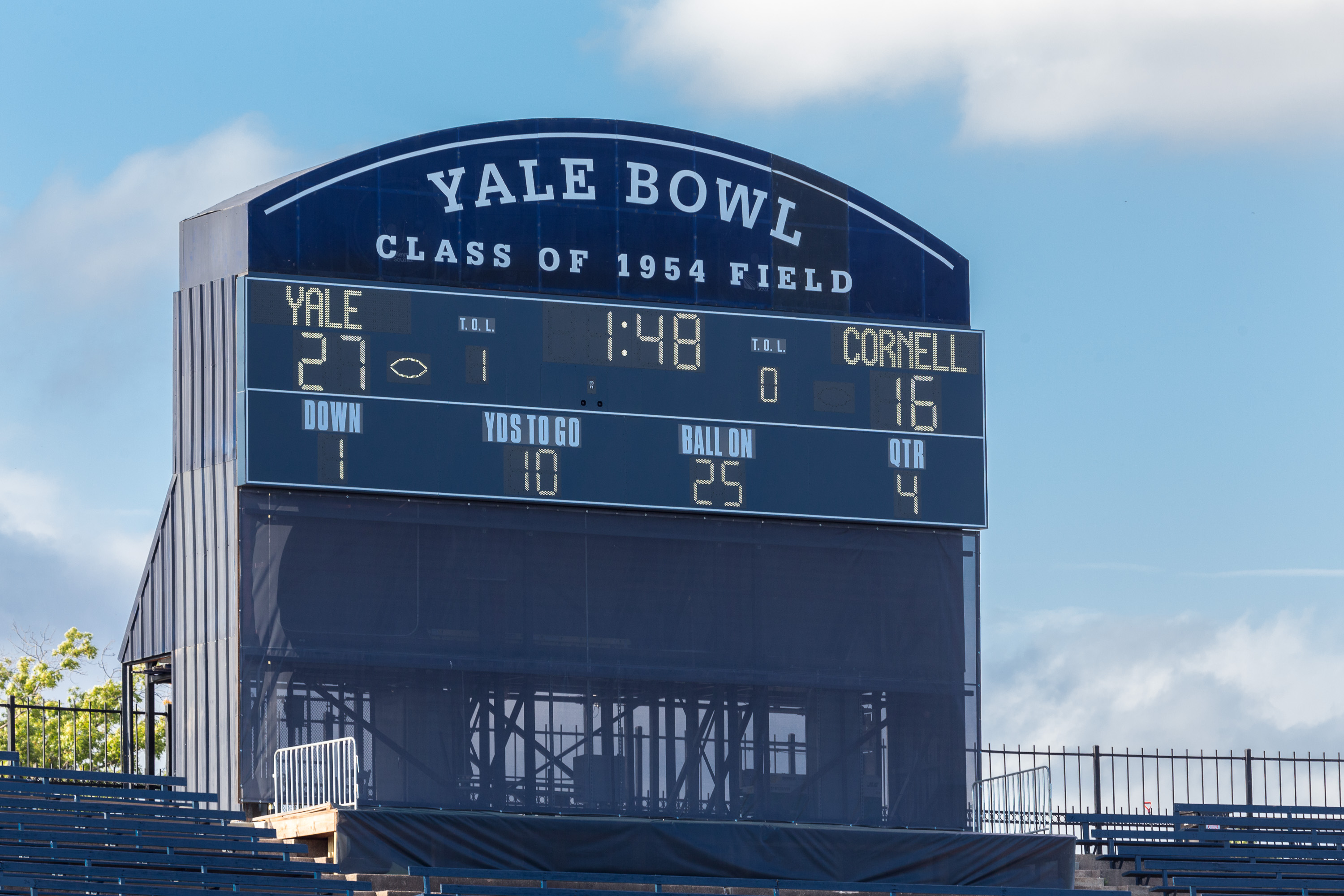
Yale Bowl scoreboard, behind north end zone, 2019

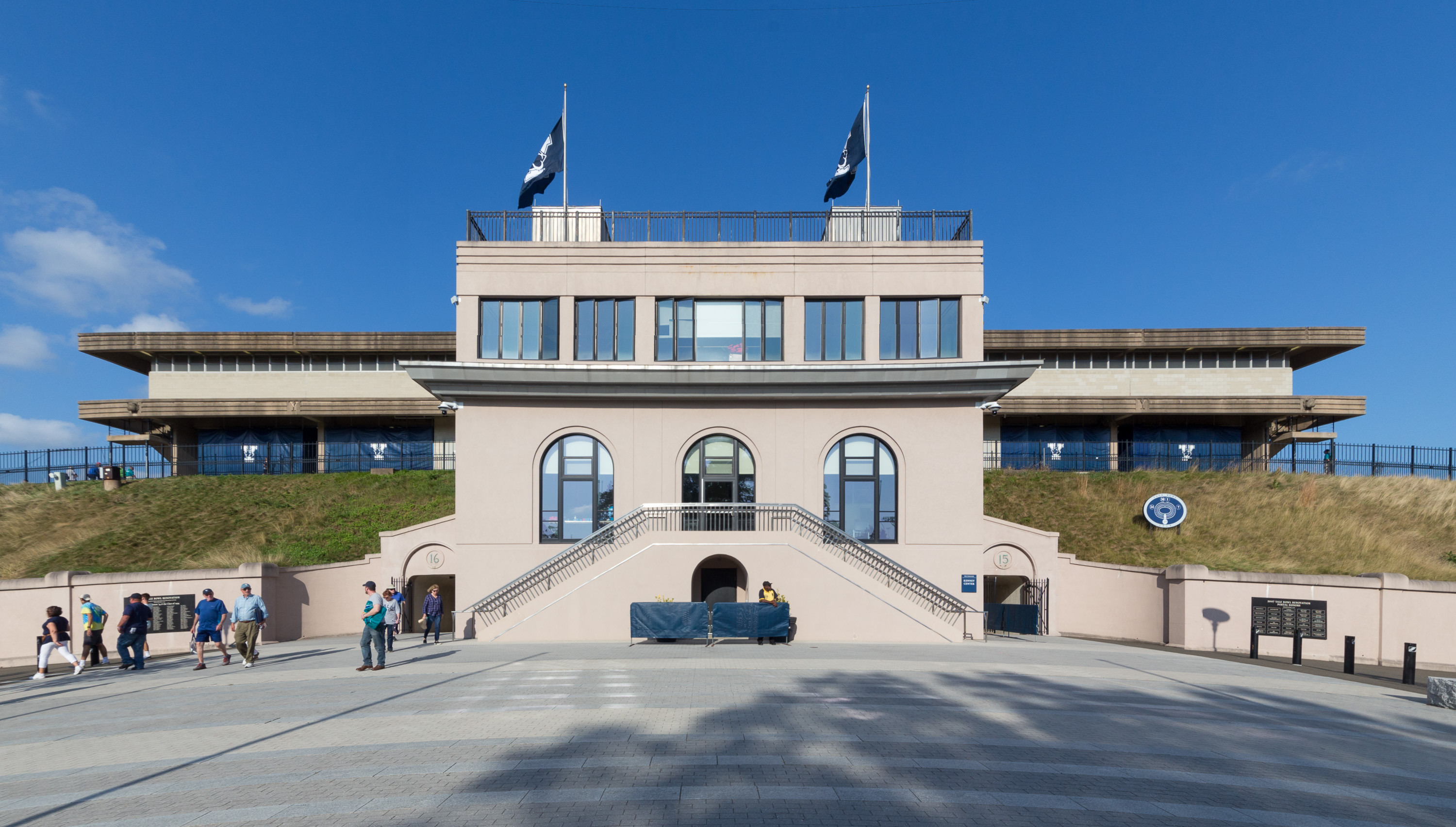
Main entrance, located on west side, 2019

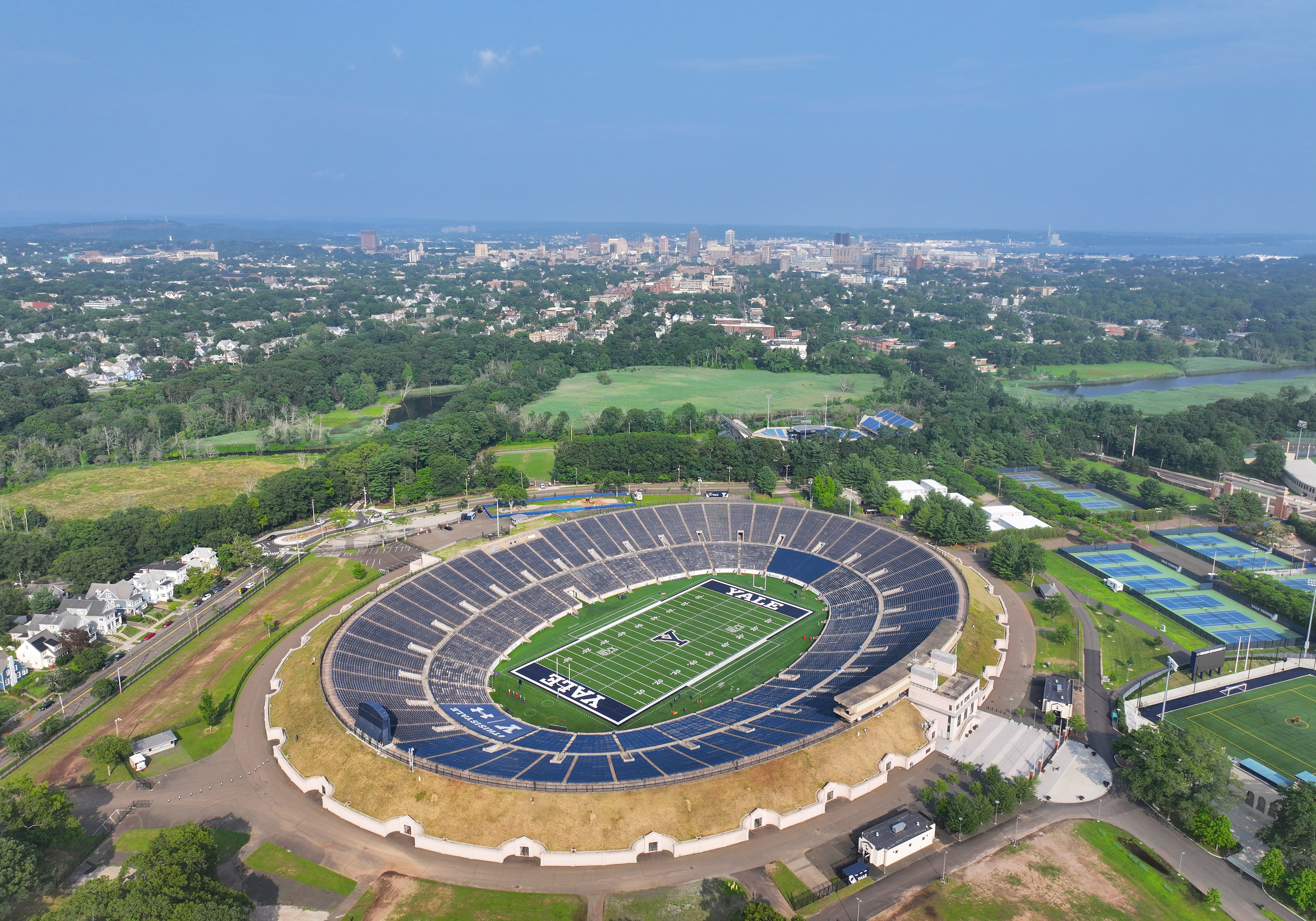
Aerial view, looking at the New Haven skyline

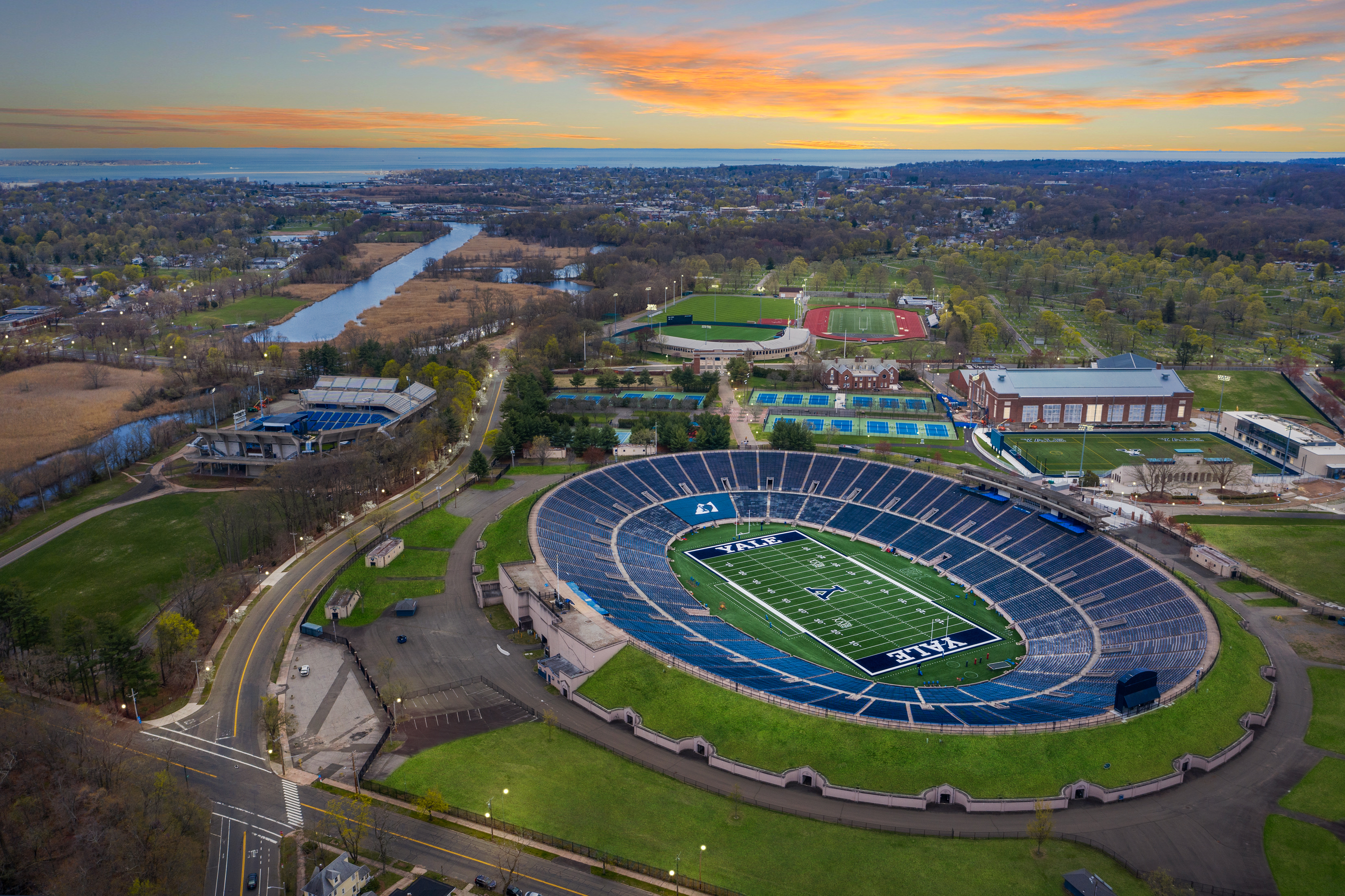
Aerial view, looking south toward Long Island Sound, 2021

== See also ==
- List of NCAA Division I FCS football stadiums
- List of National Historic Landmarks in Connecticut
- National Register of Historic Places listings in New Haven, Connecticut

Preceded by Yankee Stadium	Home of the New York Giants; 1973–1974	Succeeded by Shea Stadium
