= Islanders–Rangers rivalry =

National Hockey League rivalry

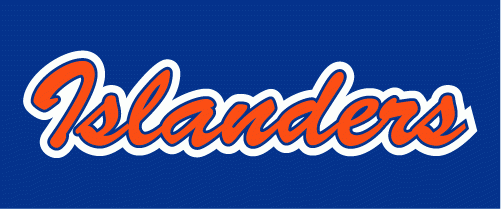
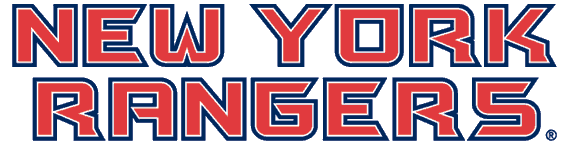
- New York Islanders New York Rangers
- First meeting: October 21, 1972
- Latest meeting: October 6, 2026
- Next meeting: December 20, 2026

Statistics
- Total meetings: 341
- All-time series: 162–150–19–10 (NYR)
- Regular season series: 143–130–19–10 (NYR)
- Postseason results: 20–19 (NYI)
- Largest victory: NYI 10–2 NYR; April 3, 1976
- Longest win streak: NYI W8
- Current win streak: NYR W1

Postseason history
- 1975 preliminary round: Islanders won, 2–1; 1979 semifinals: Rangers won, 4–2; 1981 semifinals: Islanders won, 4–0; 1982 division finals: Islanders won, 4–2; 1983 division finals: Islanders won, 4–2; 1984 division semifinals: Islanders won, 3–2; 1990 division semifinals: Rangers won, 4–1; 1994 conference quarterfinals: Rangers won, 4–0

The Islanders–Rangers rivalry, also known as the Battle of New York, is a National Hockey League (NHL) rivalry between the New York Islanders and New York Rangers. Both teams play in the state of New York, with the Rangers in the New York City borough of Manhattan, and the Islanders in the Long Island county of Nassau near its border with New York City borough of Queens. They are two of the three teams that play in the New York metropolitan area, the other being the New Jersey Devils who play in Newark, New Jersey.

Like the Knicks–Nets rivalry of the National Basketball Association (NBA) and the old Dodgers–Giants rivalry of Major League Baseball (MLB), the two teams are in the same division and thus play several matches together each season. In contrast, the New York Yankees and New York Mets are in different leagues while the New York Jets and New York Giants of the National Football League (NFL) are in different conferences, and as such those teams meet rarely, either during interconference or championship games.

== History ==
=== 1970s ===
The rivalry was established in late 1971, when the National Hockey League awarded a second franchise in the New York metropolitan area. With the impending start of the World Hockey Association in the fall of 1972, the upstart league had plans to place a team, the New York Raiders, in the then-new Nassau Veterans Memorial Coliseum in Nassau County. The NHL did not want competition in the nation's largest metro area, so despite having expanded two years before, the NHL awarded franchises to Atlanta (which ultimately failed and moved to Calgary) and Long Island to preempt the WHA. The fledgling New York Islanders had an extra burden to pay in the form of a $4 million territorial fee to the nearby New York Rangers. In the 1974–75 season, the Islanders made their first postseason appearance while the Rangers qualified for the ninth straight season. The two teams met in the preliminary round. The Islanders won game one in Madison Square Garden, but the Rangers tied the series at one by defeating the Islanders 8–3 on the road. The Islanders won the series 2–1 as they beat the Rangers 4–3 11 seconds into overtime on J. P. Parisé's goal at the Garden. In 1979, the teams squared off again in the playoffs, but this time in the semifinals. The Rangers took game one on the road, but the Islanders tied the series with an overtime win. The Rangers took game three at home, but once again, the Islanders tied the series with another overtime win. The Rangers won games five and six to end the Islanders' season, but lost to Montreal in the Stanley Cup Final.

=== 1980s ===
The two clubs would battle once again in the semifinals of the 1981 Stanley Cup playoffs. The Islanders won the Stanley Cup the previous year, and looked to defend their title. Islanders devastated the Rangers by sweeping the series and winning all four games by at least three goals. The Islanders were crowned Stanley Cup champions once again as they beat the Minnesota North Stars in the Final. The next season, the teams met again in the playoffs, this time in the division finals. The Rangers took game one on the road, but the Islanders won the next three. The Rangers struck back to win game five on the road, but were eliminated in game six. The Islanders swept their opponents in the next two rounds and won the Stanley Cup for the third straight year. The teams met in the division finals yet again in the 1982–83 season. The Islanders took a 2–0 series lead by winning two home games, but then the Rangers tied the series at two by winning their home games. The Islanders won games five and six to move to claim their fourth straight Stanley Cup. In the 1983–84 season, the teams fought in the division semifinals. The Islanders took game one, but the Rangers won games two and three 3–0 and 7–2 respectively. The Islanders won game four, and then won the series 3–2 with an overtime win. This time, the Islanders moved on to the Final, but lost in a rematch to the Oilers. The rivalry remained intense throughout the late 1980s, but only during the regular season. Islanders fans often mocked the Rangers by chanting "1940" to tease them about their Stanley Cup drought, one of the longest championship droughts in NHL history and all of sports.

=== 1990s ===
In the 1989–90 season, the teams met in the division semifinals yet again. The Rangers took games one and two at home, but the Islanders battled hard to win game three in double overtime. The Rangers ended up winning the series 4–1 but lost to the Washington Capitals in the second round. After Islanders legends Bryan Trottier, Mike Bossy, Denis Potvin, Clark Gillies, Brent Sutter, Pat LaFontaine, John Tonelli, Bob Bourne and Bobby Nystrom retired or left the team, the Islanders did not achieve the same success as they did in the 1980s. The Rangers on the other hand, acquired key players like Mark Messier and Adam Graves, as well as drafting key players including Brian Leetch and Alexei Kovalev. The two teams met in the playoff during the 1993–94 season in the conference quarterfinals. The Rangers swept the Islanders, outscoring them 22–3, and then beat the Capitals, New Jersey Devils, and Vancouver Canucks to win their first Stanley Cup since 1940. That was the Islanders' last playoff appearance of the decade. The Rangers gained Wayne Gretzky who helped them back to the conference finals in 1997, but they were eliminated by Philadelphia.

=== 2000s ===
During the 2000s, the Islanders made only four playoff appearances. The Rangers missed the playoffs eight straight years (including the 2004–05 lockout), prior to signing All-Star Jaromír Jágr, and qualifying for the 2006 Stanley Cup playoffs. The Rangers made it to the second round in 2007 and 2008 with the help of Swedish goaltender Henrik Lundqvist. The Islanders made it to the 2007 playoffs, but were eliminated in the first round.

Announced in 2001, the Pat LaFontaine Trophy was awarded to the winner of the Islanders–Rangers regular season series; it is unclear whether the trophy has been acknowledged by either team since the early 2000s.

=== 2010–present ===
The Rangers had an eight-game home winning streak versus the Islanders until the Islanders beat them in a shootout on February 14, 2013. This was balanced by the Islanders winning four games in Madison Square Garden during this time.

The Islanders' first overall draft pick in 2009, John Tavares, scored 20+ goals in the past six seasons and led them back to the playoffs in 2013, 2015 and 2016. On April 13, 2013, during a Rangers–Islanders game at Nassau Coliseum, the Rangers and Islanders were both scoreless in regulation for the first time since 1989, but defenseman Daniel Girardi won it for the Rangers in overtime.

On January 29, 2014, the Rangers defeated the Islanders 2–1 in the third game of the 2014 NHL Stadium Series; that game was held at Yankee Stadium. The winning goal was scored by Daniel Carcillo in the third period.

In the 2015–16 season, the Islanders moved from Nassau Coliseum to the Barclays Center in Brooklyn, officially making it a true intra-city rivalry within New York City. The Islanders then completed their first-ever season sweep of the Rangers, en route to winning their first playoff series since 1993 defeating the Florida Panthers four games to two.

In the 2017–18 season, the Islanders once again swept the Rangers, improving their record to 11–1–0 against them over the previous three seasons.

In the 2018–19 season, the Islanders began to split their home games between Barclays Center and Nassau Coliseum. The use of both arenas continued until the scheduled 2021 completion of their new home, UBS Arena in Elmont, outside the New York City border. All of the Islanders' home games with the Rangers through the 2019–20 season were scheduled to be played at Barclays Center, but on September 23, the Islanders moved seven more games from the Barclays Center, two of which against the Rangers, making it a total of 28 games to be played at Nassau Coliseum.

Due to the COVID-19 pandemic, the Islanders and Rangers played eight times in the 2020–21 season, the most games the teams played against each other in a season since the 2007–08 season. The Islanders won six games, en route to making the playoffs over the Rangers.

In the 2021–22 season, teams played the first game of the rivalry in the newly opened UBS Arena. The Rangers won the inaugural game 4–1, denying the Islanders a chance to beat the Rangers for their first win at UBS Arena. Later in the season, the Islanders would get their revenge, winning both games at Madison Square Garden, and ultimately, both teams finished with a 2–2 record against each other.

Due to changes in the scheduling process, the teams only played three times in the 2022–23 season, all of which were before Christmas. The Islanders, thanks to a third period comeback in the second game out of three, won the overall season series 2–1. The three games the teams played against each other was the fewest number of times the two rivals had played each other in the 50-year history of the rivalry.

== Meetings ==
=== Regular season ===
The Islanders and Rangers play each other four times each regular season, with each team hosting two games. In the late 1970s and throughout the 1980s, the rivalry was mostly one-sided in favor of the dominant Islanders, who ultimately won four Stanley Cup championships in a row during that time. However, since 1994, the rivalry has shifted more towards the Rangers. The Rangers won their fourth Stanley Cup in 1994 and have experienced much playoff success since, including five appearances in the Eastern Conference finals in 1997, 2012, 2014, 2015 and 2022 (where they lost to two of their biggest rivals other than the Islanders, the Philadelphia Flyers (in 1997) and New Jersey Devils (in 2012)), as well as a trip to the Stanley Cup Final in 2014. The Islanders, on the other hand, did not win a playoff series after 1993 until their victory over the Florida Panthers in 2016 but have gone to the Eastern Conference finals in 2020 and 2021. Since the 2015–16 season, the Islanders have won 13 of the last 16 games between the two teams, and at one point had won eight in a row, making the rivalry one-sided in favor of the Islanders as of late.

=== Playoffs ===
In 1975, the Islanders made their first trip to the NHL playoffs, facing the heavily favored Rangers in a best-of-three first-round series. After splitting the first two games, the Islanders won game three, and the series, when J. P. Parisé scored 11 seconds into overtime. The teams met again in the 1979 playoffs; this time the underdog Rangers were victorious, eliminating the heavily favored Islanders in six games and earning a spot in the Stanley Cup Final. This was particularly memorable as it continued the Islanders' reputation for playoff "chokes" despite finishing first in the league during the regular season.

The teams met in the playoffs every year from 1981 to 1984; the Islanders won each series by margins of 4–0, 4–2, 4–2 and 3–2 en route to four Final appearances and three Stanley Cups (in addition to their 1980 win to make it four championships and five Final series in a row). In the 1990s, the teams met twice, with the Rangers winning 4–1 in 1990, and sweeping the Islanders 4–0 in 1994, en route to winning their first Stanley Cup since 1940. The 1994 first-round playoff series is the most recent meeting between the two teams in the playoffs.

=== Alumni Classic ===
Since 2022, the two teams have scheduled alumni games, featuring two 30-minute halves and ex-players. The Islanders won the first and second games, 9–8 and 11–9, respectively. The Rangers won the third game, 6–4, while the Islanders won the 2025 game, 4–2.

== Fan reaction ==
The Rangers' fanbase generally comes from the city's five boroughs, Westchester, Rockland, and Fairfield counties, while the Islanders tend to draw fans from Long Island, specifically the Nassau and Suffolk counties, Brooklyn, and parts of eastern Queens. Fans will frequently direct derisive chants at their rivals during games, regardless of whether the two teams are actually playing each other. At each home game, Ranger fans engage in perhaps their most popular chant: whistling the song "Let's Go Band" and punctuating it with "Potvin sucks!" This is a reference to retired Islander, Hall of Fame defenseman Denis Potvin, who angered Rangers fans by breaking center Ulf Nilsson's ankle. Nilsson never characterized Potvin's hit as dirty and blames his broken ankle on his skate getting caught in a crevice in the ice at Madison Square Garden resulting in one leg taking the full weight of the hit. In a 2009 interview, 30 years after the hit, Nilsson said, "He [Potvin] was always fair. But the ice was never great in the Garden because they had basketball and other events. My foot just got caught. It was a freak thing." Nevertheless, this has not deterred Rangers fans from continuing their chant to this day. Rangers fans also occasionally bring out the chant "Beat your wife, Potvin, beat your wife", a reference to allegations made by his former wife during their divorce proceedings that Potvin committed domestic abuse. Potvin denied this and was never criminally charged. Lastly, Rangers fans taunted Islanders goaltender Rick DiPietro by chanting "DP Sucks!" After the Islanders changed their logo to one closely resembling the Gorton's fisherman, Rangers fans chanted "We want fishsticks" at the Islanders for several years, even after the logo was discarded.

During their sweep of the Rangers in the 1981 semifinals, Islander fans started chanting "1940!" referring to the Rangers having the all-time longest drought without winning the Stanley Cup. This chant was picked up by other NHL fans as well until the Rangers finally won in 1994.

=== Incidents ===
One well-known incident at an Islanders–Flyers game in 2003 turned a holiday promotion at Nassau Coliseum into an on-ice shoving match between Rangers and Islanders fans in Santa suits.

== See also ==
- List of NHL rivalries
- Devils–Rangers rivalry
- Giants–Jets rivalry
- Knicks–Nets rivalry
- Mets–Yankees rivalry
- Hudson River Derby
