= Devils–Rangers rivalry =

National Hockey League rivalry

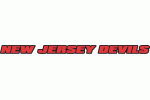
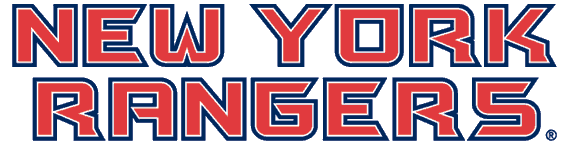
- New Jersey Devils New York Rangers
- First meeting: October 8, 1982
- Latest meeting: October 15, 2026
- Next meeting: December 7, 2026

Statistics
- Total meetings: 284
- All-time series: 136–116–21–11 (NYR) (Note: This does not include the Rangers' combined record of 21–9–6–0 against the Kansas City Scouts and the Colorado Rockies.)
- Regular season series: 115–96–21–11 (NYR)
- Postseason results: 21–20 (NYR)
- Largest victory: NYR 11–2 NJD; October 25, 1984 NYR 9–0 NJD; March 31, 1986
- Longest win streak: NYR W8
- Current win streak: NJD W1

Postseason history
- 1992 division semifinals: Rangers won, 4–3; 1994 conference finals: Rangers won, 4–3; 1997 conference semifinals: Rangers won, 4–1; 2006 conference quarterfinals: Devils won, 4–0; 2008 conference quarterfinals: Rangers won, 4–1; 2012 conference finals: Devils won, 4–2; 2023 first round: Devils won, 4–3

The Devils–Rangers rivalry (also known as the Hudson River rivalry or the Battle of the Hudson River) is a National Hockey League (NHL) rivalry between the New Jersey Devils and New York Rangers. The two teams are called "cross-river rivals." This is because Madison Square Garden in Midtown Manhattan, where the Rangers play, is across the Hudson River and less than 10 miles (16 kilometres) from the Prudential Center in downtown Newark (and previously, the Meadowlands Arena in East Rutherford), the home of the Devils. Travel between both arenas is easily accomplished by both road (usually through the Lincoln Tunnel) and rail (along the Northeast Corridor and PATH).

The Devils and Rangers are two of the three teams that play in the New York City metropolitan area, the other being the New York Islanders. All three teams have fierce, bitter rivalries with each other, as well as with the other (now formerly) Atlantic Division teams, the Philadelphia Flyers and Pittsburgh Penguins.

== History ==
=== Early history ===
The rivalry began in 1982–83 when the Colorado Rockies moved to New Jersey to become the Devils. For the relocation, they were required to pay massive indemnities to the Rangers, New York Islanders and Philadelphia Flyers, geographically-proximate teams, for the right to share New Jersey market. Despite the Devils' overall Stanley Cup playoff superiority since the 1990s, the first three playoff series between these teams were all Rangers victories. Their first playoff meeting occurred during the 1992 Stanley Cup playoffs, when the Presidents' Trophy-winning Rangers survived a seven-game Patrick Division semifinals series with the Devils.

=== Stanley Cup championships of 1994 and 1995 ===
The rivalry's most famous moments, however, are centered around the significance of the teams' meetings during the 1993–94 and 1994–95 seasons.

==== 1994: Rangers win Stanley Cup ====
Although both teams were the top point-getters in the NHL during the Rangers' championship season of 1993–94 (the Presidents' Trophy-winning Rangers netting 112 and the Devils notching 106), the story entering the Eastern Conference finals was the Rangers' 6–0 record against New Jersey that regular season. In the final weeks of the regular season, the Devils were chasing the Rangers for the best record in the NHL. In response, the New York news media pushed Rangers head coach Mike Keenan to push the Rangers to winning the Presidents' Trophy as the League's top regular season team. Keenan replied, "I want to play game seven of the Stanley Cup (Finals) in Madison Square Garden." The Rangers reached the conference finals with relative ease by sweeping their crosstown rivals, the Islanders, and beating the Washington Capitals in five games. In comparison, the Devils' road was much harder as they needed all seven games to oust the Buffalo Sabres in the first round and required six games to eliminate the Boston Bruins in the conference semifinals.

However, all ideas of a quick New York series were soon ended after game one, a 4–3 double overtime victory that was sealed by the Devils' Stéphane Richer. The Rangers responded by routing the Devils 4–0 in game two, and used a double overtime goal by Stéphane Matteau to take a 2–1 lead after game three. After being routed in games four and five, the Rangers faced elimination in New Jersey for game six, with the Devils attempting to make the Stanley Cup Final for the first time in franchise history. Prior to the game, Rangers captain Mark Messier guaranteed a victory in game six at the Meadowlands; with the Rangers down 2–0 to the Devils, Messier scored a hat-trick to tie the series at 3–3 and send it back to New York for the deciding game seven. In game seven, the Devils' Valeri Zelepukin tied the game with 7.7 seconds left in regulation, but thanks to another Stéphane Matteau goal in double overtime, the Rangers won the series and ultimately went on to win the Stanley Cup over the Vancouver Canucks, also in seven games. The first six games were won by the team that lost that respective game in 1992. That trend was reversed when the Rangers won game seven in 1994.

==== 1995: Devils win Stanley Cup ====
The Devils recovered from the crushing defeat to the Rangers in 1994 to win the Stanley Cup the following year in a shocking and improbable sweep of the Detroit Red Wings, though they had to go through another of their own rivals (also a great rival of the Rangers) in the 1995 conference finals, the Philadelphia Flyers, who eliminated the Rangers in the second round, making the rivalry during the 1995–96 season showdowns between the Stanley Cup champions of the previous two seasons.

When both teams won the Stanley Cup in their respective seasons, the Stanley Cup was awarded on their side of the Hudson River (Rangers won at Madison Square Garden in 1994, the Devils at the Meadowlands in 1995). The Devils did not have home ice advantage during their Cup Final. In fact, they were the first team to win the Stanley Cup without home ice advantage in any of the four rounds of the playoffs.

=== 1997 playoffs ===
The third Devils–Rangers playoff series occurred just three years later. The Rangers, led by Mark Messier, Wayne Gretzky, Brian Leetch, and Mike Richter, eliminated the Devils in the 1997 conference semifinals, winning four games in a row after losing game one. In game five, Adam Graves scored an overtime wraparound goal to give the Rangers the series win. New Jersey was limited to just five goals in the five-game series, including two shutout losses.

=== 1998–2006 ===
From the start of 1998, however, rivalry momentum began to shift in favor of the Devils. New Jersey dominated New York during the regular season in the late 1990s and early 2000s. At one point, the Devils had an unbeaten streak against the Rangers throughout 23 regular season games going 15–0–8, starting on February 17, 1997, and ending March 31, 2001, an undefeated streak spanning four years.

On September 19, 2001, the Devils and Rangers played a pre-season game at Madison Square Garden in what was the first sporting event in New York City following the September 11 attacks at the World Trade Center. Players from both teams stood together in solidarity along the red line for a moment of silence prior to the game.

At the end of the 2005–06 season, the Devils won 11 games straight – the second such streak of the season – and capped off the run by winning the Atlantic Division in comeback fashion against the Montreal Canadiens, a division win made all the more exciting by the fact that the Devils had been 22 points out of the lead just three months prior, with many thinking the team would not make the 2006 playoffs. Meanwhile, the Rangers had the division lead for most of the latter part of the season but lost their final five games as the season came to a close. The Devils took the division title from the Rangers by ending the season with one more point than New York. The teams had their fourth playoff meeting in the conference quarterfinals, a four-game sweep by New Jersey over their cross-river rivals for the first time ever in franchise history.

=== 2007–2011 ===
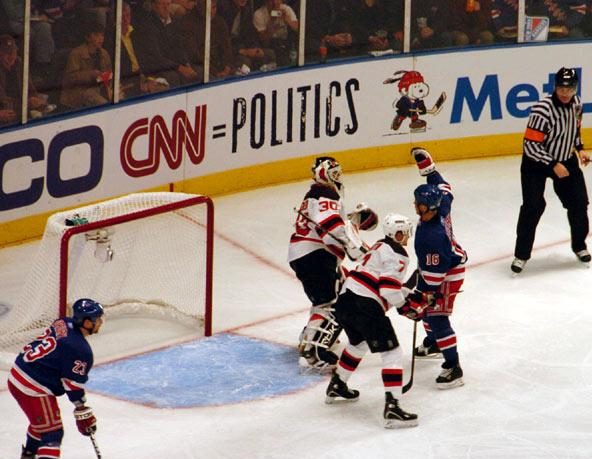
Sean Avery distracts Martin Brodeur during game three of the 2008 Eastern Conference quarterfinals.

Two years later, the teams would meet yet again in the playoffs for the fifth time, in the 2008 conference quarterfinals. After long-time Devil Scott Gomez signed as a free agent with the Rangers prior to the 2007–08 season, he was severely booed by Devils fans at the Prudential Center every time he touched the puck. Gomez responded by scoring three assists in game one and two goals in game four against his former team en route to a Rangers series win. In game three, when his team had a two-man advantage, Ranger Sean Avery screened opposing goaltender Martin Brodeur. While screening is a common tactic, Avery's was unusual in that he was essentially ignoring the play on the ice, instead facing the goaltender while waving his hands and stick in front of him in an attempt to distract him and block his view. Although not illegal, many NHL commentators and players described Avery's actions as inappropriate. The following day, the NHL issued an interpretation of the league's unsportsmanlike conduct rule to cover actions such as the one employed by Avery. Following the Rangers victory in game five of the series during the hand-shake line, Brodeur shook the hand of every Ranger except Avery. When asked what happened after the game, Avery said, "Well, everyone talks about how classy or un-classy I am, and fatso [Brodeur] there just forgot to shake my hand I guess. . . We outplayed him. I outplayed him. We’re going to the second round." That year in the regular season, Avery slid into Brodeur. Brodeur retaliated by shoving Avery, who shoved back and a brawl occurred.

During the 2009–10 season, there was a moment of peace in the rivalry with both captains, Rangers' Chris Drury and Devils' Jamie Langenbrunner, winning silver medals as members the Team USA during the Vancouver Olympics. However, the rivalry was revived because both head coaches, the Rangers' John Tortorella and the Devils' Jacques Lemaire, were on different team's benches – Tortorella was an assistant coach for the Americans, while Lemaire was with Team Canada, which ultimately took home gold over the U.S.

The Rangers won four of six meetings between the two teams in the 2010–11 season, and won the last meeting of the season to make the playoffs. Hours after the Rangers beat the Devils 5–2 in their last game of the regular season on April 9, the Tampa Bay Lightning beat the Carolina Hurricanes 6–2 to help the Rangers reach the 2011 playoffs. Both teams were in opposite directions during the season. The Rangers finished 44–33–5, while the Devils finished the season under .500 for the first time since the 1990–91 season, with a record of 38–39–5 and missed the playoffs.

=== 2012 conference finals ===
The Devils–Rangers series debuted at its latest date since the Devils moved to New Jersey in 1982 during the 2011–12 season. For the previous six seasons, the teams had met at least once in October. In two of the first three meetings of the teams, there have been fights to start the game, which included the third game of the year, were two fights immediately broke-out after the first face-off. Also in the third game, there was a controversial call that negated a goal by Rangers' Derek Stepan due to alleged goaltender interference by Marián Gáborík. Some argue that Gáborík was pushed into goaltender, Brodeur, by ex-Devil Anton Volchenkov, while others argue that the forward did not make an effort to avoid the goaltender, therefore legitimizing the penalty.

The Devils and Rangers met for their final contest of the season on March 19, 2012, at Madison Square Garden. Continuing the trend established in prior games, the game began with three simultaneous fights, and the Rangers went on to win the game, 4–2. With the Devils defeating rival Philadelphia in five games, and the Rangers defeating Washington in seven, the stage was set for a rematch of the 1994 Conference finals between the two in the 2012 conference finals. With the exception of games one and two, the remainder of the series was played on the 18th anniversary of each game of the 1994 conference finals series between the two, and the pattern of wins from games three to five were identical to that of 1994. This pattern was broken when the Devils won game six, 3–2, in overtime on Adam Henrique's game-winner, securing the Devils' first trip to the Stanley Cup Final since their championship season of 2003. However, the Devils would eventually lose the Cup in six games to the Los Angeles Kings.

=== 2012–present ===
The 2012–13 season began with a labor lockout due to the NHL Collective Bargaining Agreement (CBA)'s expiration, with the players and owners struggling to agree on new terms. Although the League's All-Star Game, Winter Classic and almost half of the regular season was lost due to work stoppage, the parties finally agreed to new terms in early 2013 to begin the season in late January. New Jersey won the first game between the two teams, though the Rangers won the remaining three. The Rangers' 4–1 victory on April 21, at home officially ended the Devils' hopes to reach the 2013 playoffs, despite making the Cup Final the previous year.

In the 2013–14 season, the two teams squared off in an outdoor game in Yankees Stadium. After taking a 3–1 lead in the game, the Devils eventually imploded and lost the game 7–3. Throughout the season, New York won two out of five meetings between them that year, while the Devils missed the playoffs for the second year in a row, which had not happened since 1987. The Rangers, on the other hand, finally made it to the Cup Final, which they had not done since 1994. However, New York lost to the Los Angeles Kings, who won their second Cup in three seasons.

In the first half of the 2014–15 season, the Rangers took both meetings between the teams. The first one was a come-from-behind, 4–3 road victory in overtime, while the second was a 3–1 win at the Garden.

On February 22, 2018, the two teams made their first trade together when the Rangers sent Michael Grabner to the Devils in exchange for Yegor Rykov and a second-round pick in the 2018 NHL entry draft.

In the draft lottery for the 2019 NHL entry draft, the Devils received the first, while the Rangers the second overall pick. The Devils selected Jack Hughes, while the Rangers selected Kaapo Kakko. This was seen as a new chapter in the rivalry between the teams.

The two teams met in the 2023 playoffs, making it the seventh playoff series between the two teams. This was the first playoff series between the two teams in which Martin Brodeur was not on the Devils roster. The Devils initially started Vítek Vaněček in the first two games of the series, but after Vaněček struggled, the team started Akira Schmid in game three. The Rangers had a 2–0 series lead, but the Devils won the series in seven games including shutouts by Schmid in games five and seven.

==== 2024 brawl ====
During a 3–1 New York victory on March 11, 2024, Rangers rookie Matt Rempe's rough play led to him being challenged to a fight by Devils enforcer Kurtis MacDermid several times, all of which he refused. Rempe was later ejected after elbowing Devils' defenseman Jonas Siegenthaler so hard that Siegenthaler suffered a concussion and had to leave the game, the second time during the 2023–24 season that illegal rough play by Rempe had injured a Devils' player enough to force him off the ice. Rempe was suspended for the next four games.

It was thus expected that when the teams played again on April 3, there would be an altercation. Rempe and MacDermid were on their teams' starting lines and were seen talking to each other before the opening faceoff, after which the referee made them step apart. When the puck dropped, all five skaters on both teams began fighting each other. Rempe and MacDermid continued well after the others had stopped; head coaches Peter Laviolette and Travis Green were also seen angrily exchanging words on the benches. Rempe, MacDermid and three other players from each team were ejected. The Rangers won the game 4–3.

==== "Instagram hockey" ====
On December 2, 2024, in their first meeting of the 2024–25 season, the Devils defeated the Rangers at Madison Square Garden 5–1. During the first intermission, former Ranger goaltender and current studio analyst for MSG Network Steve Valiquette criticized Devils center Jack Hughes and accused him of showboating and trying to "embarrass" Rangers goaltender Igor Shesterkin. During the first period of the game, Hughes was alone on a breakaway toward goal and used a move called "The Forsberg," named after Hall of Famer Peter Forsberg, where Hughes faked a shot on his forehand to his left and then pulled a hand off his stick to try and sneak the puck past Shesterkin on the right side with his backhand. Even though Shesterkin made the save, Valiquette saw the play as "blatant disrespect" and said Hughes was playing "Instagram hockey." By the end of the game Hughes scored two goals in the second period and had an assist for a three-point night. After the game Hughes responded to questions about Vailiquette's comments saying "I don't even know what that means, like what does that even mean?"

Valiquette was criticized by other fanbases, analysts and former players for his comments and was mocked by the Devils organization on social media. The Devils posted a clip to their social media sites replaying all five of their goals against the Rangers with Valiquette saying "Instagram hockey" over each one.

== Reaction ==
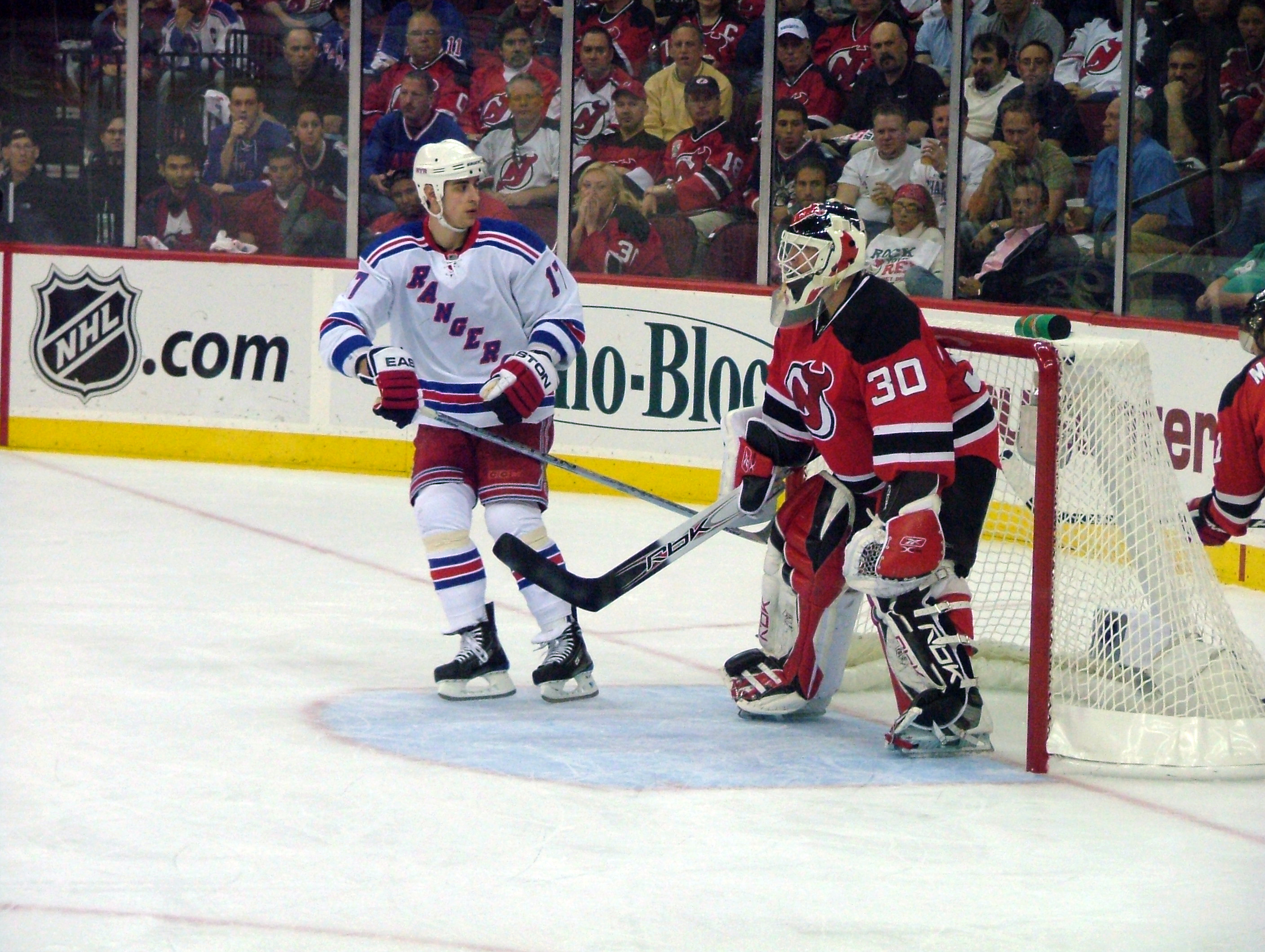
Brandon Dubinsky and Martin Brodeur during their teams' matchup in the 2008 Eastern Conference quarterfinals

Fans on both sides have agreed the rivalry has become even stronger as of late, due in large part to the fact that both teams have shown much more parity towards each other. Many hockey analysts within the media have referred to them as "mirror teams" given their many similarities. Since the 2004–05 NHL lockout, the two teams have met a total of 43 times (as of March 25, 2010), including playoff games.

Many Rangers fans have been seen burning Devils memorabilia after Rangers' victories over the Devils, and lighting their cigarettes with it, while exiting Madison Square Garden. Devils fans, meanwhile, enjoy making confetti which reads "Rangers suck" and handing them out during games formerly at the Continental Airlines Arena and currently at the Prudential Center. The Devils' fans also have a cheer that is yelled and whistled at every game. In response to the "Let's go band"/"Potvin sucks" chant of Rangers fans against the Islanders, the Devils fans at the Prudential Center cheer "Rangers Suck" (and more recently immediately followed with, "Flyers Swallow"). This chant, just like the Potvin chant being heard whether the Rangers are playing the Islanders or not, is heard at every Devils' home game.

The Rangers–Devils rivalry is popular among fans due to its geographic proximity, which is seen as a battle between the neighboring states of New York and New Jersey. Travel ease allows fans to typically follow their respective team across the Hudson to view away games. Fans of both teams have also shown considerable hostility towards each other's goaltender. Rangers fans had often battered former Devils goaltender Martin Brodeur with sarcastic chants of "Marty! Marty! Marty!" after goals scored on him during games between the two teams. Conversely, Devils fans would chant "Henrik! Henrik! Henrik!" at former Rangers goaltender Henrik Lundqvist after the Devils scored on him.

Recently, there have been parting shots taken by players and media at each organization through written words. In Beyond the Crease, an autobiography written by Martin Brodeur, he writes, "I hate the Rangers, and Lou hates them to death." During their 2008 playoff meet, actor/director Kevin Smith was asked to have a blog commenting on the series, which could be read on the NHL's official website. After game three, he wrote:

No Devils fan can truly pinpoint why we hate our cross-river rivals as much as we do. Even so, Devils fans live to hate the Rangers. Sometimes, it feels like a large cross-section of those folks in the stands at the Rock (and formerly at the Meadowlands) aren't there so much to love on the Devils as they are to hate on New York. Even when the boys in blue aren't anywhere near the building, we're still seething about their very existence. You'd think we'd hold a special place in our hearts for the Rangers, as they gave us our first ever win back in 1982. Granted, they don't roll over for us as much as Philly does (except, y'know – in that last game this season), but the Rangers've been hoisted up high on the Devils' pitchfork enough times (the '06 four-zip playoffs come to mind) to warrant at least a degree of affection right?

== In popular culture ==
This rivalry was satirized in pop culture with the Seinfeld episode "The Face Painter" in which David Puddy, a hard-core Devils fan, paints his face red at a playoff game against the Rangers at the Garden, much to the embarrassment of Jerry, Kramer and Elaine.

The rivalry was also seen in the short-lived 2003 sitcom Whoopi, starring Whoopi Goldberg in the episode "Smoke Gets in Your Eyes", where it featured Devils stars Scott Gomez, Jay Pandolfo, and Scott Stevens. Rangers players that were featured on the show included Anson Carter and Darius Kasparitis.

== See also ==
- List of NHL rivalries
- Devils–Flyers rivalry
- Islanders–Rangers rivalry
- Hudson River Derby
