= Major League Baseball schedule =

Scheduling for Major League Baseball

The Major League Baseball (MLB) season schedule consists of 162 games for each of the 30 teams in the American League (AL) and National League (NL), played over approximately six months—a total of 2,430 games, plus the postseason. The regular season runs from late March/early April to late September/early October, followed by the postseason which can run to early November. The season begins with the official Opening Day, and, as of 2018, runs 26½ weeks through the last Sunday of September or first Sunday of October. One or more International Opener games may be scheduled outside the United States or Canada before the official Opening Day. It is possible for a given team to play a maximum of 22 games in the postseason in a given year, provided the team is a wild card and advances to each of the Division Series, Championship Series, and World Series with each series going the distance (3 games in the Wild Card series, 5 games in the Division Series, 7 games each in the League Championship Series/World Series).

The regular season is constructed from series. Due to travel concerns and the sheer number of games, pairs of teams are never scheduled to play single games against each other (except in the instance of making up a postponed game); instead they play games on several consecutive days in the same ballpark. Teams play one mid-week series and one weekend series per week. Depending on the length of the series, mid-week series games are usually scheduled between Monday and Thursday, while weekend games are scheduled between Thursday and Monday. Teams play for 26½ weeks. Due to the mid-week all-star break in July, teams are scheduled to play 27 weekend series and 25 mid-week series for 52 total series (16 divisional series, 20 inter-divisional series, 16 inter-league series). A team's road games are usually grouped into a multi-series road trip; home series are grouped into homestands.

Beginning with the 2023 season, teams play a balanced schedule as follows: thirteen games are played against each of the other four teams in their own division (52 games total), six or seven games against each of the other ten teams in their own league (62 games total), six games against one "geographic rival" from the other league, and three games against each of the other fourteen teams from the other league, for 48 total interleague games. Under this schedule, divisional games consist of two, three or four-game series, intraleague games consist of three or four-game series, and the interleague games consist of two three-game series against the geographic rival (one series home and one away) and a single three-game series against the other interleague opponents (the home team alternating every year).

Note that rainouts and other cancellations are often rescheduled when needed during the season, sometimes as doubleheaders. However, if two teams are scheduled to meet for the final time in the last two weeks of the season, and the game is cancelled, it may not be rescheduled if there is no impact on the divisional or wild card races. Both examples occurred in 2024. The September 29 game between the Houston Astros and the Cleveland Guardians was cancelled due to rain. As the game was scheduled on the last day of the regular season, and it did not affect the postseason seeding for both teams, the game was not rescheduled. In contrast, two NL East division games between the New York Mets and the Atlanta Braves needed to be made up following the last day of the regular season because it played a part in the wild card race involving the Mets, the Braves, and the Arizona Diamondbacks.

From 1953 to 1981, Harry Simmons was responsible for devising the Major League Baseball schedule. Henry and Holly Stephenson, a husband-and-wife team, were in charge of constructing the MLB calendar for over two decades (1981–2004). For the 2005 schedule, the MLB selected the Sports Scheduling Group, a small company located outside Pittsburgh, to craft the schedule for that year. Each year, the MLB considers the scheduling proposals from various external groups.

The upcoming MLB regular season schedule is usually released while the current regular season is ongoing, typically after the All-Star Game or later. In contrast, the National Football League, National Hockey League and National Basketball Association release their schedules in the offseason.

== 19th century ==
This account gives the length of the major league "championship season" schedule by league and year. During this era, there were a number of different leagues that would be deemed Major League.

Prior to the first league schedule in 1877, member clubs scheduled their own matches by mutual arrangement, including championship games necessarily with member clubs, other games with members, and games with non-member clubs. Some may have practically dictated their arrangements with some others, but there was no central control or coordination.

The listed years are those in which the league revised its schedule. For example, the National League (NL) scheduled 84 games during 1879, 1880, 1881, and 1882 – that is, four seasons from 1879, ending before 1883, the next listing. 1876 is listed here for convenience although the NL did not schedule games (see 1871 to 1876, below).

=== National Association of Professional Base Ball Players (1871–1875) ===
The National Association of Professional Base Ball Players (1871–1875) did not schedule games, nor did it control the number of teams, a major reason for its demise after the 1875 season. Clubs paid a $10 entry fee, later $20, to enter the Association for one season, and thereby declare for that year's national championship. Without continuing membership or heavy investment, there was little to deter a team from breaking a commitment, and though it happened, it was mainly due to clubs going out of business.

This list shows the clubs that played the highest number of games in each season. The teams with the most games played often had higher attendance rates.

1871: 33 games (Mutual, New York)
1872: 58 games (Lord Baltimore)
1873: 60 games (Boston)
1874: 71 games (Boston)
1875: 86 games (Hartford)

The leading numbers of games played to a decision were 33, 54, 59, 71, and 82 decisions; by the listed teams except the Mutuals in 1872.

=== National League (first 25 years of 1876–present) ===
The National League organized for 1876 on a different basis than the NAPBBP, granting exclusive memberships to eight clubs that would continue from year to year – it was generally expected, if only because membership would be profitable. But in its first season in 1876, the new league followed its predecessor in merely agreeing that each club would play a certain number of matches to a decision (excluding ties) by a certain date. Boston played 70 games with its quota of ten decisions against every rival. The others achieved 56 to 68 decisions with 64 to 66 for the four western teams as the teams from New York and Philadelphia (eastern) abandoned their schedule-concluding road trips.

| Start year | Total Games | Schedule |
|---|---|---|
| 1876 | 70 | quota of up to 10 games × 7 opponents – matches independently scheduled by clubs (as with the NAPBBP) |
| 1877 | 60 | contraction – 12 games × 5 opponents |
| 1879 | 84 | expansion – 12 games × 7 opponents |
| 1883 | 98 | 14 games × 7 opponents |
| 1884 | 112 | 16 games × 7 opponents |
| 1886 | 126 | 18 games × 7 opponents |
| 1888 | 140 | 20 games × 7 opponents |
| 1892 | 154 | expansion – 14 games × 11 opponents |
| 1893 | 132 | 12 games × 11 opponents |
| 1898 | 154 | 14 games × 11 opponents |

=== American Association (1882–1891) ===
| Start year | Total Games | Schedule |
|---|---|---|
| 1882 | 80 | 16 games × 5 opponents |
| 1883 | 98 | expansion – 14 games × 7 opponents |
| 1884 | 110 | expansion – 10 games × 11 opponents |
| 1885 | 112 | contraction – 16 games × 7 opponents |
| 1886 | 140 | 20 games × 7 opponents |

The AA expanded its schedule to 140 games two years before the National League did so. After 1891 this incarnation of the AA dissolved with four teams bought out and four others joining the NL, nominally creating one big league, the "National League and American Association" of 12 clubs.

=== Union Association (1884) ===
1884: 112 games = 16 games × 7 opponents

=== Players' League (1890) ===
1890: 140 games = 20 games × 7 opponents

== 20th & 21st centuries ==
This account gives the originally announced length of the major league "championship season" schedule by league and year.

This does not include later announced curtailments of play by war (1918) or by strikes and lockouts (1972, 1981, 1994). The schedules for 1995 were revised and shortened from 162 to 144 games, after late resolution of the strike that had begun in 1994 required a delay in the season to accommodate limited spring training.

=== National League ===
| Start year | Total Games | Schedule |
|---|---|---|
| 1900 | 140 | contraction – 20 games × 7 opponents |
| 1904 | 154 | 22 games × 7 opponents |
| 1919 | 140 | 20 games × 7 opponents |
| 1920 | 154 | 22 games × 7 opponents |
| 1962 | 162 | expansion – 18 games × 9 opponents |
| 1969 | 162 | expansion & league splits into 2 divisions: 18 games × 5 opponents in-division (90 games), 12 games × 6 opponents interdivision (72 games) |
| 1993 | 162 | expansion: 13 games × 6 opponents in-division (78 games), 12 games × 7 opponents interdivision (84 games) |
| 1994 | 162 | league splits into 3 divisions – schedules based on 1993 alignments |
| 1995 | 162 | NL East and NL Central divisions: 13 × 4 opponents in-division (52 games), 12 games × 7 opponents interdivision and 13 games × 2 opponents (110 games) NL West division: 13 × 3 opponents in-division (39 games), 12 games × 7 opponents interdivision and 13 games × 3 opponents (123 games) |
| 1997 | 162 | interleague play introduced NL East and NL Central divisions: 12 × 4 opponents in-division (48 games), 11 games × 9 opponents interdivision within same league (99 games), 3 games × 5 opponents interleague (15 games) NL West division: 12 × 3 opponents in-division (36 games), 11 games × 10 opponents interdivision within same league (110 games), 4 games × 4 opponents interleague (16 games) |
| 1998 | 162 | unbalanced alignment – opponents schedules vary every season, with 11 to 13 games per opponent in-division: Start year / Total Games / Schedule; 1998 / 162 / NL East division: 12 games × 4 opponents in-division (48 games), 9 games × 10 opponent and 8 games × 1 opponent interdivision within same league (98 games), 3 games × 4 opponents and 4 games × 1 opponent interleague (16 games) NL Central division: 11 games × 4 opponents and 12 games × 1 opponent in-division (56 games), 9 games × 9 opponents and either 11 or 12 games x 1 opponent interdivision within same league (92 or 93 games), 3 games × 3 opponents and 2 games × 2 opponents or 3 games × 4 opponents and 2 games × 1 opponent interleague (13 or 14 games) NL West division: 12 games × 4 opponents in-division (48 games), 8 games × 1 opponent, 9 games × 9 opponent, and 12 games × 1 opponent or 8 games × 1 opponent, 9 games × 8 opponents, and 11 games × 2 opponents interdivision within same league (101 or 102 games), 3 games × 4 opponents or 3 games × 3 opponents and 4 games × 1 opponent interleague (12 or 13 games); 1999 / 162 / NL East division: 12 games × 2 opponents and 13 games × 2 opponents or 12 games × 1 opponent and 13 games × 3 opponents in-division (50 or 51 games), 9 games × 8 opponents and either 7 games × 3 opponents or 7 games × 2 opponents and 8 games × 1 opponent interdivision within same league (93 or 94 games), 3 games × 4 opponents and 6 games × 1 opponent interleague (18 games) NL Central division: 12 games × 3 opponents and 13 games × 2 opponents or 12 × 2 opponents and 13 games × 3 opponents in-division (84 or 85 games), 9 games × 7 opponents and either 7 games × 3 opponents or 7 games × 2 opponents and 8 games × 1 opponents interdivision within same league (84 or 85 games), 3 games × 5 opponents or 3 games × 3 opponents and 6 games × 1 opponent interleague (15 games) NL West division: 12 games × 2 opponents and 13 games × 2 opponents, or 12 games × 1 opponent and 13 games × 3 opponents, or 13 games × 4 opponents in-division (50, 51, or 52 games), 7 games × 1 opponent, 8 games × 1 opponent, and 9 games × 9 opponents, or 8 games × 2 opponents and 9 games × 9 opponents, or 8 games × 1 opponent and 9 games × 10 opponents interdivision within same league (96, 97, or 98 games), 3 games × 4 opponents or 3 games × 3 opponents and 6 games × 1 opponent interleague (12 or 15 games) |
| 2001 | 162 | unbalanced alignment – opponents schedules vary every season, with 14 to 19 games per opponent in-division: Start year / Total Games / Schedule; 2001 / 162 / NL East division: 19 games × 4 opponents in-division (76 games), 6 games × 9 opponents and 7 games × 2 opponents interdivision within same league (68 games), 3 games × 4 opponents and 6 games × 1 opponent interleague (18 games) NL Central division: 16 games × 1 opponent and 17 games × 4 opponents in-division (84 games), 6 games × 9 opponents and 9 games × 1 opponent interdivision within same league (63 games), 3 games × 5 opponents or 3 games × 3 opponents and 6 games × 1 opponent interleague (15 games) NL West division: 19 games × 4 opponents in-division (76 games), 7 games × 2 opponents and either 6 games × 8 opponents and 9 games × 1 opponent or 6 games × 7 opponents and 9 games × 2 opponents interdivision within same league (71 or 74 games), 3 games × 4 opponents, or 3 games × 5 opponents, or 3 games × 3 opponents and 6 games × 1 opponent interleague (12 or 15 games); 2002 / 162 / NL East division: 19 games × 4 opponents in-division (76 games), 6 games × 9 opponents and 7 games × 2 opponents interdivision within same league (68 games), 3 games × 4 opponents and 6 games × 1 opponent interleague (18 games) NL Central division: 17 games × 2 opponents, 18 games × 1 opponent, and 19 games × 2 opponents in-division (90 games), 6 games × 10 opponents interdivision within same league (60 games), 3 games × 4 opponents or 3 games × 2 opponents and 6 games × 1 opponent interleague (12 games) NL West division: 19 games × 4 opponents in-division (76 games), 6 games × 9 opponents and 7 games × 2 opponents interdivision within same league (68 games), 3 games × 6 opponents or 3 games × 4 opponents and 6 games × 1 opponent interleague (18 games); 2003 / 162 / NL East and NL West divisions: 19 games × 4 opponents in-division (76 games), 6 games × 9 opponents, 7 games × 2 opponents or 6 games × 8 opponents, 7 games × 2 opponents, and 9 games × 1 opponent interdivision within same league (68 or 71 games), 3 games × 5 opponents, or 3 games × 3 opponents and 6 games × 1 opponent, or 3 games × 4 opponents and 6 games × 1 opponent interleague (15 or 18 games) NL Central division: 16 games × 2 opponents, 17 games × 2 opponents, and 18 games × 1 opponent in-division (84 games), 6 games × 10 opponents or 6 games × 8 opponents and 9 games × 2 opponents interdivision within same league (60 or 66 games), 3 games × 4 opponents or 3 games × 2 opponents and 6 games × 1 opponent, or 3 games × 4 opponents and 6 games × 1 opponent interleague (12 or 18 games); 2004 / 162 / NL East and NL West divisions: 19 games × 4 opponents in-division (76 games), 6 games × 9 opponents and 7 games × 2 opponents or 6 games × 10 opponents and 8 games × 1 opponent interdivision within same league (68 games), 3 games × 6 opponents or 3 games × 4 opponents and 6 games × 1 opponent interleague (18 games) NL Central division: 17 games × 2 opponents, 18 games × 1 opponent, and 19 games × 2 opponents in-division (90 games), 6 games × 10 opponents interdivision within same league (60 games), 3 games × 4 opponents or 3 games × 2 opponents and 6 games × 1 opponent interleague (12 games); 2005 / 162 / NL East division: 18 to 19 games × 4 opponents in-division (73, 74, or 75 games), 6 to 10 games × 11 opponents interdivision within same league (69, 72, 73, or 74 games), 5 3-game series × 4 or 5 opponents, or 6 3-game series × 5 opponents interleague (15 or 18 games) NL Central division: 15 games × 1 opponent and 16 games × 4 opponents or 16 games × 5 opponents in-division (79 or 80 games), 6 to 10 games × 10 opponents interdivision within same league (67, 68, or 70 games), 4 3-game series × 4 opponents or 5 3-game series × 4 or 5 opponents interleague (12 or 15 games) NL West division: 18 games × 3 opponents and 19 games × 1 opponent or 18 games × 2 opponents and 19 games × 2 opponents in-division (73 or 74 games), 6 to 10 games × 11 opponents interdivision within same league (70, 71, or 74 games), 3 games × 5 opponents or 3 games × 4 opponents and 6 games × 1 opponent interleague (15 or 18 games); 2006 / 162 / NL East division: 18 to 19 games × 4 opponents in-division (73, 74, or 75 games), 6 to 9 games × 11 opponents interdivision within same league (69, 71, 73, or 74 games), 5 3-game series × 4 or 5 opponents, or 6 3-game series × 5 opponents interleague (15 or 18 games) NL Central division: 15 to 19 games × 5 opponents in-division (77, 78, 81, 82, or 84 games), 6 to 9 games × 10 opponents interdivision within same league (63, 65, 66, 67, or 69 games), 5 3-game series × 4 or 5 opponents or 6 3-game series × 5 opponents interleague (15 or 18 games) NL West division: 18 games × 2 opponents and 19 games × 2 opponents or 18 games × 1 opponent and 19 games × 3 opponents in-division (74 or 75 games), 6 to 10 games × 11 opponents interdivision within same league (72 or 73 games), 3 games × 5 opponents or 3 games × 3 opponents and 6 games × 1 opponent interleague (15 games) |
| 2007 | 162 | unbalanced alignment – opponents schedules vary every season, NL East & NL West divisions playing 18 games per opponent and with NL Central division playing 15 to 18 games per opponent, each in-division: Start year / Total Games / Schedule; 2007 / 162 / NL East division: 18 games × 4 opponents in-division (72 games), 5 to 10 games × 11 opponents interdivision within same league (72 or 75 games), 5 3-game series × 4 or 5 opponents, or 6 3-game series × 5 opponents interleague (15 or 18 games) NL Central division: 15 to 18 games × 5 opponents in-division (79 or 80 games), 5 to 9 games × 10 opponents interdivision within same league (65, 67, 68, or 71 games), 4 3-game series × 3 opponents, 5 3-game series × 4 or 5 opponents, or 6 3-game series × 5 opponents interleague (12, 15, or 18 games) NL West division: 18 games × 4 opponents in-division (72 games), 5 to 10 games × 11 opponents interdivision within same league (72 or 75 games), 5 3-game series × 3 or 4 opponents, or 6 3-game series × 6 opponents interleague (15 or 18 games); 2008 / 162 / NL East division: 18 games × 4 opponents in-division (72 games), 5 to 9 games × 11 opponents interdivision within same league (72 or 75 games), 5 3-game series × 4 or 5 opponents, or 6 3-game series × 5 opponents interleague (15 or 18 games) NL Central division: 15 to 18 games × 5 opponents in-division (77, 78, 79, 81, or 82 games), 5 to 9 games × 10 opponents interdivision within same league (65, 66, 68, 69, or 70 games), 5 3-game series × 4 or 5 opponents or 6 3-game series × 5 opponents interleague (15 or 18 games) NL West division: 18 games × 4 opponents in-division (72 games), 5 to 9 games × 11 opponents interdivision within same league (72 or 75 games), 5 3-game series × 4 or 5 opponents, or 6 3-game series × 5 opponents interleague (15 or 18 games); 2009 / 162 / NL East division: 18 games × 4 opponents in-division (72 games), 5 to 9 games × 11 opponents interdivision within same league (72 or 75 games), 6 games × 1 opponent and either 3 games × 4 opponents or 3 games × 5 opponents interleague (15 or 18 games) NL Central division: 14 to 18 games × 5 opponents in-division (77, 78, 79, or 80 games), 5 to 9 games × 10 opponents interdivision within same league (67, 68, 69, or 70 games), 3 games × 5 opponents or 3 games × 3 opponents and 6 games × 1 opponent interleague (15 games) NL West division: 18 games × 4 opponents in-division (72 games), 5 to 9 games × 11 opponents interdivision within same league (72 or 75 games), 5 3-game series × 4 or 5 opponents, or 6 3-game series × 5 opponents interleague (15 or 18 games); 2010 / 162 / NL East division: 18 games × 4 opponents in-division (72 games), 5 to 9 games × 11 opponents interdivision within same league (72 or 75 games), 5 3-game series × 4 or 5 opponents, or 6 3-game series × 5 opponents interleague (15 or 18 games) NL Central division: 14 to 18 games × 5 opponents in-division (77, 78, or 79 games), 5 to 9 games × 10 opponents interdivision within same league (65, 68, 69, or 70 games), 5 3-game series × 4 or 5 opponents or 6 3-game series × 5 opponents interleague (15 or 18 games) NL West division: 18 games × 4 opponents in-division (72 games), 5 to 9 games × 11 opponents interdivision within same league (75 games), 3 games × 5 opponents or 3 games × 4 opponents and 6 games × 1 opponent interleague (15 games); 2011 / 162 / NL East division: 18 games × 4 opponents in-division (72 games), 5 to 9 games × 11 opponents interdivision within same league (72 or 75 games), 5 3-game series × 4 opponents, or 5 or 6 3-game series × 5 opponents interleague (15 or 18 games) NL Central division: 15 to 18 games × 5 opponents in-division (77, 78, or 79 games), 5 to 9 games × 10 opponents interdivision within same league (65, 67, 68, or 69 games), 5 3-game series × 4 or 5 opponents or 6 3-game series × 5 opponents interleague (15 or 18 games) NL West division: 18 games × 4 opponents in-division (72 games), 5 to 9 games × 11 opponents interdivision within same league (75 games), 5 3-game series × 4 or 5 opponents or 6 3-game series × 6 opponents interleague (15 or 18 games); 2012 / 162 / NL East division: 18 games × 4 opponents in-division (72 games), 5 to 9 games × 11 opponents interdivision within same league (72 or 75 games), 5 or 6 3-game series × 4 or 5 opponents interleague (15 or 18 games) NL Central division: 15 to 18 games × 5 opponents in-division (77, 79, or 81 games), 5 to 11 games × 10 opponents interdivision within same league (63, 66, 68, or 70 games), 6 games × 1 opponent and either 3 games × 3 opponents or 3 games × 4 opponents interleague (15 or 18 games) NL West division: 18 games × 4 opponents in-division (72 games), 5 to 11 games × 11 opponents interdivision within same league (75 games), 3 games × 5 opponents or 3 games × 3 opponents and 6 games × 1 opponent interleague (15 games) |
| 2013 | 162 | realignment – each division now has 5 teams 19 games × 4 opponents in-division (76 games), 6 games × 4 opponents and 7 games × 6 opponents interdivision within same league (66 games), 20 interleague games |
| 2020 | 60 | 10 games × 4 opponents in-division (40 games), 20 interleague games |
| 2021 | 162 | 19 games × 4 opponents in-division (76 games), 6 games × 4 opponents and 7 games × 6 opponents interdivision within same league (66 games), 20 interleague games |
| 2023 | 162 | 13 games × 4 opponents in-division (52 games), 6 games × 6 opponents and 7 games × 4 opponents interdivision within same league (64 games), 4 games × 1 interleague rival opponent and 3 games × 14 interleague opponents (46 games) |
| 2025 | 162 | 13 games × 4 opponents in-division (52 games), 6 games × 8 opponents and 7 games × 2 opponents interdivision within same league (62 games), 6 games × 1 interleague rival opponent and 3 games × 14 interleague opponents (48 games) |

=== American League ===
| Start year | Total Games | Schedule |
|---|---|---|
| 1901 | 140 | 20 games × 7 opponents |
| 1904 | 154 | 22 games × 7 opponents |
| 1919 | 140 | 20 games × 7 opponents |
| 1920 | 154 | 22 games × 7 opponents |
| 1961 | 162 | expansion – 18 games × 9 opponents |
| 1969 | 162 | expansion & league splits into 2 divisions: 18 games × 5 opponents in-division (90 games), 12 games × 6 opponents interdivision (72 games) |
| 1977 | 162 | expansion: 15 games × 6 opponents in-division (90 games), 10 games × 5 opponents and 11 games × 2 opponents interdivision (72 games) |
| 1979 | 162 | 13 games × 6 opponents in-division (78 games), 12 games × 7 opponents interdivision (84 games) |
| 1994 | 162 | league splits into 3 divisions – schedules based on 1993 alignments |
| 1995 | 162 | AL East and AL Central divisions: 13 × 4 opponents in-division (52 games), 12 games × 7 opponents interdivision and 13 games × 2 opponents (110 games) AL West division: 13 × 3 opponents in-division (39 games), 12 games × 7 opponents interdivision and 13 games × 3 opponents (123 games) |
| 1997 | 162 | interleague play introduced AL East and AL Central divisions: 12 × 4 opponents in-division (48 games), 11 games × 9 opponents interdivision within same league (99 games), 3 games × 5 opponents interleague (15 games); AL West division: 12 × 3 opponents in-division (36 games), 11 games × 10 opponents interdivision within same league (110 games), 4 games × 4 opponents interleague (16 games) |
| 1998 | 162 | unbalanced alignment – opponents schedules vary every season, with 12 to 13 games per opponent in-division: Start year / Total Games / Schedule; 1998 / 162 / AL East division: 12 games × 4 opponents in-division (48 games), 10 games × 1 opponent and 11 games × 8 opponent interdivision within same league (98 games), 3 games × 4 opponents and 4 games × 1 opponent interleague (16 games) AL Central division: 12 games × 4 opponents in-division (48 games), 10 games × 1 opponent and 11 games × 8 opponent interdivision within same league (98 games), 3 games × 4 opponents and 2 games × 2 opponents interleague (16 games) AL West division: 12 games × 3 opponents in-division (36 games), 11 games × 10 opponents interdivision within same league (110 games), 3 games × 4 opponents or 4 games × 1 opponent interleague (16 games); 1999 / 162 / AL East division: 12 games × 3 opponents and 13 games × 1 opponents or 12 games × 2 opponent and 13 games × 2 opponents in-division (49 or 50 games), 12 games × 3 opponents and either 9 games × 2 opponents and 10 games × 4 opponents or 9 games × 1 opponent, 10 games × 5 opponents interdivision within same league (94 or 95 games), 3 games × 4 opponents and 6 games × 1 opponent interleague (18 games) AL Central division: 12 games × 4 opponents or 12 games × 3 opponents and 13 games × 1 opponent in-division (48 or 49 games), 12 games × 3 opponents and either 9 games × 1 opponent and 10 games × 5 opponents or 10 games × 6 opponents interdivision within same league (95 or 96 games), 3 games × 6 opponents or 3 games × 4 opponents and 6 games × 1 opponent interleague (18 games) AL West division: 12 games × 3 opponents or 12 games × 2 opponents and 13 games × 1 opponent in-division (36 or 37 games), 12 games × 4 opponents and either 9 games × 1 opponent and 10 games × 5 opponents or 10 games × 6 opponents interdivision within same league (107 or 108 games), 3 games × 4 opponents and 6 games × 1 opponent interleague (18 games); 2000 / 162 / AL East division: 12 games × 3 opponents and 13 games × 1 opponents or 12 games × 2 opponent and 13 games × 2 opponents in-division (49 or 50 games), 12 games × 3 opponents and either 9 games × 2 opponents and 10 games × 4 opponents or 9 games × 1 opponent, 10 games × 5 opponents interdivision within same league (94 or 95 games), 3 games × 4 opponents and 6 games × 1 opponent interleague (18 games) AL Central division: 12 games × 4 opponents or 12 games × 3 opponents and 13 games × 1 opponent, or 12 games × 2 opponents and 13 games × 2 opponents, or 12 games × 1 opponent and 13 games × 3 opponents in-division (48, 49, 50, or 51 games), 12 games × 3 opponents and either 9 games × 3 opponents and 10 games × 3 opponents, 9 games × 2 opponents and 10 games × 4 opponents, 9 games × 1 opponent and 10 games × 5 opponents, or 10 games × 6 opponents interdivision within same league (93, 94, 95, or 96 games), 3 games × 6 opponents or 3 games × 4 opponents and 6 games × 1 opponent interleague (18 games) AL West division: 12 games × 3 opponents or 12 games × 1 opponents and 13 games × 2 opponents in-division (36 or 38 games), 12 games × 4 opponents and either 9 games × 2 opponents and 10 games × 4 opponents or 10 games × 6 opponents interdivision within same league (106 or 108 games), 3 games × 4 opponents and 6 games × 1 opponent interleague (18 games) |
| 2001 | 162 | unbalanced alignment – opponents schedules vary every season, with 18 to 20 games per opponent in-division: Start year / Total Games / Schedule; 2001 / 162 / AL East division: 19 games × 4 opponents in-division (76 games), 6 games × 3 opponents, 7 games × 2 opponents, and 9 × 4 opponents interdivision within same league (68 games), 3 games × 4 opponents and 6 games × 1 opponent interleague (18 games) AL Central division: 19 games × 4 opponents in-division (76 games), 6 games × 3 opponents, 7 games × 2 opponents, and 9 × 4 opponents interdivision within same league (68 games), 3 games × 6 opponents or 3 games × 4 opponents and 6 games × 1 opponent interleague (18 games) AL West division: 19 games × 2 opponents and 20 × games × 1 opponent in-division (58 games), 7 games × 2 opponents and 9 games × 8 opponents interdivision within same league (86 games), 3 games × 4 opponents and 6 games × 1 opponent interleague (18 games); 2002 / 162 / AL East division: 19 games × 4 opponents in-division (76 games), 6 games × 3 opponents, 7 games × 2 opponents, and 9 × 4 opponents interdivision within same league (68 games), 3 games × 4 opponents and 6 games × 1 opponent interleague (18 games) AL Central division: 19 games × 4 opponents in-division (76 games), 6 games × 3 opponents, 7 games × 2 opponents, and 9 × 4 opponents interdivision within same league (68 games), 3 games × 6 opponents or 3 games × 4 opponents and 6 games × 1 opponent interleague (18 games) AL West division: 19 games × 2 opponents and 20 × games × 1 opponent in-division (58 games), 7 games × 2 opponents and 9 games × 8 opponents interdivision within same league (86 games), 3 games × 6 opponents or 3 games × 4 opponents and 6 games × 1 opponent interleague (18 games); 2003 / 162 / AL East division: 19 games × 4 opponents in-division (76 games), 6 games × 3 opponents, 7 games × 2 opponents, and 9 × 4 opponents interdivision within same league (68 games), 3 games × 6 opponents or 3 games × 4 opponents and 6 games × 1 opponent interleague (18 games) AL Central division: 19 games × 4 opponents in-division (76 games), 6 games × 3 opponents, 7 games × 2 opponents, and 9 × 4 opponents interdivision within same league (68 games), 3 games × 6 opponents or 3 games × 4 opponents and 6 games × 1 opponent interleague (18 games) AL West division: 19 games × 2 opponents and 20 × games × 1 opponent in-division (58 games), 7 games × 2 opponents and 9 games × 8 opponents interdivision within same league (86 games), 3 games × 4 opponents and 6 games × 1 opponent interleague (18 games); 2004 / 162 / AL East division: 19 games × 4 opponents in-division (76 games), 6 games × 3 opponents, 7 games × 2 opponents, and 9 × 4 opponents interdivision within same league (68 games), 3 games × 6 opponents or 3 games × 4 opponents and 6 games × 1 opponent interleague (18 games) AL Central division: 19 games × 4 opponents in-division (76 games), 6 games × 3 opponents, 7 games × 2 opponents, and 9 × 4 opponents interdivision within same league (68 games), 3 games × 6 opponents or 3 games × 4 opponents and 6 games × 1 opponent interleague (18 games) AL West division: 19 games × 2 opponents and 20 × games × 1 opponent in-division (58 games), 7 games × 2 opponents and 9 games × 8 opponents interdivision within same league (86 games), 3 games × 6 opponents or 3 games × 4 opponents and 6 games × 1 opponent interleague (18 games) |
| 2005 | 162 | unbalanced alignment – opponents schedules vary every season, AL East & AL Central divisions playing 18 games per opponent and with AL West division playing 19 games per opponent, each in-division: Start year / Total Games / Schedule; 2005 / 162 / AL East division: 18 to 19 games × 4 opponents in-division (73, 74, or 75 games), 6 to 10 games × 9 opponents interdivision within same league (69, 70, or 71 games), 3 games × 6 opponents or 3 games × 4 opponents and 6 games × 1 opponent interleague (18 games) AL Central division: 18 games × 2 opponents and 19 games × 2 opponents or 18 games × 1 opponent and 19 games × 3 opponents in-division (74 or 75 games), 6 to 10 games × 9 opponents interdivision within same league (69 or 70 games), 3 games × 6 opponents or 3 games × 4 opponents and 6 games × 1 opponent interleague (18 games) AL West division: 18 to 19 games × 3 opponents in-division (55, 56, or 57 games), 6 to 10 games × 9 opponents interdivision within same league (87, 88, or 89 games), 3 games × 4 opponents and 6 games × 1 opponent interleague (18 games); 2006 / 162 / AL East division: 18 games × 2 opponents and 19 games × 2 opponents or 18 games × 1 opponent and 19 games × 3 opponents in-division (74 or 75 games), 6 to 10 games × 9 opponents interdivision within same league (69 or 70 games), 3 games × 6 opponents or 3 games × 4 opponents and 6 games × 1 opponent interleague (18 games) AL Central division: 18 to 19 games × 4 opponents in-division (74, 75, or 76 games), 6 to 10 games × 9 opponents interdivision within same league (68, 69, or 70 games), 3 games × 6 opponents or 3 games × 4 opponents and 6 games × 1 opponent interleague (18 games) AL West division: 19 games × 3 opponents in-division (57 games), 6 to 10 games × 10 opponents interdivision within same league (87 games), 3 games × 6 opponents or 3 games × 4 opponents and 6 games × 1 opponent interleague (18 games); 2007 / 162 / AL East division: 18 games × 4 opponents in-division (72 games), 6 to 10 games × 9 opponents interdivision within same league (72 games), 3 games × 4 opponents and 6 games × 1 opponent interleague (18 games) AL Central division: 18 × 4 opponents in-division (72 games), 6 to 10 games × 9 opponents interdivision within same league (72 games), 3 games × 6 opponents or 3 games × 4 opponents and 6 games × 1 opponent interleague (18 games) AL West division: 19 games × 3 opponents in-division (57 games), 6 to 10 games × 10 opponents interdivision within same league (87 games), 3 games × 4 opponents and 6 games × 1 opponent interleague (18 games); 2008 / 162 / AL East division: 18 games × 4 opponents in-division (72 games), 6 to 10 games × 9 opponents interdivision within same league (72 games), 3 games × 4 opponents and 6 games × 1 opponent interleague (18 games) AL Central division: 18 × 4 opponents in-division (72 games), 5 to 10 games × 9 opponents interdivision within same league (72 games), 3 games × 6 opponents or 3 games × 4 opponents and 6 games × 1 opponent interleague (18 games) AL West division: 19 games × 3 opponents in-division (57 games), 5 to 10 games × 10 opponents interdivision within same league (87 games), 3 games × 6 opponents or 3 games × 4 opponents and 6 games × 1 opponent interleague (18 games); 2009 / 162 / AL East division: 18 games × 4 opponents in-division (72 games), 5 to 10 games × 9 opponents interdivision within same league (72 games), 3 games × 4 opponents and 6 games × 1 opponent interleague (18 games) AL Central division: 18 × 4 opponents in-division (72 games), 5 to 10 games × 9 opponents interdivision within same league (72 games), 3 games × 6 opponents or 3 games × 4 opponents and 6 games × 1 opponent interleague (18 games) AL West division: 19 games × 3 opponents in-division (57 games), 6 to 10 games × 10 opponents interdivision within same league (87 games), 3 games × 4 opponents and 6 games × 1 opponent interleague (18 games); 2010 / 162 / AL East and AL Central divisions: 18 × 4 opponents in-division (72 games), 5 to 10 games × 9 opponents interdivision within same league (72 games), 3 games × 6 opponents or 3 games × 4 opponents and 6 games × 1 opponent interleague (18 games) AL West division: 19 games × 3 opponents in-division (57 games), 5 to 10 games × 10 opponents interdivision within same league (87 games), 3 games × 4 opponents and 6 games × 1 opponent interleague (18 games); 2011 / 162 / AL East and AL Central divisions: 18 × 4 opponents in-division (72 games), 6 to 10 games × 9 opponents interdivision within same league (72 games), 3 games × 6 opponents or 3 games × 4 opponents and 6 games × 1 opponent interleague (18 games) AL West division: 19 games × 3 opponents in-division (57 games), 6 to 10 games × 10 opponents interdivision within same league (87 games), 3 games × 4 opponents and 6 games × 1 opponent interleague (18 games); 2012 / 162 / AL East division: 18 × 4 opponents in-division (72 games), 6 to 10 games × 9 opponents interdivision within same league (72 games), 3 games × 6 opponents or 3 games × 4 opponents and 6 games × 1 opponent interleague (18 games) AL Central division: 18 × 4 opponents in-division (72 games), 6 to 10 games × 9 opponents interdivision within same league (72 games), 3 games × 4 opponents and 6 games × 1 opponent interleague (18 games) AL West division: 19 games × 3 opponents in-division (57 games), 6 to 10 games × 10 opponents interdivision within same league (87 games), 3 games × 4 opponents and 6 games × 1 opponent interleague (18 games) |
| 2013 | 162 | realignment – each division now has 5 teams 19 games × 4 opponents in-division (76 games), 6 games × 4 opponents and 7 games × 6 opponents interdivision within same league (66 games), 20 interleague games |
| 2020 | 60 | 10 games × 4 opponents in-division (40 games), 20 interleague games |
| 2021 | 162 | 19 games × 4 opponents in-division (76 games), 6 games × 4 opponents and 7 games × 6 opponents interdivision within same league (66 games), 20 interleague games |
| 2023 | 162 | 13 games × 4 opponents in-division (52 games), 6 games × 6 opponents and 7 games × 4 opponents interdivision within same league (64 games), 4 games × 1 interleague rival opponent and 3 games × 14 interleague opponents (46 games) |
| 2025 | 162 | 13 games × 4 opponents in-division (52 games), 6 games × 8 opponents and 7 games × 2 opponents interdivision within same league (62 games), 6 games × 1 interleague rival opponent and 3 games × 14 interleague opponents (48 games) |

== Recent season schedules ==
Since 1998, there have been 30 major league teams with a single advance schedule for every season that comprises 2,430 games. Each team plays 162 games, 81 as the "home" team, 81 as the "visitor". (This is true even on the rare occasion when a game is played at a ballpark not home to either team.) Occasionally, the advance schedule is subsequently altered due to a game postponement or a one-game tie-breaker to determine which team will play in the postseason.

=== 1998 to 2012 ===
Before 2013, the schedule included 252 "interleague games" (224 games in 1998) that matched one team from the American League and one from the National League; the other 2,178 games (2,206 games in 1998) matched a pair from within one league. About half of the latter matched teams from within one division and about half matched teams from different divisions in one league. These interleague games were played from mid-to-late May to late June or early July.

==== 1998 to 2004 ====
There were different formats nearly every year between 1998 and 2004.

From 1998 to 2000, every pair of division rivals across all six divisions saw 11 or 12 games.

From 2001 to 2004, every pair of division rivals from the divisions with five teams (AL East, AL Central, NL East, and NL West) saw 19 games. The AL West, which had four teams, saw 19 or 20 games, while the NL Central, which had six teams, would vary between 16 and 19 games, depending on the season.

==== 2005 to 2012 ====
From 2005 to 2012, the NL Central, which still had six teams, saw every pair of division rivals play and where from 14 to 19 games. Within the other, smaller divisions of four or five, every pair of teams played 18 or 19 games. This period also saw MLB lax on having a formulaic, stringent numbers of games for teams playing other divisions with the same league (as they did from 1998 to 2004), resulting in a wide variety of pairings. For example, in 2012, against each of their 10 interdivision opponents, Pittsburgh Pirates had 2 pairings of 5 games, 3 pairings of 6 games, and 5 pairings of 7 games, while their division rival St. Louis Cardinals had 4 pairings of 6 games, 5 pairings of 7 games, and 1 pairing of 11 games.

Every season in this period had various different combinations of pairings from season to season for the entire league. For example, the 2005 season saw the following pairings:

Division games (1,091). There were 61 pairs of teams from within one division.

- 25 pairings played 19 games each (475 games)
- 21 pairings played 18 games each (378 games)
- 13 pairings played 16 games each (208 games) – most NL Central pairings
- 2 pairings played 15 games each (30 games) – two NL Central pairings
- Total: 1,091 games.

Other intraleague games (1,087). There were 150 pairs of teams from two different divisions within one league.

- 23 pairings played 10 games each (230 games)
- 15 pairings played 9 games each (135 games)
- 8 pairings played 8 games each (64 games)
- 34 pairings played 7 games each (238 games)
- 70 pairings played 6 games each (420 games)
- Total: 1,087 games.

==== Interleague play ====
The 1997 season saw the introduction of regular season interleague play, consisting of 50 three-game series in the East and Central divisions and 16 four-game series in the West divisions.

The 1998 season saw 56 three-game series and 28 two-game series across all divisions, 18 of said two-game series were home-and-home (only in the East and West divisions).

From the 1999 season to the 2012 season, the schedule for interleague play comprised 84 three-game series, divided as six series (18 games) for each of fourteen AL teams and between four and six for each of sixteen NL teams.

Among the 224 interleague pairs of teams, there were several matchups that were scheduled in two three-game series "home-and-home", or one at each home ballpark. While some of these were one-off for scheduling purposes, many of these were held nearly every season. Many of these special "home-and-home" series found their purpose because the teams were either in the same city or metro area, neighboring cities, teams which wholly or partially shared territorial rights, or, in the case of Canada, were between the country's only two teams. Some repeating matchups were based on greater distances and existed for scheduling reasons (such as Seattle vs. San Diego).

These special local and regional series accounted for anywhere from 9 to 14 matchups for a total of 54 to 84 interleague games each season (36 interleague games in 1998 resulting from 9 "home-and-home" 2-game-each matchups), The other 168 to 198 interleague games (188 in 1998) were largely determined by rotation.

Total home-and-home series matchups between 1998 and 2012
| Total | AL Team | NL Team | Seasons | Notes |
|---|---|---|---|---|
| 15 | Anaheim/Los Angeles Angels | Los Angeles Dodgers | 1998, 1999, 2000, 2001, 2002, 2003, 2004, 2005, 2006, 2007, 2008, 2009, 2010, 2011, 2012 | Freeway Series |
| 15 | Oakland Athletics | San Francisco Giants | 1998, 1999, 2000, 2001, 2002, 2003, 2004, 2005, 2006, 2007, 2008, 2009, 2010, 2011, 2012 | Bay Bridge Series |
| 14 | Chicago White Sox | Chicago Cubs | 1999, 2000, 2001, 2002, 2003, 2004, 2005, 2006, 2007, 2008, 2009, 2010, 2011, 2012 | Crosstown Classic, between South Side and North Side, respectively |
| 14 | Tampa Bay (Devil) Rays | Florida/Miami Marlins | 1998, 1999, 2000, 2001, 2002, 2004, 2005, 2006, 2007, 2008, 2009, 2010, 2011, 2012 | Citrus Series |
| 14 | New York Yankees | New York Mets | 1999, 2000, 2001, 2002, 2003, 2004, 2005, 2006, 2007, 2008, 2009, 2010, 2011, 2012 | Mets–Yankees rivalry (Subway Series), with teams located in the boroughs of the Bronx and Queens, respectively. |
| 13 | Seattle Mariners | San Diego Padres | 1998, 1999, 2000, 2001, 2003, 2005, 2006, 2007, 2008, 2009, 2010, 2011, 2012 | Vedder Cup |
| 12 | Cleveland Indians | Cincinnati Reds | 1999, 2000, 2001, 2004, 2005, 2006, 2007, 2008, 2009, 2010, 2011, 2012 | Ohio Cup |
| 12 | Texas Rangers | Houston Astros | 2001, 2002, 2003, 2004, 2005, 2006, 2007, 2008, 2009, 2010, 2011, 2012 | Lone Star Series, between the two largest metro areas in Texas, Dallas–Fort Worth and Houston, respectively. |
| 11 | Minnesota Twins | Milwaukee Brewers | 2002, 2003, 2004, 2005, 2006, 2007, 2008, 2009, 2010, 2011, 2012 | Border Battle, representing Minnesota (based in Minneapolis–Saint Paul) and Wisconsin (based in Milwaukee). The teams have overlapping territory around their shared border. |
| 8 | Kansas City Royals | St. Louis Cardinals | 2002, 2003, 2006, 2007, 2008, 2009, 2011, 2012 | I-70 Series/Show Me Series, representing the two largest cities of Missouri. |
| 8 | Toronto Blue Jays | Montreal Expos/Washington Nationals | 1998, 1999, 2000, 2001, 2002, 2003, 2004, 2005 | Pearson Cup (Expos moved to Washington prior to the 2005 season). Only all-Canadian series. |
| 7 | Baltimore Orioles | Washington Nationals | 2006, 2007, 2008, 2009, 2010, 2011, 2012 | Beltway Series, the two teams are from neighboring cities but share their market. |
| 6 | Boston Red Sox | Atlanta Braves | 1999, 2000, 2001, 2002, 2007, 2009 | Braves franchise originally located in Boston through 1952. |
| 3 | Baltimore Orioles | Philadelphia Phillies | 1999, 2000, 2001 | Both teams' markets overlap in Delaware and South Central Pennsylvania. |
| 3 | Boston Red Sox | Philadelphia Phillies | 1998, 2006, 2010 | |
| 3 | Texas Rangers | Arizona Diamondbacks | 1998, 1999, 2000 | Both teams' markets overlap in Eastern New Mexico. |
| 2 | Baltimore Orioles | New York Mets | 1998, 2002 | |
| 2 | New York Yankees | Atlanta Braves | 1998, 2012 | |
| 1 | Baltimore Orioles | Arizona Diamondbacks | 2007 | |
| 1 | Boston Red Sox | Miami Marlins | 2012 | |
| 1 | Detroit Tigers | Arizona Diamondbacks | 2005 | |
| 1 | Detroit Tigers | Colorado Rockies | 2003 | |
| 1 | Detroit Tigers | Pittsburgh Pirates | 2012 | |
| 1 | Detroit Tigers | St. Louis Cardinals | 1999 | |
| 1 | Kansas City Royals | Pittsburgh Pirates | 2000 | |
| 1 | Toronto Blue Jays | Los Angeles Dodgers | 2007 | |
| 1 | Toronto Blue Jays | Philadelphia Phillies | 2009 | |

From the onset of interleague play in 1997 through 2000, play was restricted to corresponding divisions (ex. AL East division vs NL East). 2001 saw the relaxing of this restriction, and 2002 saw the first season in which non-corresponding divisions played. From 2004 through 2019 saw a consistent cycle where divisions from opposing leagues would play each other every three years. Due to the effects of the COVID-19 pandemic), the 2020, 2021, and 2022 seasons would break the pattern of this cycle. 2023 would see the first season that every team played every other team, regardless of league. Divisional pairings before 2023 were:

| Season | NL East vs. | NL Central vs. | NL West vs. | AL East vs. | AL Central vs. | AL West vs. |
|---|---|---|---|---|---|---|
| 1997, 1998, 1999, 2000, 2001, 2006, 2009, 2012, 2015, 2018, 2020, 2021 | AL East | AL Central | AL West | NL East | NL Central | NL West |
| 2002, 2004, 2007, 2010, 2013, 2016, 2019 | AL Central | AL West | AL East | NL West | NL East | NL Central |
| 2003, 2005, 2008, 2011, 2014, 2017, 2022 | AL West | AL East | AL Central | NL Central | NL West | NL East |

==== 9/11 rescheduling ====
The 2001 season was suspended for one week due to the September 11 terrorist attacks and resulting disruptions in travel, resulting in games scheduled for September 11–16 being rescheduled to the first week of October and the playoffs and World Series being rescheduled one week later than their originally planned dates. This resulted in the World Series continuing into early November for the first time.

=== 2013–2017 ===
Schedule changes for 2013, precipitated by realignment that created two equal-sized leagues of 15 teams each, gave every team 20 interleague games. Sixteen of which were determined by a match of divisions, one from each league; all teams in a given division play all teams in a given division from the other league. (Each plays a three-game series against four teams from the designated division and two two-game series against the remaining team.) With this change, interleague games were now scattered throughout the season.

Each team played its four other interleague games against a designated "natural rival", with two games in each club's city. 20 of 30 teams had a permanent "natural rival", while 10 other teams would be a part of "split rivalries", where their natural rival would rotate either every year (in the case of the East divisions) or on an inconsistent basis.

In 2013 the natural rivalry games were all scheduled for May 27 to May 30 (Memorial Day weekend) but in 2014 their scheduled dates range from May to August. From 2015 on, there were no restrictions in when natural rivals would play.

Ten of the natural rivalries from 2012 and earlier continued, while the Houston–Texas "Lone Star" rivalry had been transformed into an intra-division one with 19 games played. The following were the permanent natural rivals:

- Baltimore Orioles v. Washington Nationals
- New York Mets (Queens) v. New York Yankees (Bronx)
- Miami Marlins v. Tampa Bay Rays (Tampa/St. Petersburg)
- Chicago Cubs (North Side) v. Chicago White Sox (South Side)
- Cincinnati Reds v. Cleveland Indians/Guardians
- Detroit Tigers v. Pittsburgh Pirates ‡
- Kansas City Royals v. St. Louis Cardinals
- Milwaukee Brewers v. Minnesota Twins (Minneapolis/St. Paul)
- Los Angeles Angels (of Anaheim) v. Los Angeles Dodgers
- Oakland Athletics v. San Francisco Giants

From 2013 through 2022, the split rivalry pairings would go as follows:

In the East:

- 2013, 2015, 2017, 2019, and 2021:
  - Boston Red Sox v. Philadelphia Phillies
  - Toronto Blue Jays v. Atlanta Braves
- 2014, 2016, 2018, 2020, and 2022 (these pairings would later be used from 2023 onward after the scheduling format change):
  - Boston Red Sox v. Atlanta Braves (from the American League inception in 1901 until 1952, both teams were based in Fenway–Kenmore)
  - Toronto Blue Jays v. Philadelphia Phillies

In the West:

- 2013 and 2019 (these pairings would later be used from 2023 onward after the scheduling format change):
  - Houston Astros v. Colorado Rockies
  - Seattle Mariners v. San Diego Padres
  - Texas Rangers v. Arizona Diamondbacks
- 2014, 2016, 2020, and 2022:
  - Houston Astros v. Arizona Diamondbacks
  - Seattle Mariners v. San Diego Padres
  - Texas Rangers v. Colorado Rockies
- 2015, 2017, and 2018:
  - Houston Astros v. Arizona Diamondbacks
  - Seattle Mariners v. Colorado Rockies
  - Texas Rangers v. San Diego Padres
- 2021:
  - Houston Astros v. San Diego Padres
  - Seattle Mariners v. Arizona Diamondbacks
  - Texas Rangers v. Colorado Rockies

Every team would play 19 games against each of 4 opponents within its division (76 games), as well as 6 games each against 4 opponents and 7 games against each of the other 6 opponents from other divisions within its own league (66 games).

When corresponding divisions (i.e. NL East vs. AL East) played each other, a slight adjustment was made to the interleague games. Teams would play 6 games against their rival and 4 games (home and home) against two opponents plus one home and one away 3-game series (20 total) against the other two teams in the opposing division. This was done in 2015, 2018, and 2021.

=== 2018–2019 ===
Under the collective bargaining agreement reached in December 2016, several changes were made to the scheduling pattern for the 2018 season. The overall length of the season was extended to 187 days with the addition of four off-days for all teams. All teams were scheduled to play on Opening Day, which for 2018 was March 29. Sunday Night Baseball will no longer be played on the final Sunday before the All-Star Game, in order to ease travel time for those who are participating in the Home Run Derby. A single, nationally televised night game will be played the following Thursday, with all other teams returning to play on Friday.

=== 2020 ===
Due to the 2020 COVID-19 pandemic the start of the season was delayed until July 23. Each team would only play 60 games this season and every game will be against the teams in their division and teams in the corresponding division of the other league.

In the shortened 2020 season, the Central divisions' usual rivalry matchups were altered. The Pittsburgh Pirates played six games against the Cleveland Indians and the Cincinnati Reds played six games against the Detroit Tigers instead of facing off in their usual rivalries, though the Pirates and Tigers still played a 3-game set and the Reds and Indians played a 4-game set. This was done to reduce travel in the wake of the COVID-19 pandemic.

=== 2023 ===
Under the collective bargaining agreement reached in March 2022, every team plays every other team regardless of league under the new balanced schedule. A team plays 13 games against each of the 4 opponents within its division (52 games), as well as 6 games each against 6 of the other 10 opponents within its own league and 7 games each against 4 of the other 10 opponents within its own league (64 games). Interleague play consisted of a four-game home and away series against the geographic rival and a single three-game series against the other 14 interleague opponents (46 games), with location to rotate every year.

=== 2025–2026 ===
Starting in 2025, yearly matchups against interleague rivals were expanded from four games to six, with two sets of matchups against intraleague opponents being reduced from seven games to six to accommodate.

Additionally, a new "MLB Rivalry Weekend" was revealed, with the inaugural edition taking place in the third weekend in May featuring all 30 teams playing a designated rival. Most of the rivalries were carried over from the 2023 and 2024 set of "natural rivalries", with the exception of four (‡).

- Atlanta Braves v. Boston Red Sox
- Baltimore Orioles v. Washington Nationals (Beltway Series)
- New York Mets v. New York Yankees (Subway Series)
- Miami Marlins v. Tampa Bay Rays (Citrus Series)
- Detroit Tigers v. Toronto Blue Jays ‡
- Philadelphia Phillies v. Pittsburgh Pirates (Phillies–Pirates rivalry) ‡
- Chicago Cubs v. Chicago White Sox (Crosstown Series)
- Cincinnati Reds v. Cleveland Guardians (Ohio Cup)
- Kansas City Royals v. St. Louis Cardinals (I-70 Series)
- Milwaukee Brewers v. Minnesota Twins (Border Battle)
- Athletics v. San Francisco Giants (Bay Bridge Series)
- Arizona Diamondbacks v. Colorado Rockies ‡
- Houston Astros v. Texas Rangers (Lone Star Series) ‡
- Los Angeles Angels v. Los Angeles Dodgers (Freeway Series)
- San Diego Padres v. Seattle Mariners (Vedder Cup)

== Time of first pitch ==
Start of Major League Baseball games depends on days of the week, game number in series, holidays, and other factors. As of 2021, most games start at 6:30 p.m., 7 p.m., or 7:30 p.m. in the local time zone, so there are more night games than day games even though baseball is traditionally played during the day. The reason why there are more night baseball games is to attract more fans to ballparks as well as viewers from home because most fans would be at work or school during the day. On Mondays (excluding Opening Day and holidays), Tuesdays, and Fridays, games are almost exclusively played at night except for Cubs home games. The last game of the series before departing for another series in another city the next day, are often day games, mainly Sundays, Wednesdays, and Thursdays, with more day games on the Pacific time zone, especially with teams in the Eastern or Central time zone. On Sundays, usually all but one are day games, with the final game reserved for NBC's Sunday Night Baseball. As of 2022, most Sunday afternoon games start at 1 p.m. or 1:30 p.m. in the local time zone.

About half of Saturday games are day games (1, 2 or 4 p.m. ET). In some markets, Saturday night games start an hour earlier than usual night start times, but other cities start Saturday night games at the same time as weeknight games. In conclusion, weekday games are only played at night except for final games of series while many weekend games are played during the day.

First pitch typically occurs between 5 and 10 minutes past the hour, in order to allow time for pre-game ceremonies.

Since 2021, MLB has implemented NFL-style flexible scheduling procedures for the final four weeks of each season for NBC/Peacock Sunday night and Fox Thursday or Saturday games on national television. Networks release their schedules without September games listed so to ensure games with playoff implications are broadcast on national television.

Washington Nationals home games played on the Fourth of July and Boston Red Sox home games played on the local Patriots' Day holiday start at 11 a.m. in order to coincide with the events of the two cities that are scheduled to take place on the two respective days. These games, and starting in 2022, MLB Sunday Leadoff games are usually the only games to start before noon local time during the season. (Sunday Leadoff games are only in Eastern time zone, with the Central time zone being added in 2023.)

Since 2015, the 162nd game of the regular season is usually scheduled on the final Sunday of September or first Sunday of October, and each game always starts at 3 p.m. ET regardless of time zone. MLB hoped that this would add excitement and drama during the final day, and also limit teams' ability to rest starters at the last minute based on early game results.
