= Beltway Series =

Major League Baseball rivalry in Baltimore-Washington, D.C., area

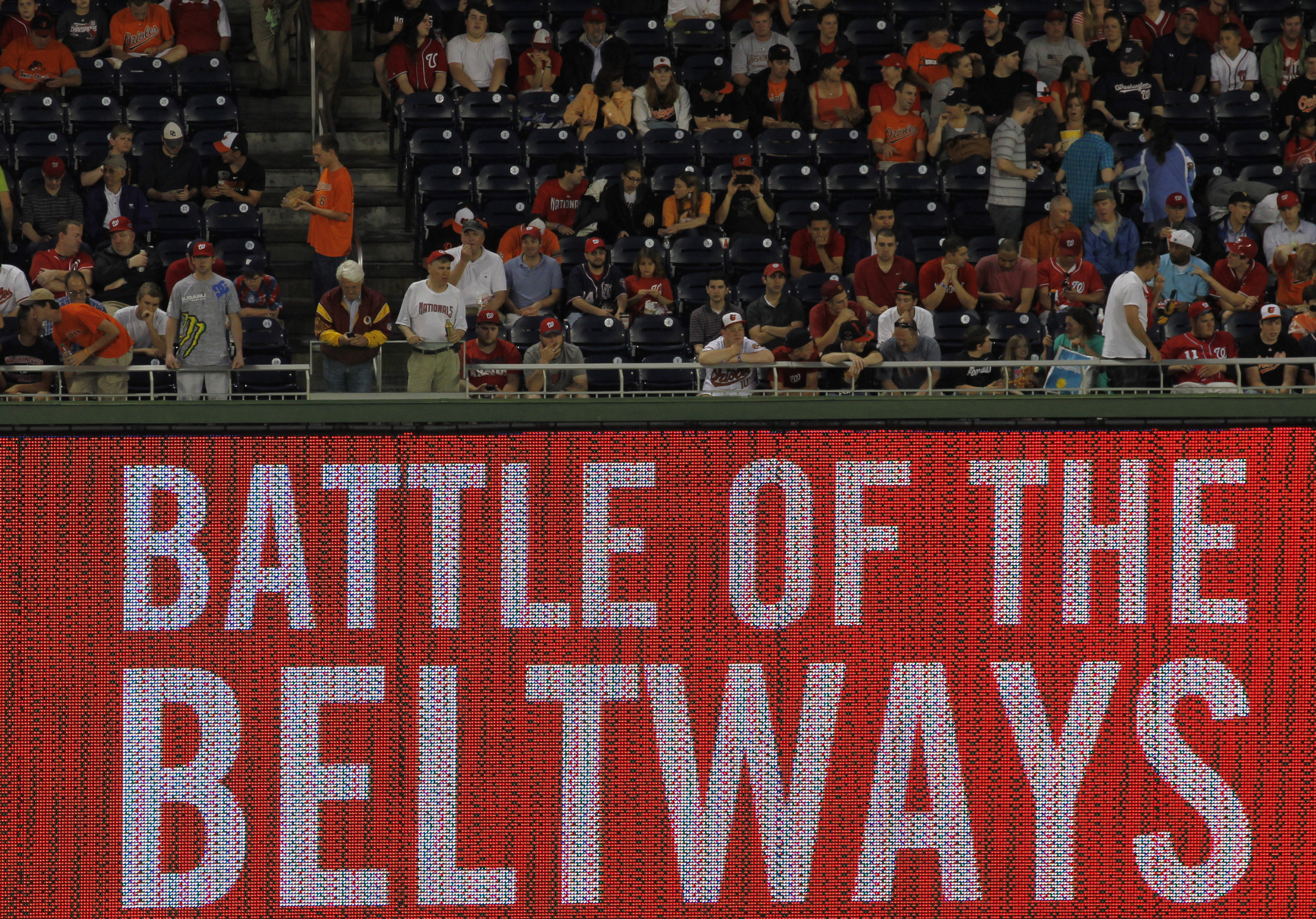
- Beltway Series at Nationals Park in 2013
- Location: Mid-Atlantic United States
- Teams: Baltimore Orioles; Washington Nationals
- First meeting: June 16, 1997; Oriole Park at Camden Yards, Baltimore, Maryland; Expos 6, Orioles 4
- Latest meeting: June 28, 2026; Oriole Park at Camden Yards, Baltimore, Maryland; Nationals 6, Orioles 4
- Next meeting: May 25, 2027; Nationals Park
- Stadiums: Orioles: Oriole Park at Camden Yards; Nationals: Nationals Park

Statistics
- Total meetings: 125
- Most wins: Orioles
- Regular season series: Orioles, 66–59 (.528)
- Largest victory: Orioles, 11–0 (August 7, 2020); Nationals, 17–5 (May 20, 2011); 15–3 (August 14, 2020)
- Longest win streak: Orioles, 7 (June 22, 2022–September 27, 2023); Nationals, 6 (May 10, 2017–June 19, 2018)
- Current win streak: Nationals, 2

Locations of the Baltimore Orioles and Washington Nationals

The Beltway Series, promoted by the teams as "The Battle of the Beltways," is the Major League Baseball (MLB) interleague rivalry series played between the Baltimore Orioles and Washington Nationals. The Orioles are a member of the American League (AL) East division, and the Nationals are a member of the National League (NL) East division. The series name is taken from the beltway highways, the Baltimore Beltway (I-695) and the Capital Beltway (I-495), that serve Baltimore, Maryland, and Washington, D.C., respectively.

Unusually for a sports rivalry, it arises more from circumstances surrounding the history of baseball in the two cities, about 40 miles (64 km) apart yet considered different markets, than anything that has so far happened on the field between the teams. Washington's previous team, the Senators, had been AL regulars for most of the 20th century, but after their 1933 pennant often finished last or almost last in the standings. Within a decade of the AL St. Louis Browns' move to Baltimore to become the Orioles in the 1950s, the Orioles became pennant contenders while the Senators moved to Minnesota and became the Twins. A replacement Senators franchise fared little better either commercially or athletically, moving to Arlington, Texas and becoming the Texas Rangers within another decade. Following that move, Orioles' owner Peter Angelos strongly opposed any attempt by Major League Baseball (MLB) to expand to Washington despite that city's larger market, arguing that both teams would suffer commercially and that the Orioles' protected market had legally expanded to Washington once the second Senators franchise moved.

After the former Montreal Expos moved to Washington for the 2005 season, the Nationals and the Orioles began a contentious business relationship over the Mid-Atlantic Sports Network (MASN) cable channel that carries telecasts of both teams' games, the only such arrangement in MLB. The Orioles own the majority stake, with the Nationals beginning in 2005 as a 10% partner and their stake increasing one percent per year for 23 years until reaching a cap of 33 percent. In the early 2010s the Nationals claimed that they were not getting their full share of MASN revenue; MLB's arbitration panel agreed with them but the Orioles, rather than accept that result, took it to court instead.

== History of the series ==
When interleague play began in 1997, MLB identified the Philadelphia Phillies as Baltimore's interleague "natural rival," and the Orioles began an annual interleague series against the Phillies that season. At the time, the franchise that would become the Washington Nationals played in Montreal as the Montreal Expos, and the Expos played the Toronto Blue Jays as their interleague "natural rival" each year from 1997 to 2004 in what became known as the All-Canadian Series. The Orioles and Expos met one another in routine interleague play – without any connotation of a "rivalry" or other special association between the teams – during the 1997, 1998, 1999, 2000, and 2001 seasons. The Expos posted a 9–6 record against the Orioles.

The relocation of the Expos to Washington for the 2005 season marked the first time the Baltimore–Washington Metropolitan Area had two Major League Baseball franchises since the 1971 season, after which the second Washington Senators franchise had moved to Arlington, Texas, to become the Texas Rangers. MLB changed the Orioles′ "natural rival" to the Nationals, but the Expos move to Washington came after the 2005 schedule already had been set. Thus, Baltimore and Washington did not face one another at all in 2005; the Orioles instead played the Phillies as their "natural rival" for the last time, while the Nationals played what would have been the Expos′ 2005 schedule, including six games against the Blue Jays that would have constituted the 2005 All-Canadian Series had the Expos remained in Montreal. The 2006 schedule thus became the first to include games between Baltimore and Washington as interleague "natural rivals," inaugurating the "Beltway Series."

=== Scheduling ===
From 2006 through 2012, the teams played each other six times a year, with one three-game series in each city and the two series taking place in May and June. The two series were separated by between three and six weeks.

From 2013 — when a realignment took effect in Major League Baseball's two leagues and their divisions — through 2022, the schedule varied according to whether the American League East and National League East were scheduled to play one another in interleague play, which occurred on a rotational basis once every three years. During these seasons, the Beltway Series consisted of six games, with one three-game series in each city, played at any point during the season; in 2015, for example, the teams played in Baltimore in July and in Washington in September. In seasons in which the two divisions did not meet, the Orioles and Nationals played four games, with a two-game series in each city. From 2013 to 2017, the four games were played consecutively, but from 2019 onward, the four games were played in two two-game series that could take place at any point during the season.

In 2023, the MLB schedule changed so that all MLB teams play each other each season. Under this new scheduling system, the Orioles and Nationals played each other four times in 2023 and 2024, each hosting a two-game series. In 2025, the series expanded to six games, with each team hosting a three-game series.

=== Overall results ===
Through 2025, the Orioles lead the Beltway Series in season series wins, 10–3–7, as well as overall wins 58–46.

== Controversy fueling the rivalry ==
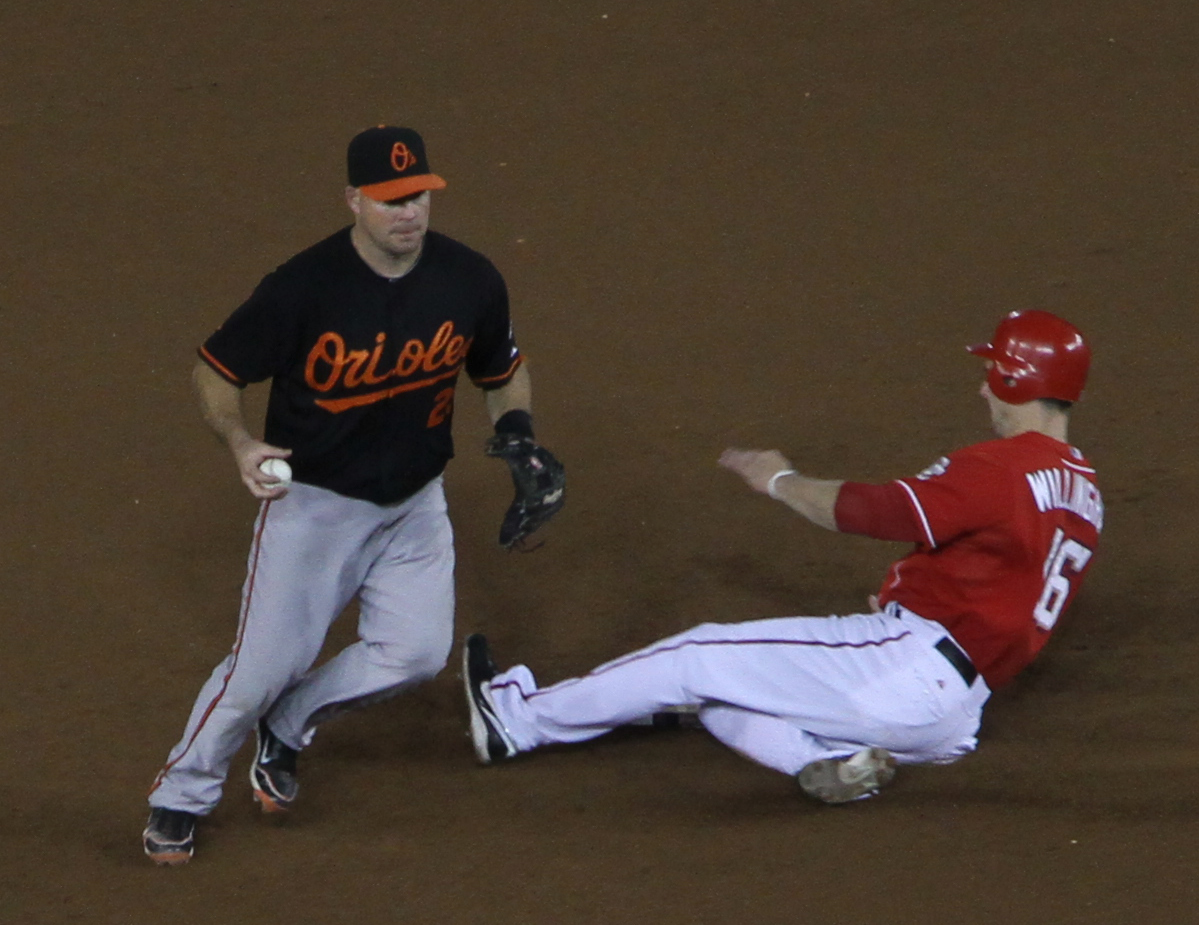
A play at second base during a 2010 Beltway Series game at Nationals Park

Controversy that fuels the Beltway Series rivalry revolves around various factors related to the unusual way in which the Washington, D.C. baseball market developed between the departure of the second Washington Senators team after the 1971 season and the arrival of the Nationals for the 2005 season because of the Orioles′ deep penetration of the Washington market during the era, as well as the circumstances under which the Expos relocated to Washington and the television deal MLB struck with the Orioles for coverage of Nationals games.

=== History of play between the cities ===
Both cities have a long history of professional baseball, beginning with the 1871 Washington Olympics and the 1882 American Association Baltimore Orioles, followed by the 1886 Washington Nationals of the National League, which folded soon after the 1889 season. The first major-league games between the two cities took place in 1891, when the first Washington Senators (originally the Statesmen) began play in the American Association. The following season saw both teams join the National League. The two teams played 122 games, with the Orioles winning 79 to the Senators' 41, tying twice. The Baltimore and Washington National League teams both folded the 1899 season.

Upon the formation of the American League in 1901, franchises began play in both cities, with the original Washington Senators and a Baltimore Orioles team among the eight charter members. The Senators and Orioles played 40 times in those first two seasons, with the Orioles winning 22 to the Senators' 17, tying once. The original American League Orioles folded in 1902, and its remains became the foundation of the New York Highlanders, which began play in 1903 and eventually became the New York Yankees.

Play between Baltimore and Washington resumed in 1954 when the St. Louis Browns relocated to Baltimore and became the current Orioles, once again giving both cities teams in the American League and regular meetings each season. This second period of play between Baltimore and Washington lasted through the 1971 season. The original Senators moved to Minnesota after the 1960 season and became the Minnesota Twins and were replaced by a second Senators franchise, and expansion team which played in Washington from 1961 through the 1971 season. After the 1971 season, the second Senators franchise moved to Texas and became the Texas Rangers. The Orioles played 350 games combined against the two Senators franchises. Overall, the Orioles won the series with the Senators 224–126, which included an 89–65 mark against the original Senators and a 135–61 record against the second Senators franchise.

After the departure of the second Senators franchise, various efforts to return MLB to the Washington, D.C., area occurred, including a 1973 effort that almost relocated the San Diego Padres to Washington for the 1974 season, bids to purchase the Orioles in 1975 and the San Francisco Giants in 1976 and move them, a large "Baseball in Washington in ′87" promotion in 1987 advocating that a team to come to Washington, calls in 1991 and 1994 for MLB to place an expansion team in Washington, and efforts to buy the Pittsburgh Pirates in 1995 and the Houston Astros in 1996 for a move to Washington. None of these efforts bore fruit, and Washington, D.C., had no Major League Baseball team from 1972 through 2004. Play between Baltimore and Washington did not resume until the advent of the Beltway Series in 2006.

=== Opposition to relocation by the Orioles ===
The Nationals–Orioles rivalry is influenced by circumstances surrounding the Nationals' founding. Peter Angelos, the owner of the Orioles, opposed the move of the Montreal Expos to Washington on the grounds that it would harm the Orioles financially, contending that the Orioles would lose fans to a Washington baseball team and that the Orioles alone had had a legal right to the entire Baltimore-Washington market since the departure of the second Senators team at the end of the 1971 season; in fact, the Orioles changed the team name on their away jerseys from "Baltimore" to "Orioles" in 1972 in an attempt to convince D.C. fans to adopt the Orioles as their "home" team. Ultimately, the owners of the other MLB teams approved the move to Washington in a 28–1 vote on December 3, 2004; Angelos cast the sole dissenting vote. The Orioles′ opposition to a baseball team in Washington created negative feelings among some Nationals fans toward the Orioles franchise, while some Orioles fans viewed the relocation of the Expos to Washington as an unwelcome intrusion that harmed the Orioles′ fan support and revenue. Even though the Nationals began play in 2005, the Orioles did not change the team name on their away jerseys back to "Baltimore" until 2009.

In the first four full seasons after baseball returned to Washington, the Nationals drew 9,127,252 fans to their games, compared to 8,892,951 fans attending Orioles games. The Nationals were a larger draw in 2005, while both teams were about the same in 2006 (the Orioles drew exactly 100 more fans that year), and in 2007 the Orioles were a larger draw by nearly 200,000 fans. In 2008 the momentum swung back the Nationals' way, with the Nationals outdrawing the Orioles by over 370,000 fans, due in part to the opening of Nationals Park. In 2009, the Orioles again drew better, attracting almost 90,000 more fans than the Nationals, but from 2010 through 2017 the Nationals outdrew the Orioles annually, ranging from an advantage of over 95,000 fans in 2010 to one of over 496,000 fans in 2017, and during the eight seasons from 2010 through 2017 combined the Nationals drew over 2,200,000 more fans than the Orioles. In 2018, as the Orioles struggled through a historically bad season, the Nationals outdrew the Orioles by over 965,000 fans.

=== "There are no real baseball fans in D.C." ===
During a 2004 radio interview on WBAL in Baltimore a few months before MLB approved the relocation of the Expos in which he voiced his opposition to a team in Washington, Angelos declared that "there are no real baseball fans in D.C." The comment has fueled resentment among some Washington baseball fans ever since, given their support for the Orioles before the Nationals began play in Washington and their enthusiasm for the Nationals since their arrival. The Washington sports media regularly cite Angelos's comment when discussing subjects such as the Nationals' success in drawing fans to games in Washington, attendance figures in Washington relative to those in Baltimore, and the number of Nationals fans who journey north to Baltimore for Beltway Series games between the teams.

=== Television issues ===
The dispute with Angelos over the Expos′ move to Washington to become the Nationals was resolved when the Orioles were granted the right to broadcast Nationals games as well as Orioles games on their new regional sports television network, the Mid-Atlantic Sports Network (MASN), which is headquartered in Baltimore. The ramifications of the way in which Major League Baseball and Angelos created the new network and the agreements behind its creation has led to ill feeling among some fans.

In order to overcome Angelos′ opposition to the Expos′ move to Washington to become the Nationals and to head off any potential litigation over the matter, Major League Baseball (which owned the Expos/Nationals franchise from 2002 to 2006) and Angelos struck a deal in 2005 to create MASN. The deal gave the Orioles an initial 90 percent ownership stake in the new network, while the Nationals owned 10 percent. The agreement gave the Nationals an automatic increase in their ownership stake of one percent per year for 23 years, after which their share of the ownership would reach 33 percent and the annual increases would stop. Thereafter, the Orioles would own 67 percent of the network and the Nationals 33 percent of it in perpetuity. The Orioles also agreed to pay the Nationals $20 million per year through the 2011 season for the rights to televise Nationals games regardless of the actual fair market value of those rights, considered a good deal for the Nationals at the time because their fan base had not yet developed, their television coverage was sometimes spotty, and their likely lack of success on the field in their first few seasons would suppress their television viewership. The agreement required the Orioles and Nationals to renegotiate the annual amount the Orioles paid to broadcast National games for the 2012 through 2016 seasons, and then again for each five-season period after that. The agreement has left the Nationals as the only Major League Baseball team that does not own its own regional sports network.

==== Broadcast practices ====
Major League Baseball and Angelos struck the deal to create MASN only days before the beginning of the 2005 season, before the completion of arrangements for Washington-area cable television providers to carry MASN's two channels (MASN and MASN2). As a result of this, many D.C.-area fans initially did not receive the new network via their cable television providers and were unable to watch most Nationals games for some time during the Nationals′ first season, leading to frustration with the network among Nationals fans. Furthermore, some Nationals fans contend that the majority ownership stake that Angelos and the Orioles hold in MASN leads the network to exhibit a bias in covering the Orioles compared to the Nationals, such as displaying the scores of Beltway Series games as "Orioles vs. Washington" – which critics see as sending a subtle message that the Orioles represent the entire Baltimore-Washington area, while the Nationals represent only Washington – as opposed to a more neutral "Orioles vs. Nationals" or "Baltimore vs. Washington."

==== 2008–2013 mixed-booth broadcasts ====
The Mid-Atlantic Sports Network (MASN), which owns the rights to broadcast both Orioles and Nationals games, televised the 2006 and 2007 Beltway Series in a conventional format, with each team's broadcasters covering the game for separate audiences via separate telecasts. From 2008 through 2013, however, MASN televised the Beltway Series using an unconventional concept in which mixed Orioles-Nationals broadcast booths covered each game. In the mixed-booth concept, the two teams′ play-by-play announcers – Jim Hunter for the Orioles and Bob Carpenter for the Nationals – alternated on play-by-play during each game and color analysts and sideline reporters from both teams worked together in the booth and on the field throughout each game. The concept was based on the premise that the Orioles and Nationals were both "home" teams for the combined Baltimore-Washington area, and that fans in both cities followed and supported both teams, were familiar with both sets of broadcasters, and would enjoy coverage of Beltway Series games by broadcasters from both of "their" teams working together in the same telecast. In 2010 news releases about that year's Beltway Series, MASN referred to its "popular mixed booth broadcast," and on May 29, 2013, Hunter started a Beltway Series broadcast from Oriole Park by saying "It′s your Nats, it's your Orioles, going head-to-head on your network." With the mixed booth in use, each Beltway Series game was simulcast on both MASN cable channels (MASN and MASN2).

By 2013, fan feedback suggested that the unusual mixed-booth arrangement was overwhelmingly unpopular with both Orioles and Nationals fans, and in February 2014 MASN announced an end to it. In a February 26, 2014, statement announcing the change, MASN said, "The combined booth is an idea that's run its course, and with both teams possessing strong individual identities and playoff aspirations for 2014 the decision was made to give fans what they've been clamoring for – their individual team's broadcast partners calling the action as they would for any other game." Since 2014, MASN's Orioles and Nationals broadcast teams have covered each Beltway Series game separately, with the home team's broadcast televised on MASN and the visiting team's broadcast on MASN2.

==== Broadcast rights fees ====
When the amount MASN pays annually to the Nationals to broadcast Nationals games first came up for renegotiation in 2012, another source of discontent arose between some Orioles and Nationals fans. The Nationals asked for MASN to increase its annual payment from $20 million to $118 million per year for the 2012 through 2016 seasons, while the Orioles countered with an offer averaging $39.5 million per year, and MASN began paying the Nationals that amount in 2012 pending agreement between MASN and the Nationals on a fee. When MASN and the Nationals could not agree on an annual amount, the Orioles and Nationals submitted the matter to Major League Baseball's Revenue-Sharing Definitions Committee for arbitration. The committee issued a written decision in 2014 that MASN should pay the Nationals an average of $59 million per year for 2012 through 2016. Claiming the decision was biased against the Orioles, MASN pursued litigation on behalf of the Orioles and itself to have the committee's decision vacated. With the matter tied up in the courts, the entire 2012-2016 period went by without a resolution of the matter, and the teams missed the next required renegotiation for the seasons from 2017 through 2021. Prevented by the MASN deal from selling their television rights on the open market, the Nationals sought payment from MASN of over $100 million in fees each for the 2012-2016 and 2017-2021 periods, and some Nationals fans resent the delay in MASN increasing the rights fees it pays their team because of the impact it has on the Nationals′ revenues and the Nationals′ ability to sign expensive free agents. The dispute also led to significant acrimony between the owners of the two teams, and the Lerner family, which purchased the Nationals from MLB in 2006, pointed to the MASN agreement as a complication in an effort they made to sell the Nationals, as the impossibility of valuing the rights and the lack of control over them drove down the team's market value and made it unattractive to potential buyers.

The 2024 sale of the Orioles to David Rubenstein finally resulted in a softening of relations, and just before the beginning of the 2025 season both teams and MLB announced that the litigation had been settled and the MASN agreement dissolved. MASN then signed a new one-year contract with the Nationals to broadcast their games in 2025, after which the Nationals are free to sell their broadcasts on the open market for the first time in their history in Washington. The team would then sign with Major League Baseball's in-house broadcasting unit MLB Local Media for the 2026 season.

=== 2015 Baltimore schedule ===
The Washington Post reported that the animosity between the teams over the television rights fee dispute may have played a role in the Orioles postponing two games of a three-game home series in 2015 against the Chicago White Sox, playing the third game without allowing fans to attend, and moving a subsequent series with the Tampa Bay Rays originally scheduled to be played in Baltimore to Tampa Bay due to security concerns during the civil unrest in Baltimore following the death of Freddie Gray in April 2015. The Nationals were in the middle of a long road trip at the time, so Nationals Park in Washington was available on short notice as a nearby venue that could have hosted Orioles games, and Commissioner of Baseball Rob Manfred had suggested that possibility earlier in the week. An Orioles spokesman would not comment on whether the teams' dispute affected Orioles′ rescheduling decisions, but another source with the team told The Washington Post that it had. The Nationals said that neither the Orioles nor MLB approached them about making Nationals Park available to the Orioles, and the Nationals never made the offer themselves.

=== "O!" ===
The tradition of yelling "O!" during the line "Oh say does that star-spangled banner yet wave" during the singing of the national anthem, "The Star-Spangled Banner," is a Baltimore Orioles tradition. Over the years that Washington had no baseball team and the Orioles penetrated the Washington market (1972–2004), it became a staple of Washington-area sporting events as well. Yelling "O!" during the national anthem has caused controversy when used at Washington sports events in the past, and the yelling of "O!" during the anthem at Nationals games, even when the Nationals were not hosting the Orioles, reignited such controversy because some Nationals fans resent importing Orioles traditions into Nationals baseball culture and some sports fans view the shouting of "O!" during the national anthem at any sporting event as disrespectful of the American flag. Other fans disagree, arguing that many fans never understood, have forgotten, or do not care about the connection of "O!" with the Orioles and that shouting "O!" during the anthem has become an established tradition that is valid at any sporting event anywhere in the Baltimore-Washington region and does not necessarily signify support for the Baltimore Orioles.

=== Angelos "kind enough to let them have a team here" ===
After a Beltway Series game in Washington on July 7, 2014, Nationals pitcher Stephen Strasburg lamented the high proportion of Orioles fans in the stands at Nationals Park. Speaking to the press before the next day's game between the clubs, Orioles manager Buck Showalter responded by saying, "You realize how big an area this [Washington] was for the Orioles before our owner [Peter Angelos] was kind enough to let them have a team here [in Washington]." For some Nationals fans and members of the Washington sports media, Showalter's comment rankled, as they felt that Angelos had exhibited no kindness at all toward baseball in Washington either before or during the Expos-Nationals relocation process or in terms of the MASN television deal he struck with MLB. Writing in The Washington Times, sports columnist Thom Loverro described Showalter's comment as a "foolish insult," and took the matter further, arguing that, from a historical perspective, the Orioles organization owed a great deal to the kindness of Washington baseball owners and fans, as the Orioles might never have existed if the owners of the original Washington Senators franchise, the family of Clark Griffith, had not agreed to allow the St. Louis Browns to relocate for the 1954 season to Baltimore, which was considered the Senators′ territory at the time. Loverro added that as owner of the Orioles, Washington lawyer Edward Bennett Williams had not moved the Orioles to Washington, as many had expected after he bought the Orioles in 1979, had done much to encourage Washingtonians to support the Orioles, and had been instrumental in securing approval of the construction of Oriole Park at Camden Yards, and that the Orioles had enjoyed much of their financial success over the years because of the support of fans from Washington. The Baltimore press reported Showalter's comment differently; for example, Alejandro Zuniga wrote in The Baltimore Sun that the MASN deal had made up to Angelos and the Orioles for their loss of business when the Expos relocated into the Orioles′ territory, and that the MASN deal had not prevented "plenty of Orioles fans from converting into supporters of their new, more local ballclub [i.e., the Nationals]."

=== 2017 rainout ===
With Baltimore leading the series two games to one, the final game of the 2017 Beltway Series was scheduled for May 11 at Nationals Park, but it rained for much of the day and the Nationals postponed the game based on a prediction that rain would continue well into the evening. The game was rescheduled for June 8. In pregame comments to the media on June 8, Orioles manager Buck Showalter noted that the sun had been shining by the time the Orioles' team bus left Nationals Park on May 11 and that the game could have been played. The Orioles, he added, would have played with a healthy lineup that evening that included center fielder Adam Jones and third baseman Manny Machado; Dylan Bundy, the Orioles′ best starter, would have been on the mound. In contrast, the Nationals had planned for A. J. Cole, who had had only mixed success at the major-league level over the preceding three years, to make a spot start on May 11. By June 8, Jones and Machado both were injured, and Bundy was not the scheduled starter. Sports reporters took away a clear impression that the Orioles believed that the Nationals had unnecessarily cancelled the game so as to avoid an unfavorable pitching matchup and facing the Orioles′ best lineup. The Nationals won the June 8 game to clinch a 2–2 Beltway Series tie for the season.

Asked about the Orioles′ interpretation of the postponement, Nationals General Manager Mike Rizzo responded that the weather forecast for May 11 had called — incorrectly, as it turned out — for rain to persist well into the evening and that Showalter had been in full agreement on May 11 that the game should be postponed. Rizzo added that the Orioles had refused to play on the teams′ next mutual off date, May 15 (which would have forced the Orioles to go 27 straight days without a full day off, which is more than the maximum of 20 allowed by the Collective Bargaining Agreement), necessitating that they play on June 8, and that the June 8 date actually was less favorable to the Nationals, who gave up an off-day after a 10-day, three-city trip to the United States West Coast, than to the Orioles, who were just completing a nine-game homestand in nearby Baltimore. Given all of this, Rizzo said that the Orioles should "quit whining."

=== No trades until 2026 ===
Beginning with the Expos' move to DC in 2005, the two teams did not agree to a trade until 2026. Barry Svrluga of The Washington Post wrote in 2019 that: "The groups that own the two teams have a deep and abiding loathing for each other. Oh, and they have been embroiled in a legal case regarding tens of millions of dollars from their shared regional sports network.". With the Orioles under new ownership beginning in 2024 and the MASN dispute finally resolved in 2025, the teams agreed to their first trade on July 1, 2026. The exchange of minor-leaguers sent pitcher Kyle Nicolas and infielder Randal Diaz to the Nationals and Orioles respectively.

== Questioning the rivalry ==
The idea that a rivalry exists between the Nationals and Orioles is itself controversial. Despite the marketing of the Beltway Series as a "Battle of the Beltways" and the animosity some Baltimore and Washington baseball fans feel toward one another's teams and cities, some observers – both sports journalists and fans – question whether a Nationals-Orioles rivalry truly exists, arguing that it is a "manufactured" rivalry born of the media, marketing, interleague play, and coincidental geographical proximity rather than history or the significance of the games, and that the Beltway Series lacks the meaning of true rivalries found elsewhere in MLB.

=== Non-competitive history ===
Sports rivalries generally arise between teams that are familiar with one another, play one another frequently, and have a history of parity and of meeting one another in significant games, but this has rarely, if ever, occurred between Baltimore and Washington MLB teams. During the years from 1954 to 1971, when the Orioles played the original Senators and then the expansion Senators regularly in the American League, the Orioles enjoyed great success, while the two Senators teams between them managed only one winning season, in 1969. This unbalanced competition militated against any real rivalry springing up between the teams, as games between them tended to be insignificant and dominated by Baltimore. Moreover, memories of this era have faded with time as Baltimore- and Washington-area fans age and thanks to the transient nature of the Washington-area population, where the dominance of United States Government employment results in significant turnovers in population as people arrive to participate in government activities, then leave as political circumstances change.

During the early years of the Beltway Series from 2006 to 2011, neither the Nationals nor the Orioles fielded competitive teams, and this meant that the editions of the Beltway Series during those seasons carried no real importance in terms of either team's prospects for winning seasons. Since 2012, when both the Nationals and Orioles began to achieve real success, fan interest in both teams has increased and led to greater attendance, but no particularly significant game has arisen as part of the Beltway Series.

In 2017, the rivalry started to become more lopsided. The Nationals won the National League East with a 97–65 record but lost to the Chicago Cubs in the NLDS. The Orioles suffered their first losing season since 2011 by finishing 75–87, tied for last place in the American League East. In 2018, despite the Nationals finishing just 82–80, the Orioles finished the season with a disastrous 47–115 record, their first 100-loss season since 1988 and committing to a rebuild. In 2019, this rivalry became even more one-sided when the Nationals claimed a spot in the 2019 World Series against the Houston Astros, which they eventually won. Meanwhile, the Orioles who underwent a rebuild, finished the season with a seven-game improvement over 2018 with a 54–108 record.

In 2022, despite the Orioles finishing 83–79, the Nationals finished with their franchise-worst 55–107 record, just three years removed from being World Series champions. The rivalry became one-sided in favor of the Orioles after the Orioles finished their rebuild when they ended their losing-season streak at five (2017–2021).

In 2025, the rivalry turned heads in favor of the Nationals, despite both teams not fielding competitive teams. It was also the first time since 2018 that the Nationals would win a season series over the Orioles.

=== Two-team fans ===
The Baltimore and Washington sports markets also call into question the extent to which fans view a rivalry as existing. Although relatively few Baltimore-area baseball fans appear to support the Nationals, many Washington-area fans adopted the Orioles as their "home team" during the 33 seasons (1972–2004) Washington had no MLB team, and this penetration of the Washington sports market by the Orioles has resulted in many Washington-area MLB fans continuing to root for the Orioles, either instead of or in addition to the Nationals. Supporting both teams is made easier by their membership in different leagues and the rarity of their meetings compared to the number of games they play against divisional and league rivals. For fans who support both teams, the Baltimore-Washington metropolitan area constitutes a two-team market in which they root for one team in each league; to such fans, the Beltway Series is a matter of interest because it involves both of their "home" teams, rather than their home team playing against a disliked crosstown rival. The Beltway Series tends to draw well in both cities, but this does not necessarily indicate that fans are attending to watch a chapter in a true rivalry between teams with a history of meaningful competition or animosity; many appear to view the series merely as an annual opportunity for low-key, good-natured competition between the teams and their fans for "bragging rights" in the Baltimore-Washington region.

=== Players' attitudes ===
In a September 2015 game at Nationals Park, Nationals pitcher Jonathan Papelbon hit Orioles infielder Manny Machado with a pitch, resulting in an exchange of words between Machado and Papelbon, both dugouts emptying, and Papelbon's ejection from the game. Machado called Papelbon a "coward." Otherwise, no particular ill feeling has existed on the field between the teams. Players of both teams appear to view the teams in their own divisions — which they play 14 times each per season — as their rivals, and they attach no particular significance to the comparatively short annual Beltway Series, which merely pits them briefly against a team in a different league that they otherwise would not play unless they met in the World Series.

== Season-by-season results ==
Prior to the Expos moving to Washington, D.C., to become the Nationals in 2005 and the start of the Beltway Series in 2006, the Expos and Orioles met in a three-game series each season from 1997 to 2001.

Baltimore Orioles vs. Montreal Expos/Washington Nationals Season-by-Season Results
1990s (Expos, 5–4)

Season	Season series		at Baltimore Orioles	at Montreal Expos	Overall series	Notes
1997	Expos	2‍–‍1	Expos; 2‍–‍1	no games	Expos; 2‍–‍1	Interleague play was introduced in the 1997 season, marking the first time the Orioles and Expos played each other in the regular season. Orioles' win on June 17 snapped the Expos' 10–game winning streak.
1998	Expos	3‍–‍0	no games	Expos; 3‍–‍0	Expos; 5‍–‍1	First season series sweep for the Expos.
1999	Orioles	3‍–‍0	Orioles; 3‍–‍0	no games	Expos; 5‍–‍4	First season series sweep by Orioles.

2000s (Expos/Nationals, 16–14)

Season	Season series		at Baltimore Orioles	at Montreal Expos/Washington Nationals	Overall series	Notes
2000	Expos	3‍–‍0	no games	Expos; 3‍–‍0	Expos; 8‍–‍4	
2001	Orioles	2‍–‍1	Orioles; 2‍–‍1	no games	Expos; 9‍–‍6	Final matchups Expos played as a Montreal-based team.
2006	Tie	3‍–‍3	Orioles; 2‍–‍1	Nationals; 2‍–‍1	Nationals; 12‍–‍9	Expos relocate to Washington, D.C. last season and rename themselves to the Washington Nationals. First meetings of Baltimore and Washington MLB teams since the 1971 season First road win for Orioles against Expos/Nationals in franchise history
2007	Nationals	4‍–‍2	Nationals; 3‍–‍0	Orioles; 2‍–‍1	Nationals; 16‍–‍11	
2008	Tie	3‍–‍3	Orioles; 2‍–‍1	Nationals; 2‍–‍1	Nationals; 19‍–‍14	Nationals open Nationals Park.
2009	Orioles	4‍–‍2	Orioles; 2‍–‍1	Orioles; 2‍–‍1	Nationals; 21‍–‍18	On June 26 at Oriole Park at Camden Yards, Orioles beat the Nationals 11–1, their most runs scored in a game against the Nationals.

2010s (Orioles, 29–21)

Season	Season series		at Baltimore Orioles	at Washington Nationals	Overall series	Notes
2010	Orioles	4‍–‍2	Orioles; 3‍–‍0	Nationals; 2‍–‍1	Nationals; 23‍–‍22	
2011	Tie	3‍–‍3	Orioles; 2‍–‍1	Nationals; 2‍–‍1	Nationals; 26‍–‍25	On May 20 at Oriole Park at Camden Yards, Nationals beat the Orioles 17–5, their largest victory against the Orioles with a 12–point differential and their most runs scored in a game against the Orioles. Last time Nationals held the overall series record over the Orioles.
2012	Orioles	4‍–‍2	Orioles; 2‍–‍1	Orioles; 2‍–‍1	Orioles; 29‍–‍28	Orioles take the overall series record over the Nationals. Both teams make playoffs; first playoff appearance for the Nationals; first playoff appearance for the Orioles after a 14-season drought. Nationals finish with the best record in the league (98–64).
2013	Orioles	3‍–‍1	Orioles; 2‍–‍0	Tie; 1‍–‍1	Orioles; 32‍–‍29	Series changed to four-game format with two in each city except in years the AL East plays the NL East (2015, 2018, 2020, 2021)
2014	Orioles	3‍–‍1	Tie; 1‍–‍1	Orioles; 2‍–‍0	Orioles; 35‍–‍30	Both teams win their respective divisions and finish with the same record (96–66).
2015	Orioles	4‍–‍2	Nationals; 2‍–‍1	Orioles; 3‍–‍0	Orioles; 39‍–‍32	
2016	Orioles	3‍–‍1	Orioles; 2‍–‍0	Tie; 1‍–‍1	Orioles; 42‍–‍33	
2017	Tie	2‍–‍2	Orioles; 2‍–‍0	Nationals; 2‍–‍0	Orioles; 44‍–‍35	Home team wins all meetings for the first time.
2018	Nationals	5‍–‍1	Nationals; 3‍–‍0	Nationals; 2‍–‍1	Orioles; 45‍–‍40	Orioles finish season at 47–115 (.290), the worst record in Orioles history. Nationals first season series win since 2007.
2019	Tie	2‍–‍2	Tie; 1‍–‍1	Tie; 1‍–‍1	Orioles; 47‍–‍42	Nationals win 2019 World Series.

2020s (Orioles, 19‍–‍17)

Season	Season series		at Baltimore Orioles	at Washington Nationals	Overall series	Notes
2020	Orioles	4‍–‍2	Nationals; 2‍–‍1	Orioles; 3‍–‍0	Orioles; 51‍–‍44	2020 season reduced to 60 games amidst the COVID-19 pandemic. On August 7 at Nationals Park, Orioles beat the Nationals 11–0, tying for the most runs scored in a game against the Nationals and their largest victory against the Nationals with an 11–run differential. On August 14 at Oriole Park at Camden Yards, Nationals beat the Orioles 15–3, tying for their largest victory against the Orioles with a 12–run differential.
2021	Tie	3‍–‍3	Orioles; 3‍–‍0	Nationals; 3‍–‍0	Orioles; 54‍–‍47	Home team wins all six meetings. Nationals closer Brad Hand blows save in ninth inning to prevent Nationals from winning the season series in the sixth game.
2022	Orioles	3‍–‍1	Tie; 1‍–‍1	Orioles; 2‍–‍0	Orioles; 57‍–‍48	
2023	Orioles	4‍–‍0	Orioles; 2‍–‍0	Orioles; 2‍–‍0	Orioles; 61‍–‍48	First-ever season series sweep by either team in Beltway Series history. All MLB teams start playing each other in a season; Four-game series format used for interleague rivals. Orioles win 7 games in a row against the Nationals.
2024	Tie	2‍–‍2	Tie; 1‍–‍1	Tie; 1‍–‍1	Orioles; 63‍–‍50	
2025	Nationals	5‍–‍1	Nationals; 3‍–‍0	Nationals; 2‍–‍1	Orioles; 64‍–‍55	Series changes to a six-game format with three in each city every year.
2026	Nationals	4‍–‍2	Nationals; 2‍–‍1	Nationals; 2‍–‍1	Orioles; 66‍–‍59	For the first time in Beltway Series history, the Nationals win a season series over the Orioles in consecutive seasons.

Summary of Results

Season	Season series		at Baltimore Orioles	at Washington Nationals	Notes
Baltimore Orioles vs Montreal Expos	Expos	9‍–‍6	Orioles, 6‍–‍3	Expos, 6‍–‍0	
Baltimore Orioles vs Washington Nationals	Orioles	60‍–‍50	Orioles, 31‍–‍24	Orioles, 29‍–‍26	
Overall Regular season	Orioles	66‍–‍59	Orioles, 37‍–‍27	Nationals, 32‍–‍29	
Season series record	Season series		at Baltimore Orioles	at Washington Nationals	Notes
Baltimore Orioles vs Montreal Expos	Expos	3‍–‍2	N/A	N/A	
Baltimore Orioles vs Washington Nationals	Orioles	10‍–‍4‍–‍7	N/A	N/A	
Overall Regular season	Orioles	12‍–‍7‍–‍7	N/A	N/A	

== See also ==
- Major League Baseball rivalries
- Pearson Cup, the rivalry series played by the Montreal Expos before they moved after the 2004 season to become the Washington Nationals
