= Major League Baseball transactions =

Exchanges of players between MLB teams

Major League Baseball transactions are changes made to the roster of a Major League Baseball team during or after the season. They may include waiving, releasing, and trading players, as well as assigning players to minor league teams.

== Active, expanded, and postseason rosters ==
As of the 2025 season, each team maintains a 26-man active roster, a 28-man expanded roster, and a 40-man reserve list of players. Players on the 26-man roster are eligible to play in official major league games throughout the season. The 40-man reserve list includes the players on the 26-man roster plus as many as 14 players who are either on the team's seven-, ten-, fifteen-, or 60-day injured list, who are on paternity leave for up to three days, or who are in the franchise's farm teams in Minor League Baseball. From September 1 through the end of the regular season, each team is required to expand its active roster to 28 players (before the 2020 season, any player on the 40-man reserve list, also referred to as the "expanded roster", was eligible to play in an official regular season game on or after September 1). Many young players make their Major League debuts in this way, as "September call-ups."

To be eligible for a team's postseason roster, a player must be on any of the following: (a) the 40-man reserve list, (b) the injured list, (c) the bereavement list, or (d) the restricted list as of August 31 at midnight ET. The only exception is that a player who is on the injured list at the end of the regular season may be replaced on the postseason roster by any other player who was in the organization on August 31, with the approval of the Commissioner. All players on the team's roster during the season will be eligible to receive a World Series ring after the team wins the World Series.

The August 31 rule was waived in 1945 for servicemen returning from World War II. Over the years, there have been several notable cases where a player acquired after the August 31 deadline made a significant contribution to a playoff-contending team but was ineligible for the postseason; for example, Pedro Ramos with the 1964 New York Yankees and Sparky Lyle with the 1980 Philadelphia Phillies.

== Trades ==
As of 1945, teams may trade only players currently under contract. Trades between two or more major-league teams may freely occur at any time during a window that opens two days after the starting date of the final game of the most recent World Series and closes at 4 pm Eastern Daylight Time (UTC 2000) on July 31. MLB had allowed trades during the month of August if players cleared waivers, but August trades involving players on a team's 40-man reserve list were eliminated after the 2018 season per the Official Major League Rules, 9(b)(3).

Unlike in the NFL, NHL, MLS, and the NBA, teams may not trade draft choices (with the exception of competitive balance draft selections, which can be traded as explained below), but may purchase the rights to Rule 5 Draft Picks.

Beginning with the 2012 season, MLB allows one specific class of draft picks to be traded. As part of a signed collective bargaining agreement between MLB and its players' union, each team is allocated a "bonus pool"—a set amount of money it can use to sign its draft picks for that year. Teams that go over their threshold can be penalized by losing one or more future draft picks. Those forfeited draft picks will eventually end up in the possession of small-revenue teams, which can then trade them if they wish. The first picks awarded under this scheme were for the 2013 draft.

If a player has been on an active major league roster for 10 full seasons and on one team for the last five, he may not be traded to another team without his consent (known as the 10 & 5 rule). Additionally, some players negotiate to have no-trade clauses in their contracts that have the same effect.

In some trades, one of the components is a "player to be named later" which usually turns out to be a minor league player. The unnamed player is included as part of a trade when the teams cannot immediately agree on a specific player or when the player is not yet eligible to be traded. In these cases, the player in question must be named within six months. Cash or some other consideration may be exchanged in lieu of the player to be named later. For example, during the 1994 Major League Baseball strike, the Minnesota Twins traded Dave Winfield to the Cleveland Indians at the trade deadline. Among the conditions of the trade were that if the Indians played no more games in 1994, "Indians general manager John Hart must write a check for $100 made out to the Minnesota Twins and take Twins general manager Andy MacPhail out to dinner."

== Waivers ==
Any player under contract may be placed on waivers ("waived") at any time. Before the abolition of August trades in 2019, teams were required to place any player they wished to trade after MLB's July 31 trade deadline on waivers before trading him.

If a player is waived, any team may claim him. If more than one team claims the player from waivers, the team with the weakest record in the player's league gets preference. If no team in the player's league claims him, the claiming team with the weakest record in the other league gets preference. In the first month of the season, preference is determined using the previous year's standings.

If a team claims a player off waivers and has a viable claim as described above, his current team (the "waiving team") may choose one of the following options:

- arrange a trade with the claiming team for that player within two business days of the claim; or
- do nothing and allow the claiming team to assume the player's existing contract, pay the waiving team a waiver fee, and place the player on its active major league roster.

Prior to 2019, teams had a third option: Refuse the claiming team's request and keep the player on its major league roster, effectively canceling the waiver. In that case, the waiving team could not use the option again for that player in that season—a subsequent waiver would be irrevocable with a claiming team getting the player essentially for nothing.

If no team claims a player off waivers after three business days, the player has cleared waivers and may be assigned to a minor league team, traded (to any team), or released outright.

The waiver "wire" is a secret within the personnel of the Major League Baseball clubs; no official announcement of a waiver is made until a transaction actually occurs, although information sometimes leaks out. Before the abolition of post-July 31 trades, players were often waived during the post-July "waiver-required" trading period for teams to gauge trade interest in a particular player. Usually, when the player was claimed, the waiving team would rescind the waiver to avoid losing the player unless a trade could be worked out with the claiming team.

The National League (NL) was the first of the two major leagues to adopt the trade deadline rule in 1917. Originally it was enforced after June 15, but was later changed as the result of a new collective bargaining agreement. For many years, players could not be traded from one league to another without being waived by all of the teams in the trading team's league. Then, in 1959, an inter-league trading period was established, centered on the winter baseball meetings in December. Later, there were two "inter-league" trading periods each year, one from after the World Series until mid-December and the second from a week before spring training began until March 15. So intent were leagues on keeping their stars from being moved from one league to the other, that then–National League President Warren Giles threatened to keep NL clubs from trading major stars to the American League after the deal that sent Frank Robinson from Cincinnati to Baltimore.

== Assignment to a minor league team ==
=== Options ===
Options are directed by MLB Rule 11 (C). A player has a finite number of option years in which he may be moved between the major and minor leagues up to five times per season as of 2022; previously, a player could be optioned an unlimited amount of times subject to the 15 day wait period for pitchers and two-way players and 10 day wait period for hitters except when either the "27th man" or injured list exception applied. If a player is on the 40-man reserve list but not on the active major league roster, he is said to be on optional assignment—his organization may freely move him between the major league club and the minor league club. The rules for this are as follows. (In all cases, an assignment of a player on a major-league injured list to the minors while on a rehabilitation assignment does not count as time spent in the minors.)

- Once a player has been placed on a team's 40-man reserve list, a team has 3 option years on that player.
  - A player is considered to have used one of those three option years when he spends at least 20 days in the minors in any of those 3 seasons.
- A team may have a fourth option year on a player with less than five full seasons of professional experience, provided that both conditions below are met.
  1. A player has not spent at least 90 days on an active professional roster in a season. Minor leagues that play below Class A Advanced have seasons that are shorter than 90 days, and as such, any player who spends a full season in a rookie or Class A (short-season) league will receive a fourth option year.
  2. A player has not spent at least 60 days on an active professional roster AND then at least 30 days on an injured list in a season. Only after 60 days have been spent on an active professional roster does time spent on the injured list count towards the 90-day threshold. As with the prior example, this cannot occur with players who spend a full season in a rookie or Class A (short season) league.

Per the current collective bargaining agreement between MLB and the Players Association, effective as of the 2022 season, a player may be optioned to the minor leagues no more than five times in a given season. Once a player is optioned to the minors (except if recalled to serve as the "27th man" for a doubleheader), a player cannot be recalled to the majors for 10 days (if a position player) or 15 days (if a pitcher or two-way player) unless another player is placed on the injured list and a recall is to replace that player. Once all of the options have been used up on a player, a player is considered "out of options" and a player must be placed on and clear waivers prior to being sent down to the minor leagues (there is also the "veterans' consent" rule).

The option system was designed to prevent players from being buried in the minor leagues forever, by forcing teams to make a decision within a limited number of years on whether or not they can use a player in the Major Leagues. Once placed on the protected 40-man reserve list the player knows his team will have to bring him up to the majors, or expose him to being claimed on waivers so that another team can bring him to the majors, all within three years. Options do not "reset" if a player is traded - he still has only the original three option years that began when he was first placed on a team's 40-man reserve list.

=== Designated for assignment ===
A player who is designated for assignment (DFA) is immediately removed from the 40-man reserve list. This gives the team time to decide what to do with the player while freeing up a roster spot for another transaction, if needed. Once a player is designated for assignment, the team has seven days (it had been 10 days under the 2012–2016 Collective Bargaining Agreement) to do one of the following: the player can be traded, the player can be released, or the player can be put on waivers and, provided he clears, outrighted to the minors. A player who is outrighted to the minors is removed from the 40-man reserve list but is still paid according to the terms of his guaranteed contract. A player can only be outrighted once in his career without his consent.

=== Veterans' consent ===
If a player has 5 years of major-league service, he may not be assigned to a minor-league team without his consent. This exclusion applies regardless of whether he has not yet been outrighted once, has remaining options, or has cleared waivers. If the player withholds consent, the team must either release him or keep him on the major league roster. In either case, the player must continue to be paid under the terms of his contract. If he is released and signs with a new team, his previous team must pay the difference in salary between the two contracts if the previous contract called for a greater salary.

== Injured list ==
If a major league player cannot play because of a medical condition, he may be placed on the 10-day injured list (IL) (15 days prior to the 2017 season; to be changed back to 15-days beginning the 2020 season). This removes the player from the 26-man roster, freeing up a space, but the player is ineligible to play for at least 10 consecutive days. Players on the 10-day injured list are still a part of the 40-man roster. An injured player may also be placed on the 60-day injured list to remove the player from the 40-man roster as well, with the condition of being ineligible to play for at least 60 consecutive days. However, the 40-man roster must be full before a player can be placed on the 60-day IL.

In 2011, a 7-day injured list was added specifically for players who have suffered a concussion. This was instituted to allow players who may recover from their concussions quickly to be removed from the active roster and replaced for a shorter period of time than the standard IL term. A player who is still suffering from concussion symptoms at the 7-day mark is automatically transferred to the 10-day IL. Both the brain injury and the player's recovery need to be verified by team and league doctors; the list is not intended for non-concussion injuries.

Players placed on the 7-day or 10-day injured list may be moved to the 60-day injured list at any time, but not vice versa. Players may be placed on any injured list retroactively for a maximum of three inactive days and may remain on either list for as long as required to recover. During this 3-day period, a player's status is said to be day-to-day, indicating that the team is in the process of deciding whether the player must be placed on either IL or is healthy enough to return to active service. Injured players may not be traded without permission of the Commissioner nor may they be optioned to the minors, though they may be assigned to a minor league club for rehabilitation for a limited amount of time (30 days for pitchers, 20 for non-pitchers).

Until 2018, the injured list (IL) was called the disabled list (DL). MLB changed the name of the disabled list to the injured list beginning the 2019 season.

== Personal leave ==
=== Bereavement list ===
The bereavement list may be used when a player finds it necessary to leave the team to attend to a serious illness or death in his (or his spouse's) immediate family. A player placed on the bereavement list must miss a minimum of three games and a maximum of seven games. The team can use another player from its 40-man roster to replace a player on the bereavement list. It was adopted beginning with the 2003 season.

=== Paternity leave list ===
The paternity leave list may be used when a player chooses to leave the team to attend the birth of his child. A player placed on the paternity leave list must miss the next team game, but no more than three games. The team can use another player from its 40-man roster to replace a player on the paternity leave list. This list was adopted beginning with the 2011 season.

== Rule 5 draft ==
If a player not on a 40-man reserve list has spent four years with a minor-league contract, originally signed when 19 or older or five years when signed before the age of 19, he is eligible to be chosen by any team in the rule 5 draft during the offseason. No team is required to choose a player in the draft, but some do. If chosen, the player must be kept on the selecting team's 26-man major league roster for the entire season after the draft—he may not be optioned or designated to the minors. The selecting team may, at any time, waive the rule 5 draftee, such as when they no longer wish to keep him on their major league roster. If a rule 5 draftee clears waivers, he must be offered back to the original team, effectively canceling the rule 5 draft choice. Once a rule 5 draftee spends an entire season on his new team's 26-man roster, his status reverts to normal and he may be optioned or designated for assignment. To prevent the abuse of the rule 5 draft, the rule also states that the draftee must be active for at least 90 days. This keeps teams from drafting players, then "hiding" them on the injured list for the majority of the season. For example, if a rule 5 draftee was only active for 67 days in his first season with his new club, he must be active for an additional 23 days in his second season to satisfy the rule 5 requirements.

Any player chosen in the rule 5 draft may be traded to any team while under the rule 5 restrictions, but the restrictions transfer to the new team. If the new team does not want to keep the player on their 26-man roster for the season, he must be offered back to the team he was on when he was chosen in the draft.

The intent of the rule 5 draft is to prevent teams from holding major league-potential players in the minor leagues when other teams would be willing to have them play in the majors. However, this draft has also become an opportunity for a team to take a top prospect from another team who might not be ready for the major leagues. For example, Cy Young Award winner Johan Santana was chosen by the Florida Marlins four years before winning the award, when the Houston Astros declined to put him on their 40-man roster. The Marlins chose Santana in the 1999 rule 5 draft, and traded him to the Minnesota Twins who kept him on their roster for the 2000 season, in which he toiled to a 6.49 earned run average at only 21 years of age. Two years later, he legitimized himself as a Major League pitcher, with an ERA under 3.00, and two years after that, he was recognized as one of the best pitchers in the league. Had he not been chosen in the rule 5 draft, he likely would not have made his major-league debut until the 2001 or the 2002 season with the Astros.

Roberto Clemente is the only Rule 5 draft pick to be inducted into the Hall of Fame, having been selected by the Pittsburgh Pirates from the then Brooklyn Dodgers in 1955.

== See also ==
- Free agency (Major League Baseball), the rules that apply to free agents in MLB seeking new contracts or salary arbitration
