= Barry Svrluga =

American baseball sportswriter

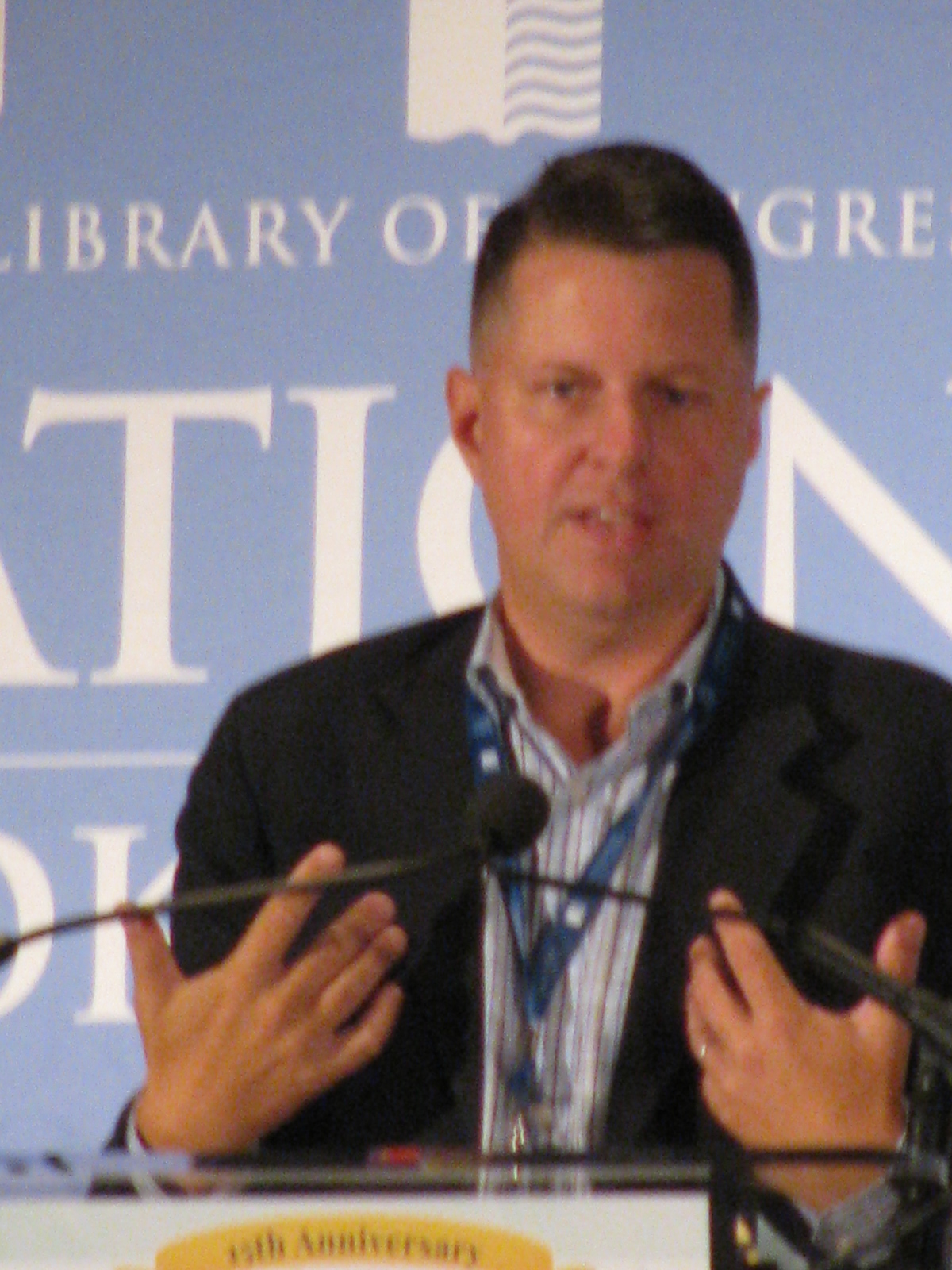
- Education: Duke University
- Writing career
- Genres: Non-Fiction, Sports

Barry Svrluga was a sports columnist for The Washington Post, WashingtonPost.com, and is a frequent contributor on The Tony Kornheiser Show.

== Life ==
Barry Svrluga graduated from Duke University and has written for a number of newspapers, from The Leader (Corning) in Corning, New York, to The Portland Press Herald in Maine to The News & Observer in Raleigh, North Carolina, before joining The Washington Post.

He was previously the national baseball writer at the Post. Earlier in his career he was the first beat reporter for the Washington Nationals upon the return of baseball to Washington, DC. He wrote a book, National Pastime, about the Nationals' first season in DC. He later covered the Washington Redskins and he has been a regular member of the Post's Olympic coverage team. While on the Nationals beat, he blogged at the Nationals Journal. The blog dissects and analyzes all things Nationals several times daily.

As beat writer, Svrluga was present the night Barry Bonds hit his 756th home run and wrote the companion piece from the perspective of Nationals starting pitcher Mike Bacsik to Washington Post reporter Dave Sheinin's account of the record breaking home run.

He is a four-time winner of the D.C. Sportswriter of the Year Award.

Svrluga was laid off from The Washington Post on February 4, 2026.

== Works ==
- National Pastime: Sports, Politics and the Return of Baseball to Washington, D.C., Doubleday, 2006, ISBN 9780385517850
- Barry Svrluga (7 July 2015). The Grind: Inside Baseball's Endless Season. Penguin Publishing Group. ISBN 978-0-698-40803-6.
