= Pearson Cup =

Former Major League Baseball rivalry between the teams in Canada

- Teams: Montreal Expos; Toronto Blue Jays
- First meeting: June 29, 1978; Olympic Stadium, Montreal, Canada; Expos 5, Blue Jays 4
- Latest meeting: July 4, 2004; Estadio Hiram Bithorn, San Juan, Puerto Rico; Expos 6, Blue Jays 4
- Stadiums: Expos: Olympic Stadium (1977–2004); Blue Jays: SkyDome (1989–present); Exhibition Stadium (1977–1989)

Statistics
- Total meetings: 43
- Regular season series: Blue Jays, 24–19
- Largest victory: Blue Jays: 14–2 (June 22, 1998); Expos: 11–2 (June 10, 2000)
- Longest win streak: Expos: 4 games (June 14, 2002 – June 28, 2002); Blue Jays: 6 games (July 2, 1997 – June 4, 1999)
- Current win streak: defunct

Locations of the Toronto Blue Jays and Montreal Expos in 2004

The Pearson Cup (French: Coupe Pearson) was an annual midseason Major League Baseball rivalry between former Canadian rivals, the Toronto Blue Jays and Montreal Expos. Named after former prime minister Lester B. Pearson, it was originally created to raise money for minor league baseball in Canada. In later years, it was incorporated into the regular season interleague baseball schedule.

The series began in 1978, and ran until 1986. Due to a strike, no game was played in 1981. In 2003, the series was revived as part of the Blue Jays–Expos interleague rivalry. It continued on into the 2004 season, after which the Expos moved to Washington, D.C., and became the Washington Nationals. The cup is now on display in the Canadian Baseball Hall of Fame in St. Marys, Ontario.

== Results ==
From 1978 to 1986, the Cup was awarded after a one-game exhibition, that had no effect on the major league standings. The 1979 and 1985 games were abandoned as ties due to time constraints; in 1979 the Expos had to catch an airplane flight, while in 1985 the Jays had to catch a flight.

The game was suspended in 1987 as the two teams could not find a mutually agreeable date to play the game. There was discussion about reviving the game in the preseason, or playing it in another Canadian city such as Vancouver, but this never took place.

During the 2003 and 2004 series, the Cup was awarded after a six-game set, three in Toronto and three in Montreal. These games counted in major-league standings and were played during the regular season.

Single exhibition games
Season	Date	Location	Visiting team	Runs	Home team	Attendance	Ref	Cumulative record	
1978	June 29	Olympic Stadium	Toronto	4–5 (10)	Montreal	20,221		Montreal 1–0–0	
1979	April 19	Exhibition Stadium	Montreal	4–4 (11)	Toronto	21,564		Montreal 1–0–1	
1980	July 31	Olympic Stadium	Toronto	1–3	Montreal	6,731		Montreal 2–0–1	
1981	July 6	Exhibition Stadium	Cancelled due to players' strike					Montreal 2–0–1	
1982	September 2	Exhibition Stadium	Montreal	7–3	Toronto	23,102		Montreal 3–0–1	
1983	May 5	Olympic Stadium	Toronto	7–5	Montreal	8,291		Montreal 3–1–1	
1984	May 24	Exhibition Stadium	Montreal	5–6 (13)	Toronto	24,768		Montreal 3–2–1	
1985	May 9	Olympic Stadium	Toronto	2–2 (11)	Montreal	11,075		Montreal 3–2–2	
1986	April 28	Exhibition Stadium	Montreal	2–5	Toronto	16,786		Tied 3–3–2	
Regular season series
Season	Date	Location	Visiting team	Games	Home team	Average Attendance	Ref	Series	Cumulative record
2003	June 20–22	Olympic Stadium	Toronto	2–1	Montreal	12,782		Tied; 3–3	Tied 3–3–3
2003	June 27–29	SkyDome	Montreal	2–1	Toronto	31,571		Tied; 3–3	Tied 3–3–3
2004	June 25–27	SkyDome	Montreal	1–2	Toronto	22,091		Tied; 3–3	Tied 3–3–4
2004	July 2–4	Hiram Bithorn Stadium (San Juan, Puerto Rico)	Toronto	1–2	Montreal	8,443		Tied; 3–3	Tied 3–3–4

== The All-Canadian Series ==
The Blue Jays and Expos first played meaningful baseball in the 1997 season with the introduction of interleague play, with the teams being designated natural rivals. In 1997, the teams played three games at Toronto; the two teams played home and home series for the first time in 1998. The series was a decided boost to the paltry attendance numbers at Olympic Stadium in Montreal, and gave a modest increase in attendance at SkyDome in Toronto; it failed, however, to become a serious rivalry amongst the players or the fans. Some people attribute this to a lack of Canadian players on both teams, while others point to the general discontent of Canadians with Major League Baseball during the late 1990s and early 2000s.

Major League Baseball put the final nail in the Series' coffin by playing the final set between the Jays and Expos in San Juan, Puerto Rico instead of Montreal. Major League Baseball's intention to boost attendance by playing in San Juan ended up resulting in lower attendance than the series had attracted in Montreal a year earlier.

The All-Canadian Series ended after 2004 when the Expos were relocated and became known as the Washington Nationals. The Blue Jays won the series 24 games to 19 games, and Toronto also won the most season series (3–2–2).

== Season-by-season results ==
The two teams met annually from 1997 to 2004 as part of the All-Canadian Series, then met annually again starting in 2023 as a result of the scheduling formula change, meeting intermittently from 2005 to 2022.

Toronto Blue Jays vs. Montreal Expos/Washington Nationals Season-by-Season Results
1990s (Blue Jays, 9–4)

Season	Season series		at Toronto Blue Jays	at Montreal Expos	Overall series	Notes
1997	Expos	2‍–‍1	Expos; 2‍–‍1	no games	Expos; 2‍–‍1	First regular season games played between the two clubs First regular season games played between two Canadian teams Only time Expos have held the overall series lead
1998	Blue Jays	4‍–‍0	Blue Jays; 2‍–‍0	Blue Jays; 2‍–‍0	Blue Jays; 5‍–‍2	First regular season games played between the two clubs at Olympic Stadium; First season series sweep by either team
1999	Blue Jays	4‍–‍2	Blue Jays; 2‍–‍1	Blue Jays; 2‍–‍1	Blue Jays; 9‍–‍4	First year of 6-game home and away format

2000s (Blue Jays, 24–21)

Season	Season series		at Toronto Blue Jays	at Montreal Expos/Washington Nationals	Overall series	Notes
2000	Blue Jays	4‍–‍2	Blue Jays; 2‍–‍1	Blue Jays; 2‍–‍1	Blue Jays; 13‍–‍6	
2001	Tie	3‍–‍3	Blue Jays; 2‍–‍1	Expos; 2‍–‍1	Blue Jays; 16‍–‍9	
2002	Expos	4‍–‍2	Blue Jays; 2‍–‍1	Expos; 3‍–‍0	Blue Jays; 18‍–‍13	
2003	Tie	3‍–‍3	Expos; 2‍–‍1	Blue Jays; 2‍–‍1	Blue Jays; 21‍–‍16	Last meetings played in Montreal
2004	Tie	3‍–‍3	Blue Jays; 2‍–‍1	Expos; 2‍–‍1	Blue Jays; 24‍–‍19	Expos played their home games during this series in San Juan, Puerto Rico. Most recent MLB games between two Canadian franchises.
2005	Tie	3‍–‍3	Blue Jays; 2‍–‍1	Nationals; 2‍–‍1	Blue Jays; 27‍–‍22	First meetings between the Nationals and Blue Jays. Last 6-game series meeting Only Washington-Toronto meeting to have games played in both cities Intended as Pearson Cup matchup due to 2005 schedule already being set
2006	Blue Jays	3‍–‍0	Blue Jays; 3‍–‍0	no games	Blue Jays; 30‍–‍22	Second season series sweep for Blue Jays
2007	Blue Jays	2‍–‍1	Blue Jays; 2‍–‍1	no games	Blue Jays; 32‍–‍23	
2009	Nationals	2‍–‍1	no games	Nationals; 2‍–‍1	Blue Jays; 33‍–‍25	

2010s (Blue Jays, 5–4)

Season	Season series		at Toronto Blue Jays	at Washington Nationals	Overall series	Notes
2012	Nationals	3‍–‍0	Nationals; 3‍–‍0	no games	Blue Jays; 33‍–‍28	First season series sweep for Expos/Nationals franchise
2015	Blue Jays	2‍–‍1	no games	Blue Jays; 2‍–‍1	Blue Jays; 35‍–‍29	
2018	Blue Jays	3‍–‍0	Blue Jays; 3‍–‍0	no games	Blue Jays; 38‍–‍29	Third season series sweep for Blue Jays

2020s (Blue Jays, 11–9)

Season	Season series		at Toronto Blue Jays	at Washington Nationals	Overall series	Notes
2020	Tie	2‍–‍2	no games	Tie; 2‍–‍2	Blue Jays; 40‍–‍31	Both Blue Jays home games relocated to Nationals Park due to the COVID-19 pandemic, as their alternate stadium (Sahlen Field) in Buffalo, New York was being prepared. These are considered home games for the Nationals, per official statistics, though each team played two games batting in the bottom of innings.
2021	Nationals	3‍–‍1	Tie; 1‍–‍1	Nationals; 2‍–‍0	Blue Jays; 41‍–‍34	Both Blue Jays home games played at TD Ameritrade Park (their Spring Training venue) due to the COVID-19 pandemic.
2023	Blue Jays	2‍–‍1	Blue Jays; 2‍–‍1	no games	Blue Jays; 43‍–‍35	Beginning this season, teams play three games annually in alternating venues as MLB adopts a new scheduling format.
2024	Nationals	2‍–‍1	no games	Nationals; 2‍–‍1	Blue Jays; 44‍–‍37	
2025	Blue Jays	3‍–‍0	Blue Jays; 3‍–‍0	no games	Blue Jays; 47‍–‍37	
2026	Blue Jays	2‍–‍1	no games	Blue Jays; 2‍–‍1	Blue Jays; 49‍–‍38	

Summary of Results

Season	Season series		at Toronto Blue Jays	at Montreal Expos/Washington Nationals	Notes
Toronto Blue Jays vs Montreal Expos	Blue Jays	24‍–‍19	Blue Jays, 14‍–‍9	Tie, 10‍–‍10	
Toronto Blue Jays vs Washington Nationals	Blue Jays	25‍–‍19	Blue Jays, 16‍–‍7	Nationals, 12‍–‍9	
Overall Regular season	Blue Jays	49‍–‍38	Blue Jays, 30‍–‍16	Expos/Nationals, 22‍–‍19	
Seasonal record	Season series		at Toronto Blue Jays	at Montreal Expos/Washington Nationals	Notes
Toronto Blue Jays vs Montreal Expos series	Blue Jays	3‍–‍2‍–‍3			
Toronto Blue Jays vs Washington Nationals series	Blue Jays	7‍–‍4‍–‍2			
Overall Regular season series	Blue Jays	10‍–‍6‍–‍5			

== Notes ==
- Canadian Bill Atkinson was the winning pitcher and scored the winning run for the Expos in the first-ever Pearson Cup game at the Olympic Stadium in 1978.
- Pedro Martínez was the winning pitcher on June 30, 1997, in the first game of 'The All-Canadian Series', pitching 9 innings, striking out 10, walking one.

== See also ==
- Interleague play
- Canadiens–Maple Leafs rivalry
- 401 derby
- Major League Baseball rivalries
- Beltway Series, the rivalry series currently played by the Nationals after moving from Montreal to Washington.
- Bay Bridge Series, the defunct inter-league rivalry between the San Francisco Giants of the National League and the Oakland Athletics of the American League respectively which started during the 1989 World Series which the Athletics won and started in 1997 when regular season inter-league play began and the rivalry lasted until 2024 when the Athletics franchise relocated from Oakland to Sacramento for an interim period pending a permanent move to Las Vegas by 2028.
