= Thom Loverro =

American sportswriter

Thomas F. Loverro (born March 25, 1954, in Brooklyn, New York), is an American sportswriter. He was voted by the National Sports Media Association the Maryland sportswriter of the year in 2009 and District of Columbia sportswriter of the year in 2014.

He previously co-hosted a sports talk radio show on ESPN 980 radio in Washington called The Sports Fix. He is currently working at 106.7 The Fan.

Thom Loverro has been a professional journalist since 1977, working for a number of newspapers, including eight years as a news editor and reporter for The Baltimore Sun, where he covered government, politics and crime. He moved into sports reporting when he joined The Washington Times in 1992 and remained until 2009.

Loverro was a sport columnist with Washington Examiner from 2010 to 2013. He returned to The Washington Times as a sports columnist in September 2013.

Loverro has written 11 books, including, Hail Victory: an Oral History of The Washington Redskins and The Encyclopedia of Negro League Baseball.
