= Lone Star Series =

Major League Baseball rivalry

- Houston Astros Texas Rangers
- Location: Texas
- First meeting: June 8, 2001; The Ballpark in Arlington, Arlington; Astros 5, Rangers 4
- Latest meeting: August 2, 2026; Astros 7, Rangers 3 Daikin Park, Houston
- Next meeting: March 25, 2027; Daikin Park, Houston
- Stadiums: Astros: Daikin Park; Rangers: Globe Life Field

Statistics
- Total meetings: 312
- All-time series: Astros, 158–154 (.506)
- Regular season series: Astros, 155–150 (.508)
- Postseason results: Rangers, 4–3 (.571)
- Largest victory: Astros, 15–1 (September 13, 2021); Rangers, 18–3 (July 4, 2004; May 21, 2005)
- Longest win streak: Astros, 8 (May 12–July 4, 2018); Rangers, 10 (July 7, 2013–April 11, 2014)
- Current win streak: Astros, 3

Post-season history
- 2023 AL Championship Series: Rangers won, 4–3

Locations of the Houston Astros and Texas Rangers

The Lone Star Series (also known as the Silver Boot Series) is a Major League Baseball (MLB) rivalry featuring Texas' two major league franchises, the Houston Astros and Texas Rangers. It is an outgrowth of the "natural rivalry" established by MLB as part of interleague play as the Rangers are a member of the American League (AL) and the Astros were a member of the National League (NL) until 2012. During interleague play, the winner of the six-game series was awarded the Silver Boot, a 30-inch (760 mm) tall display of a size 15 cowboy boot cast in silver, complete with a custom, handmade spur. If each team had won three games each for a tie, the declared winner was the team that scored the most runs over the course of the series. In 2013, the Astros joined the American League West with the Rangers and changed their rivalry from an interleague to an intradivision contest. The rivalry, which was once dormant, has become far more heated in recent seasons. From 2013 to 2022 (excluding the shortened 2020 season), 19 games were played each season. Beginning in 2023, the teams play each other 13 times a year.

== Background ==
The Greater Houston and Dallas–Fort Worth metroplex (DFW) areas have been rivals in sports and other areas for many years. Differences, not related to baseball, include the weather during the summer, population, cultural, and allegiance preferences between the different regions of Texas. Both Greater Houston and DFW have humid subtropical climates; however, DFW mostly has dry winds in the summer and sometimes icy conditions in the winter, with some frost at night, compared to Greater Houston's severe relative humidity and minimal wind, except near the coast, and milder winter conditions. The Metroplex is located inland in North Texas while Houston is in the face of the Gulf of Mexico in Southeast Texas. The city of Dallas has the ninth largest population in the United States and third largest population in Texas; the city of Houston has the fourth largest population in the United States and largest population in Texas. DFW is the fourth largest metropolitan area in the United States, while the Greater Houston area is the fifth largest.

== History ==
The Lone Star Series was the consequence of many things that happened to Texas in the 1950s: population shift westward from metropolitan areas on the East Coast, the space program, more modernized higher education, and the formation of the brief Continental League resulting in expansion in Major League Baseball shortly thereafter.

=== 1962: Texas has its first major league team, the Colt .45s ===
The first serious proposal to bring big league baseball to Texas came in the late 1950s with the planned Continental League, in which charter franchises were granted for both Dallas-Fort Worth and Houston. Ultimately, the Continental League never played a game, but only because the established leagues responded by granting two expansion franchises each. One of the new teams was the Houston Colt .45s, who joined the National League in 1962.

The Colt .45's played in Colt Stadium for the first three years of existence, fighting against hot and humid weather and outrageously large mosquitoes, which also had an effect on the fans. Unbelievably, they did not play a Sunday night baseball game at home until June 9, 1963, which was also the major leagues' first Sunday night game. The Astros, as they came to be with the new all-weathered Harris County Domed Stadium, really did not have a strong rivalry with any team in the NL, except for the St. Louis Cardinals and later on the Cincinnati Reds and Atlanta Braves.

During the planning of the second wave of expansion in the big leagues in 1968, the National League considered putting a new team in the Dallas–Fort Worth area by an overwhelming majority of its owners. However, Judge Roy Hofheinz did not want it to happen or allow it because he owned all the television and radio rights in Texas for Astros ballgames. The other owners were in favor, except Hofheinz, of having a rivalry approaching the intensity of the Dodgers–Giants rivalry in the Senior Circuit. San Diego and Montreal were selected instead. The Dallas–Fort Worth area had to wait four more years for a team to arrive when the Senators (see below) moved to Arlington, Texas. It would be another 32 years before there was a meeting between the Rangers and Astros.

=== 1972: Washington Senators move to Arlington to become the Rangers ===
Having been turned down by the National League, Dallas-Fort Worth naturally turned to the American League. At the time, the two major leagues were highly autonomous business entities, and as such Judge Hofheinz was unable to block the eventual arrival of the Junior Circuit in North Texas. Before they were the Texas Rangers, the team belonged to the Beltway as the third version of the Washington Senators where they played mediocre baseball most of the time for the first 11 years of existence. They replaced the old Washington Senators who had moved to the Minneapolis–Saint Paul area to become the Minnesota Twins in 1961. The new Senators changed into the Texas Rangers in time for the 1972 season, and so a rivalry was born. (At one time, the Kansas City Athletics were interested in moving to the Dallas/Fort Worth area in the early 1960s but were voted down, 9–1, by the other American League owners.) The Astros have been in Texas ten years longer than the Rangers, but the Senators/Rangers franchise is one year older than the Astros. They met, starting in 1992, at the end of spring training with the Rangers winning 2–0 and claiming the very first Silver Boot. On April 2, 1993, Nolan Ryan returned to the Astrodome as a member of the Texas Rangers in front of 53,657, the biggest crowd to see a big league game in Texas up to that point. The Rangers won the last two exhibition games, a 6–5 victory in Arlington in 1999 and a 9–3 victory at Houston in 2000, before the two teams met for the first time in regular season in 2001.

=== 1996–2012: First official meetings and interleague play ===
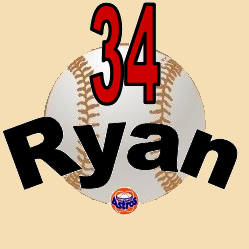
Nolan Ryan's number 34 was retired by the Houston Astros in 1996.

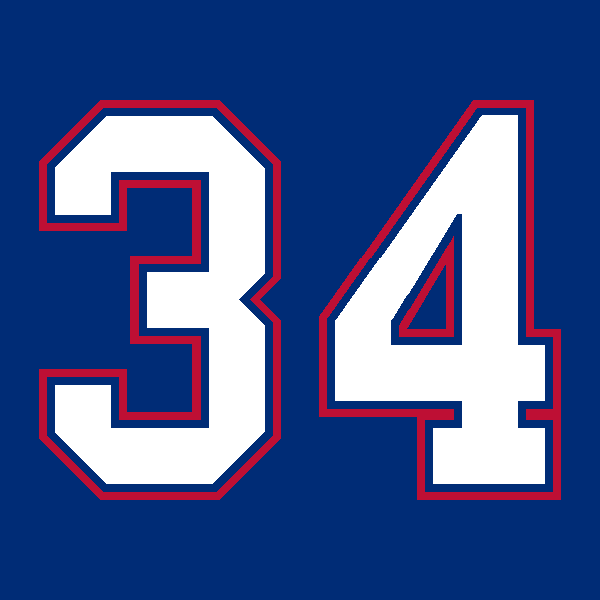
Nolan Ryan's number 34 was retired by the Texas Rangers in 1996.

One year before their first official matchup in interleague play, both teams retired the number of Hall of Famer Nolan Ryan, who had successful runs with both teams. During the 1997 off-season, "radical" realignment plans were bandied around about possibly rearranging teams from one league to another, especially Houston and Texas. In order to cut down on traveling costs and align teams together based on geography, the MLB owners came up with many plans to put the Astros and Rangers in a more suitable placement together. However, the American League and National League would lose their respective identities in the process. (The only move was the Brewers from the AL Central to the NL Central.) One of the plans in 2000 even featured the Texas Rangers in a six-team AL Central, so that they would be with other teams in the Central Time Zone, while the fledgling Arizona Diamondbacks would have had to leave the NL West for the AL West to replace the Rangers. During the 2005–06 off-season, the Florida Marlins were considering moving to San Antonio, among other cities, due to the lack of funding for a new stadium. Another professional baseball team in Texas, whether by relocation or expansion, in either league would create greater rivalries, similar to the kind in the NBA with the Spurs, Mavericks, and Rockets, and possible realignment issues.

The Lone Star Series was not conceived until 2001, four years after interleague play began. It was only logical to have the Rangers and Astros matched together since they are the only MLB teams representing Texas. Since both played in two different divisions (AL West and NL Central, respectively), Major League Baseball had to rectify the oversight even though interleague play would not be rotated from division to division on a yearly basis until 2002.

There has only been one rainout in the history of the Lone Star Series. A game scheduled for Sunday June 30, 2002, at Rangers Ballpark in Arlington was postponed due to rain and rescheduled for Monday, September 2. The Rangers won the last game of the year against the Astros, 7–2, in front of a crowd of 24,468, but the Astros won the Silver Boot regardless of the outcome of the game.

On July 1, 2006, Rangers outfielder Gary Matthews Jr. stole a home run from Astro Mike Lamb (a former Ranger) in what was considered one of the greatest catches of the decade according to MLB Network. At that time according to Lamb and Mark Teixeira, the Rangers-Astros "rivalry" was more for the fans in Texas than like a bitter rivalry (e.g. Windy City Series).

Beginning in 2008, the Lone Star Series saw for the first time two African-American managers go head-to-head against one another, the Astros' Cecil Cooper and the Rangers' Ron Washington. This situation lasted for two years. On February 6, 2008, Nolan Ryan became the Rangers' team president after being the special assistant to general manager, scouting players, and holding pitching camps with the Astros for the previous three seasons.

On August 18, 2009, the Rangers acquired Iván Rodríguez in a trade from the Houston Astros to help them down the stretch for the purpose of achieving their first playoff appearance in ten years. It was Rodriguez's second stint with Texas. The team had a winning season but did not qualify for the postseason.

On September 14, 2010, the Astros' Triple-A affiliate, the Round Rock Express, announced that they would become the Rangers' new minor league affiliate. This change left the Astros without a Triple-A team and the Rangers' old Triple-A team, the Oklahoma City RedHawks, without a parent club. On September 20, 2010, the Astros made the RedHawks their own affiliate. These changes went into effect for the 2011 season.

=== 2013–present: Astros join the American League ===
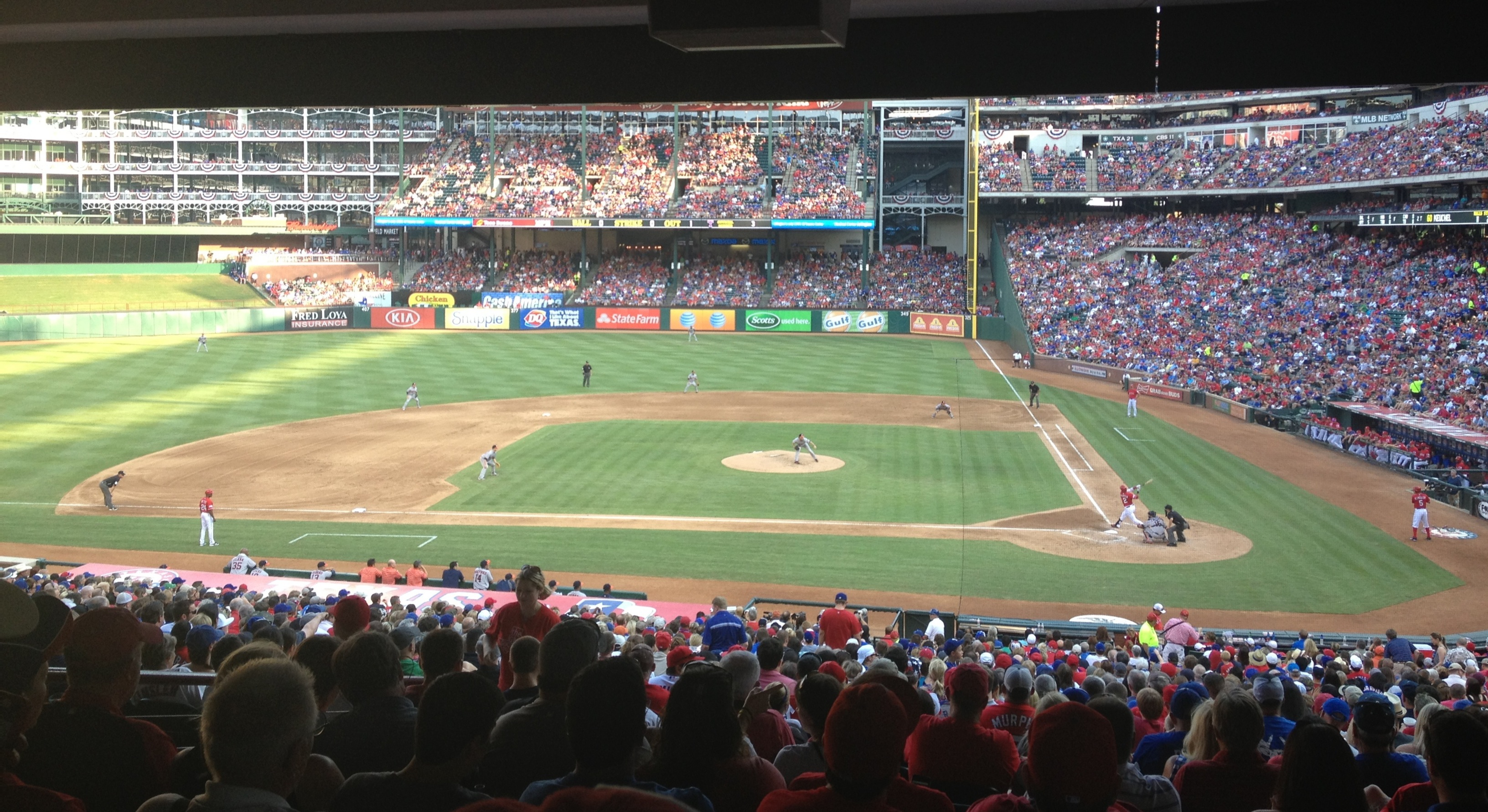
The Rangers host the Astros at Globe Life Park in Arlington during the 2013 edition of the Lone Star Series

Major League Baseball approved the sale of the Astros on November 11, 2011, to Jim Crane on the condition they join the American League West. The Rangers, located in the Central Time Zone, had many of their games start late in the Pacific Time Zone due to the Angels, Athletics, and Mariners all being located on the West Coast. To help ease the Rangers' schedule, Commissioner Bud Selig required that the Astros join the AL West in 2013, so both teams would have another division rival in relatively close geographical proximity to one another while ensuring that both the AL West and the National League Central both would have the same number of teams as the other divisions. The move's consequence for the rest of the league resulted in all teams having to play interleague games year round due to the odd number of teams in each league. Another consequence would be an increase in intensity of the Lone Star baseball rivalry.

The Astros and Rangers played each other on Opening Day on March 31, 2013, with the Astros winning convincingly at home. The next game, Rangers pitcher Yu Darvish was one out away from a perfect game when Marwin González hit a single through Darvish's legs.

On February 11, 2014, Nolan Ryan returned to the Astros as an executive advisor to his son, Reid, the president of business operations; general manager Jeff Luhnow; and owner Jim Crane. Nolan Ryan is also the only person to be named DHL Hometown Hero by two organizations (the Rangers and the Astros).

In April 2015, a brawl started between Rougned Odor and Hank Conger, which started when Odor, staring down the pitcher out of the batter's box, exchanged words with Conger when the catcher told him to get back. While the umpire quickly got in the middle of the two advancing toward each other, both teams soon swarmed close to each other, which included Prince Fielder (the batter scheduled to hit after Odor), who pushed Conger aside while having his bat with him. Astros manager A. J. Hinch grabbed Prince Fielder, while Fielder shoved back. This was followed by Rangers manager Jeff Banister getting nose to nose with Hinch; shouting and pointing aside, no punches were thrown and no ejections were issued. Later in September, with both teams in contention for the playoffs, the Astros and Rangers faced each other in a pivotal series, with Texas sweeping all four games. The Rangers, who entered the series 1.5 games behind Houston for the AL West lead, ended the series leading the Astros by 2.5 games. The Rangers clinched the 2015 AL West Division title, while the Astros entered the 2015 playoffs as a Wild Card team. The Rangers marked the AL West division title by taunting the Astros with a parody of the Astros' "Come And Take It!" campaign by proclaiming "We Came And Took It!" during a game at Globe Life Park; the two teams would have met in the ALCS had they each won their respective ALDS but both lost in Game 5. In 2017, the rivalry between the Astros and Rangers continued to heat up. During a radio interview Rangers manager Jeff Bannister was quoted as saying, "All I know is they get to put Houston on their chest. We get to put Texas on ours." Astros pitcher Lance McCullers Jr. fired back on Twitter stating, “It’s because nobody knows what Arlington is." Later in the 2017 season after Hurricane Harvey hit Houston, controversy arose when the Astros and Rangers could not negotiate swapping series forcing the Astros to play a series of home games against the Rangers at the Tampa Bay Rays' stadium (Tropicana Field) in Florida. The Rangers won the series 2–1 but lost the season series 7–12. The Astros swept the Rangers in the final three games of the series and outscored the Rangers 42–8 in the final four games. The Rangers did not make the 2017 playoffs, and the Astros clinched their first World Series championship, the first World Series Championship in the Astros-Rangers rivalry and the first World Series title for the State of Texas.

When the Astros played the Opening Day game in 2018 as defending World Series champions, they did so in Arlington, which they won 4–1. Houston was victorious in both the 2018 and 2019 Silver Boot Series as they won the AL West both seasons, making three consecutive division titles for the club with 100 wins in each season. Meanwhile, Texas continued to rebuild and had losing seasons for the second and third year in a row.

The Astros made history at the expense of the Rangers on June 15, 2022, when Luis Garcia and Phil Maton each pitched an immaculate inning for the Astros at Globe Life Field. It was the first instance in major league history of two immaculate innings being thrown on the same date and in the same game. Garcia threw his in the second inning and Maton in the seventh, and they both struck out the same trio of hitters—Nathaniel Lowe, Ezequiel Durán, and Brad Miller. The Astro relied on excellent pitching throughout the year to win 106 regular-season games on their way to claiming a second World Series championship, defeating the Philadelphia Phillies in six games.

Prior to the 2023 season, the Rangers hired Bruce Bochy as manager; meanwhile, Dusty Baker served as manager of the Astros. Both men had previously led the San Francisco Giants, including when Bochy led the Giants to their 2010 World Series defeat of the Rangers, his first championship. In their long and distinguished managerial careers, Baker and Bochy also concurrently guided other teams as rivals in the National League since the 1990s, accumulating over 2,000 wins each. The two teams later became the beneficiary of the New York Mets' fire sale, with the Mets trading Justin Verlander back to the Astros, and Max Scherzer to the Rangers. The two had a critical 3-game series in Arlington looming on September 4–6 that saw the Texas Rangers needing to sweep to clinch the season series and a potential tiebreaker as the division race was close, and ESPN described it as "what could be the biggest series in Texas baseball history." The Astros retained the silver boot by proceeding to demolish the Rangers in the series, scoring six runs in the seventh inning of a 13-6 opening win before crushing Texas in the latter two games with five home runs hit in each game, the first time that a team had won the Lone Star Series seven seasons in a row since Texas did so from 2007 to 2013. Both teams reached the postseason together for the first time since 2015. However, the roles were reversed, this time the Astros won the AL West and a first-round bye as the second seed while the Rangers entered as a Wild Card team by winning the season series 9–4, with both advancing to the ALCS to set up the first ever postseason meeting between the teams, and the first LCS to be held entirely in one state. On October 23, the Texas Rangers won the ALCS in Game 7 with a final score of 11–4, which notably saw each team lose every home game. In addition, the mayors of Houston and Arlington made a friendly wager that whichever mayor’s team lost the series would have to wear a jersey from the winning team to a city council meeting. After the Astros lost the series, Houston mayor Sylvester Turner honored the wager and indeed wore a Rangers jersey to a city council meeting.

Overall, the Astros lead in total regular season wins, total playoff appearances (19 to 9, total postseason series wins, total league championships (5 to 3), and total World Series wins (2 to 1).

== Lone Star Series results ==
Astros vs. Rangers Season-by-Season Results
2000s (Rangers, 28–26)

Season	Season series		at Houston Astros	at Texas Rangers	Notes
2001	Tie	3‍–‍3	Rangers, 2‍–‍1	Astros, 2‍–‍1	Teams' first meetings as interleague rivals. Rangers win tiebreaker by outscoring Astros 44–28
2002	Astros	4‍–‍2	Astros, 2‍–‍1	Astros, 2‍–‍1	
2003	Astros	4‍–‍2	Rangers, 2‍–‍1	Astros, 3‍–‍0	
2004	Tie	3‍–‍3	Astros, 2‍–‍1	Rangers, 2‍–‍1	Rangers win tiebreaker by outscoring Astros 42–29
2005	Rangers	4‍–‍2	Astros, 2‍–‍1	Rangers, 3‍–‍0	Astros lose 2005 World Series.
2006	Astros	4‍–‍2	Astros, 2‍–‍1	Astros, 2‍–‍1	
2007	Rangers	4‍–‍2	Rangers, 2‍–‍1	Rangers, 2‍–‍1	
2008	Tie	3‍–‍3	Astros, 2‍–‍1	Rangers, 2‍–‍1	Rangers win tiebreaker by outscoring Astros 34‍–‍28
2009	Rangers	5‍–‍1	Rangers, 3‍–‍0	Rangers, 2‍–‍1	

2010s (Rangers, 87–64)

Season	Season series		at Houston Astros	at Texas Rangers	Notes
2010	Rangers	5‍–‍1	Rangers, 3‍–‍0	Rangers, 2‍–‍1	Rangers lose 2010 World Series.
2011	Rangers	4‍–‍2	Rangers, 2‍–‍1	Rangers, 2‍–‍1	Rangers lose 2011 World Series.
2012	Rangers	5‍–‍1	Rangers, 2‍–‍1	Rangers, 3‍–‍0	
2013	Rangers	17‍–‍2	Rangers, 9‍–‍1	Rangers, 8‍–‍1	Astros move from NL Central to AL West, resulting in this becoming an intra-division rivalry, with the teams meeting 19 times per season.
2014	Astros	11‍–‍8	Rangers, 5‍–‍4	Astros, 7‍–‍3	
2015	Rangers	13‍–‍6	Rangers, 5‍–‍4	Rangers, 8‍–‍2	
2016	Rangers	15‍–‍4	Rangers, 7‍–‍2	Rangers, 8‍–‍2	
2017	Astros	12‍–‍7	Tie, 5‍–‍5	Astros, 7‍–‍2	Astros win 2017 World Series.
2018	Astros	12‍–‍7	Rangers, 6‍–‍3	Astros, 9‍–‍1	
2019	Astros	13‍–‍6	Astros, 9‍–‍0	Rangers, 6‍–‍4	Astros lose 2019 World Series.

2020s (Astros, 68–39)

Season	Season series		at Houston Astros	at Texas Rangers	Notes
2020	Tie	5‍–‍5	Astros, 4‍–‍2	Rangers, 3‍–‍1	10-game series in COVID-19-shortened season. Astros win tiebreaker by outscoring Rangers 42–37.
2021	Astros	14‍–‍5	Astros, 9‍–‍0	Tie, 5‍–‍5	Astros lose 2021 World Series.
2022	Astros	14‍–‍5	Astros, 7‍–‍3	Astros, 7‍–‍2	Astros win 2022 World Series.
2023	Astros	9‍–‍4	Tie, 3‍–‍3	Astros, 6‍–‍1	Rangers win 2023 World Series.
2024	Astros	7‍–‍6	Tie, 3‍–‍3	Astros, 4‍–‍3	
2025	Astros	7‍–‍6	Astros, 4‍–‍2	Rangers, 4‍–‍3	
2026	Astros	9‍–‍4	Astros, 5‍–‍1	Astros, 4‍–‍3	

Summary of Results

Season	Season series		at Houston Astros	at Texas Rangers	Notes
Regular Season	Astros	155‍–‍150	Astros, 81‍–‍70	Rangers, 80‍–‍74	Silver Boot Series (thru 2026); Astros 13, Rangers 9, Ties 4 Astros 14, Rangers 12 (with tiebreakers)
Postseason games	Rangers	4‍–‍3	Rangers, 4‍–‍0	Astros, 3‍–‍0	
Regular and postseason	Astros	158‍–‍154	Astros, 81‍–‍74	Rangers, 80‍–‍77	

== Notable players who played on both teams ==
A total of 77 players have played for both franchises. But out of those 77, only 3 have played their entire careers for both teams: Chuck Jackson, Mike Richardt, and Mike Simms. Two players, Nolan Ryan and Iván Rodríguez, have been elected to the National Baseball Hall of Fame. Only six players have played for both the Rangers and Astros against their in-state opponent since 2001. Those players are: Doug Brocail, Robinson Chirinos, Richard Hidalgo, Mike Lamb, Hunter Pence, and Iván Rodríguez.

Name	Position(s)	Astros tenure	Rangers tenure
Pedro Astacio	Pitcher	2001	2005
Anthony Bass	Pitcher	2014	2015
Carlos Beltrán	Center fielder / Designated hitter	2004, 2017	2016
Lance Berkman	Outfielder / First baseman / Designated hitter	1999–2010, 2014 (Note: One Day Retirement Contract on April 5, 2014.)	2013
Doug Brocail	Pitcher	2008–2009	2004–2005
Ken Caminiti	Third baseman	1987–1994, 1999–2000	2001
Bruce Chen	Pitcher	2003	2007
Robinson Chirinos	Catcher	2019	2013–2018, 2020
Francisco Cordero	Pitcher	2012	2000–2006
Carlos Corporán	Catcher	2011–2014	2015
Carl Everett	Outfielder	1998–1999	2002–2003
Scott Feldman	Pitcher	2014–2016	2005–2012
Armando Galarraga	Pitcher	2012	2007
Carlos Gómez	Center fielder	2015–2016	2016–17
Richard Hidalgo	Outfielder	1997–2004	2005
Mike Lamb	Third baseman / First baseman	2004–2007	2000–2003
Carlos Lee	Left fielder	2007–2012	2006
Dan Miceli	Pitcher	2003–2004	2002
C. J. Nitkowski	Pitcher	1998	2002–2003
Darren Oliver	Pitcher	2004	1993–1998, 2000–2001, 2010–2011
Roy Oswalt	Pitcher	2001–2010, 2014 (Note: One Day Retirement Contract on April 5, 2014.)	2012
Carlos Peña	First baseman / Designated hitter	2013	2001, 2014
Hunter Pence	Right fielder / Designated hitter	2007–2011	2019
Jay Powell	Pitcher	1998–2001	2002–2004
Iván Rodríguez	Catcher	2009	1991–2002, 2009
Wandy Rodríguez	Pitcher	2005–2012	2015
Nolan Ryan	Pitcher	1980–1988	1989–1993
Gregg Zaun	Catcher	2002–2003	1999

== See also ==
- Governor's Cup (Texas) (NFL)
- Texas Derby (MLS)
- Mavericks–Rockets rivalry (NBA)
- Major League Baseball rivalries

== Sources ==
- The Dallas Morning News (2008). Texas Almanac 2008–2009.
- Farmer, Neal (1996). Southwest Conference's Greatest Hits.
