= Interleague play =

Regular-season baseball games between the American and National Leagues

Interleague play logo

Interleague play in Major League Baseball refers to regular-season baseball games played between an American League (AL) team and a National League (NL) team. Interleague play was first introduced during the 1997 Major League Baseball season. Before that, matchups between AL teams and NL teams occurred only during spring training, the All-Star Game, other exhibition games (such as the now defunct Hall of Fame Game in Cooperstown, New York), and World Series. Unlike modern interleague play, none of these contests, except for the World Series, counted toward official team or league records.

From 1997 to 2001, regular season interleague play occurred only on a geographical basis, with divisions in each league (the West, Central, and East) assigned to play their counterpart in the opposite league. In 2002, MLB introduced a system of rotating matchups, allowing interleague, cross-country games to occur in the regular season for the first time. In 2023, MLB began scheduling all 30 teams to play each other every year.

== History ==
=== Early discussions ===
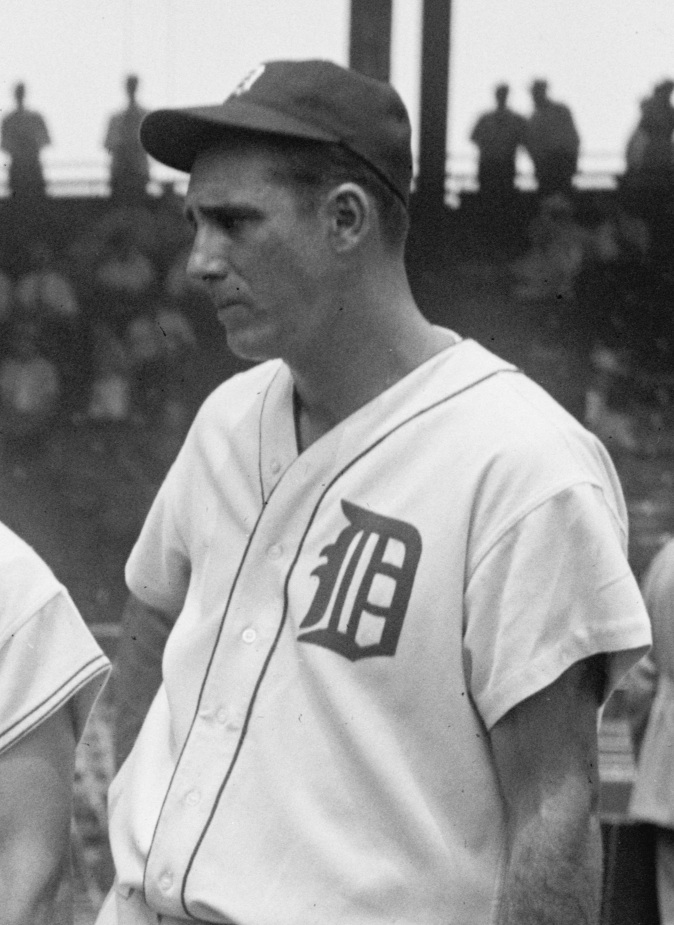
Hank Greenberg, Hall of Famer and 2-time MVP

Regular season interleague play was discussed for baseball's major leagues as early as 1903, when the two major leagues made peace and formed the National Commission as governing body. The first National Commission Chairman, Cincinnati Reds president August Herrmann (who had already been a proponent of interleague play), proposed an ambitious scheme in late 1904. Herrmann's plan would have seen the two leagues ending their seasons earlier, after approximately 116 games, "and then have every National League team play two games in every American League city, and have every American League team play two games in every National League city." Another interleague play idea was floated around the same time by Boston Americans owner John Taylor, whose plan was for each league to play its full 154-game schedule, to be followed by not just a championship series between the two league winners, but also by series between the two second-place finishers, the two third-place teams, and all other corresponding finishers.

In August 1933, several owners reacted favorably to a proposal by Chicago Cubs president William Veeck to have teams play four interleague games in the middle of the season, beginning in 1934. In December 1956, Major League owners considered a proposal by Cleveland Indians general manager and minority-owner Hank Greenberg to implement limited interleague play beginning in 1958. Under Greenberg's proposal, each team would continue to play a 154-game season, with 126 within that team's league, and 28 against the eight clubs in the other league. The interleague games would be played immediately following the All-Star Game. Notably, under Greenberg's proposal, all results would count in regular season game standings and league statistics. While this proposal was not adopted, the current system shares many elements. Bill Veeck predicted in 1963 that Major League Baseball would someday have interleague play, and in 1968 included it in a proposal for a dramatic realignment of the major league structure. (Note: Though the National League had yet to award two cities with teams for the 1969 expansion (and using correctly guessed San Diego and incorrectly guessed Dallas–Fort Worth), Bill Veeck's proposal was as follows: American League East: Baltimore Orioles, Boston Red Sox, New York Mets, New York Yankees, Philadelphia Phillies, and Washington Senators American League Midwest: Chicago Cubs, Chicago White Sox, Cleveland Indians, Detroit Tigers, Minnesota Twins, and Pittsburgh Pirates National League South: Atlanta Braves, Cincinnati Reds, Dallas–Fort Worth, Houston Astros, Kansas City Royals, and St. Louis Cardinals National League Pacific: California Angels, Los Angeles Angels, Oakland Athletics, San Diego, San Francisco Giants, and Seattle Pilots) While the concept was again considered in the 1970s, it was not formally approved until 1996, at least in part as an effort to renew the public's interest in MLB following the 1994 players' strike.

=== Interleague play introduced ===
MLB's first regular-season interleague game took place on June 12, 1997, as the Texas Rangers hosted the San Francisco Giants at The Ballpark in Arlington. There were four interleague games on the schedule that night, but the other three were played on the West Coast, so the Giants–Rangers matchup started a few hours earlier than the others. Texas's Darren Oliver threw the game's first pitch and San Francisco outfielder Glenallen Hill was the first designated hitter used in a regular-season game by a National League team. San Francisco's Darryl Hamilton got the first base hit in interleague play, while Stan Javier hit the first home run, leading the Giants to a 4–3 victory over the Rangers.

From 1997 to 2001, teams played against the same division from the other league; for example, the American League West played teams from the National League West, typically scheduled to alternate between home and away in consecutive years. In 2002, however, the league began alternating which divisions played which divisions, and thus in 2002 the American League East played the National League West, the American League Central played the National League East, and the American League West played the National League Central. Matchups which had been of particular interest prior to this format — mainly geographic rivals — were preserved. Corresponding divisions were skipped once when this rotation began, but were put back in the rotation in 2006.

From 2002 to 2012, all interleague games were played prior to the All-Star Game (with the exception of games postponed by weather that were made up after the All-Star Game). Most games were played in June and early July, although beginning in 2005, interleague games were played during one weekend in mid-May.

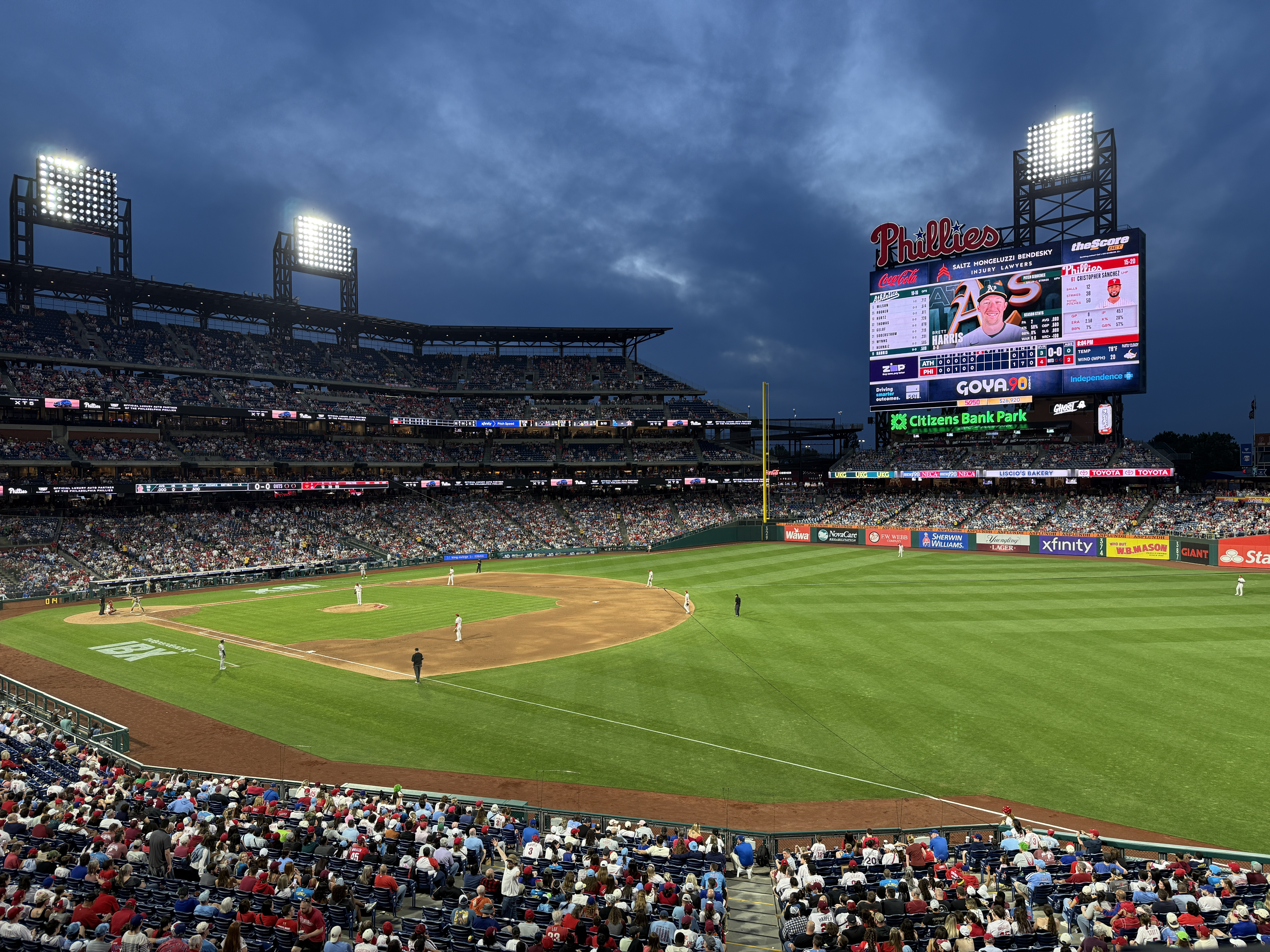
Interleague game between the Philadelphia Phillies of the NL and the Athletics of the AL on May 5, 2026

The designated hitter (DH) rule was originally applied in the same manner as in the World Series (and the All-Star Game prior to the 2010 edition). In an American League ballpark, both teams had the option to use a DH, while in a National League ballpark, both teams' pitchers were required to bat. Teams from both leagues have both benefited and have been at a disadvantage when it comes to the DH rule in interleague play. For instance, Barry Bonds, who spent his entire career in the National League and actually won eight Gold Gloves earlier in his career, was used strictly as a DH later in his career when the San Francisco Giants played away interleague games due to his poor fielding. Conversely, Boston Red Sox slugger David Ortiz, who spent his entire career in the American League and was the Red Sox's regular DH, was assigned to play first base when the Red Sox had away interleague games, with the Sox choosing to give up good fielding in favor of retaining Ortiz's power hitting. With the introduction of the DH to the National League in 2022, this no longer applies.

In 2007, two teams – the Los Angeles Dodgers and the Baltimore Orioles – played six games with more than one interleague opponent. The Dodgers played both the Toronto Blue Jays and the Los Angeles Angels while the Orioles played both the Arizona Diamondbacks and the Washington Nationals. This happened again in 2012 as the New York Yankees played both the New York Mets and the Atlanta Braves for six games. The Miami Marlins also did this, playing both the Tampa Bay Rays and Boston Red Sox for six games each.

The first Civil Rights Game was an exhibition interleague game between the Cleveland Indians and St. Louis Cardinals at AutoZone Park in Memphis on March 31, 2007. The first regular season Civil Rights Game was an interleague game between the Chicago White Sox and Cincinnati Reds at Great American Ball Park on June 20, 2009.

Since the introduction of interleague play, two teams have shifted leagues: the Milwaukee Brewers from the American League to the National League in 1998, and the Houston Astros from the National League to the American League in 2013. As a result, a 2013 interleague series between the two teams made it the first time that two teams faced each other in an interleague series after both teams previously faced each other in an interleague series representing opposite leagues: the two teams met from September 1–3, 1997 (Houston in NL, Milwaukee in AL), then again from June 18–20, 2013 (Houston in AL, Milwaukee in NL). In both instances, the series took place in Houston, with the team representing the American League winning 2–1. From 1998 to 2012, both teams were division opponents in the National League Central (which had six teams at the time, while the American League West only had four).

For the 2020 season, all interleague games featured the DH, as the National League used the rule as an experiment due to health and safety measures related to the COVID-19 pandemic. The DH became permanent in the NL for the 2022 season.

=== Series history ===
Interleague play has largely favored the American League in terms of win–loss records. In 29 years of play, the AL has won the season series 20 times, and holds the longest streak of 14 straight seasons, from 2004 through 2017. The National League has won 8 and one season ended in a tie. With the Pirates beating the Royals on September 19, 2018, the National League guaranteed a season series win for the first time since 2003.

As of the end of the 2025 MLB season, the American League holds an all-time series advantage of 4,650–4,412. The American League holds the longest streak for finishing with the better record in interleague play, at 14 straight seasons, dating back from 2004 through 2017. 2006 was the most lopsided season in interleague history, with American League teams posting a 154–98 record against their National League counterparts.

== Records ==
=== Wins by league ===
Year	Best record	Total games	American League	National League	AL winning pct.	NL winning pct.
1997	National	214	97	117	.453	.547
1998	American	224	114	110	.509	.491
1999	National	251 (Note: A game scheduled between the Milwaukee Brewers and the Minnesota Twins in Milwaukee was cancelled and not made up due to weather.)	116	135	.462	.538
2000	American	251 (Note: A game scheduled between the Florida Marlins and the New York Yankees in New York was cancelled and not made up due to weather.)	136	115	.542	.458
2001	American	252	132	120	.524	.476
2002	National	252	123	129	.488	.512
2003	National	252	115	137	.456	.544
2004	American	252	127	125	.504	.496
2005	American	252	136	116	.540	.460
2006	American	252	154	98	.611	.389
2007	American	252	137	115	.544	.456
2008	American	252	149	103	.591	.409
2009	American	252	138	114	.548	.452
2010	American	252	134	118	.532	.468
2011	American	252	131	121	.520	.480
2012	American	252	142	110	.563	.437
2013	American	300	154	146	.513	.487
2014	American	300	163	137	.543	.457
2015	American	300	167	133	.557	.443
2016	American	300	165	135	.550	.450
2017	American	300	160	140	.533	.467
2018	National	300	142	158	.473	.527
2019	National	300	134	166	.447	.553
2020	Tied	298 (Note: Two games between the St. Louis Cardinals and Detroit Tigers scheduled for Detroit were cancelled and not made up due to a COVID-19 outbreak in the Cardinals organization.)	149	149	.500	.500
2021	American	300	167	133	.557	.443
2022	American	300	152	148	.507	.493
2023	National	690	328	362	.475	.525
2024	National	690	321	369	.465	.535
2025	American	720	367	353	.510	.490
2026	National	720	336	384	.467	.533
Overall	American	9,782	4,986	4,796	.510	.490

=== Interleague statistics ===
The following is the text of Major League Baseball's policy regarding the compilation of statistics as a result of interleague play:

"For the first time in the history of Major League Baseball, Interleague games are to be played during the regular season. Breaking tradition always brings about controversy and the matter of baseball records is no exception.

"It is the opinion of Major League Baseball that there is no justification for compiling a new volume of records based on Interleague Play. On the contrary, the sovereignty of each league's records will be retained, and if a player or a team breaks a record against an Interleague opponent it will be considered a record in that league. In cases where two teams – as Interleague opponents – break a league or Major League record, that record will be annotated with the phrase 'Interleague game.' Streaks by both teams and individual will continue (or be halted) when playing Interleague opponents in the same manner as if playing against an intraleague opponent. In essence, records will be defined by who made them rather than against whom they were made."

"The official statistics of both leagues will be kept separately as they have in the past. This means statistics for each team and their individual players will reflect their performance in games within the league and also in Interleague games without differentiation."

== Geographical matchups and natural rivals ==
The 1997–2001, 2006, 2009, 2012, 2015, 2018, 2020, and 2021 seasons saw teams from corresponding leagues (AL East vs NL East, AL Central vs NL Central, and AL West vs NL West) face each other in a series of 2 or 3 games each, although from 1998 to 2012, this was not strictly followed due to unbalanced leagues. Not all matchups were considered interleague rivals, by playing a series of only two or three games, not the four or six-game series exclusive between one NL and one AL team.

Since 1999, certain interleague matchups have been highly anticipated each year, due to the geographic proximity of the teams involved. Many cities, metropolitan areas, and states contain at least one team in each league. From 1999 to 2012, and in 2015, 2018, 2020, and 2021 in which their respective divisions met, there were six games between the two teams annually, three per ballpark. In 2013–2014, 2016–2017, 2019, and 2022, there were four games between the two teams, two per ballpark, as their respective divisions did not meet. With the beginning of league-wide interleague play in 2023, all yearly matchups saw the continuation of the four-game series format for 2023 and 2024 and one three-game series against the other 14 interleague opponents, with location to alternate every year.

Starting in 2025, these matchups reverted to the six-game series format each season.

=== Permanent rivalries ===
- Athletics v. San Francisco Giants — Formerly known as the Bay Bridge Series or Battle of the Bay from 1968 to the end of 2024 when the Oakland Athletics (now relocated to West Sacramento) and the Giants were both located in the San Francisco Bay Area. The two teams played in the 1989 World Series as well as the 1905 World Series, 1911 World Series, and 1913 World Series when they were located in Philadelphia and New York, respectively. The interleague rivalry has been played yearly since it began in 1999.
- Arizona Diamondbacks v. Texas Rangers – Paired up as a result of the 2023 schedule format change after meeting as “split rivals” in 2013 and 2019. Previously played as rivals from 1998 to 2000 when the Diamondbacks were an expansion team before the Interleague Lone Star Series was founded. The two teams played in the 2023 World Series.
- Atlanta Braves v. Boston Red Sox – Paired up as a result of the 2023 schedule format change after meeting as “split rivals” in 2014, 2016, 2018, 2020, and 2022, as well as 1999 to 2002, 2007 and 2009. The Braves played in Boston as the Boston Red Stockings, Red Caps, Beaneaters, Doves, Rustlers, and Braves from 1871 through 1952.
- Baltimore Orioles v. Washington Nationals — Beltway Series, MASN Cup (the teams formerly shared the same cable partner), Battle of the Beltways, Parkway Series, or MARC Madness. Introduced in 2006, the Nationals′ second season in Washington, D.C., after their move from Montreal (where they were in a natural rivalry with the Toronto Blue Jays).
- Chicago Cubs v. Chicago White Sox — Windy City Series, Crosstown Classic, or Red Line Series. The two teams played in the 1906 World Series. The two teams would play in an exhibition series yearly from 1903 to 1942 (excluding years either team won their respective pennant). From 1985 until interleague play began in 1997, the two teams would play an annual Windy City Classic charity exhibition game. The interleague rivalry has been ongoing since 1999.
- Cincinnati Reds v. Cleveland Guardians — Ohio Cup. Wade Miley of the Reds threw a no–hitter against the then-Indians on May 7, 2021, making the Reds the first team to no–hit their interleague rival. This was the second no-hitter in an interleague game between teams from the same state, after Don Larsen's perfect game in the 1956 World Series. The two teams would play an annual pre-season exhibition game yearly from 1989 to 1996. The regular season rivalry was introduced in 1999 with a hiatus in 2002 and 2003.
- Colorado Rockies v. Houston Astros – Paired up as a result of the 2023 schedule format change after meeting as “split rivals” in 2013 and 2019. Played as division rivals in the NL West in 1993, the Rockies’ inaugural season, before the split to three divisions in 1994 moved the Astros to the newly-formed NL Central division, and played every season as interdivision opponents until the Astros joined the American League in 2013.
- Detroit Tigers v. Pittsburgh Pirates — This series only became a rivalry because the other AL and NL Central teams were already paired up; it has become popular with fans of both teams, possibly due to the rivalry between the NHL's Detroit Red Wings and Pittsburgh Penguins. The two teams have several other connections as well. The Tigers' AA Minor League affiliate, the Erie SeaWolves, located near Pittsburgh, is a former affiliate of the Pirates and has retained the logo of a wolf wearing a pirate bandanna and eye patch. Additionally, Jim Leyland, former manager of both the Pirates (1986–1996) and the Tigers (2005–2013), remains popular in Pittsburgh where he continues to reside. The two teams played in the 1909 World Series. The regular season rivalry has been ongoing since 2012 except for 2020.
- Kansas City Royals v. St. Louis Cardinals — I-70 Series or Show-Me Series and named so because the cities of Kansas City and St. Louis are both in Missouri and connected by Interstate 70. The two teams played in the 1985 World Series. Previously played as interleague rivals in 2002, 2003, and 2006 to 2009, the formal rivalry has been ongoing since 2011.
- Los Angeles Angels v. Los Angeles Dodgers — Freeway Series. The two teams played in a pre-season exhibition series in 1962 to 1964, 1969 to 1971, 1973 to 1979, and 1981 to 1996. The interleague rivalry has been ongoing since 1999.
- Miami Marlins v. Tampa Bay Rays — Citrus Series, the interleague rivalry has been ongoing since 1999 except for a formal rivalry in 2003.
- Milwaukee Brewers v. Minnesota Twins — The Twins and the Brewers were formerly regional rivals in the American League, as well as division rivals from 1970 to 1971, and again from 1994 to 1997. The two metro areas are connected by Interstate 94. However, the term "I-94 Series" is used almost exclusively to refer to the games played between the Milwaukee Brewers and the Chicago Cubs and interleague contests with the also-former-rival Chicago White Sox. The interleague rivalry has been played yearly since it began in 2002.
- New York Mets v. New York Yankees — Subway Series. The two teams would play in an in-season annual exhibition game, the Mayor's Trophy Game, 19 times between 1963 and 1983. The two teams played in the 2000 World Series. The addition of the Mets in 1962 brought National League baseball back to New York after the Dodgers and Giants moved to California in 1958. The interleague rivalry has been ongoing since 1999.
- Philadelphia Phillies v. Toronto Blue Jays – Paired up as a result of the 2023 schedule format change after meeting as “split rivals” in 2014, 2016, 2018, 2020, and 2022, as well as 2009. These two teams played in the 1993 World Series, where Joe Carter hit a walk-off home run during Game 6.
- San Diego Padres v. Seattle Mariners — The two teams were once the only west-coast teams not to be paired up with another interleague rival. The two teams share a Spring Training complex in Peoria, Arizona. Often cited as a counterargument against the "rivalry" series in general due to the teams' lack of a historical rivalry and their locations on opposite ends of the Pacific Coast (and the I-5 corridor), as well as both teams' general underachievement throughout their time as "rivals." Sometimes jokingly referred to as the Vedder Cup after Pearl Jam singer Eddie Vedder, who has lived in both cities (although Vedder himself, raised in the Chicago area, is a Chicago Cubs fan); starting in 2025, both teams partnered with Vedder to create a trophy given to the winner of their regular season series. The rivalry was introduced in 1999 and was played as a formal rivalry yearly up until 2013 except in 2002 and 2004, with the two meeting as “split rivals” in every season except 2015, 2017, 2018, and 2021, before the rivalry was reinstated as a permanent rivalry due to the 2023 schedule format change.

In 2014, the ten teams that qualified for the postseason were five pairs of geographical rivals: the Angels, Athletics, Orioles, Royals, and Tigers from the AL; and Dodgers, Giants, Nationals, Cardinals, and Pirates from the NL.

==== Split rivalries (2013–2022) ====
From 2013 to 2022, five teams in each league, two in each East division and three in each West division that had no formal rivalries formed "split rivalries." While the East divisions see rivalry pairings mostly alternate from year to year, the West divisions have so far seen four different variations of pairings between the six teams that are largely erratic. Starting in 2023, pairings of these teams formed permanent rivals.

In the East:

- 2013, 2015, 2017, 2019, and 2021:
  - Boston Red Sox v. Philadelphia Phillies
  - Toronto Blue Jays v. Atlanta Braves
- 2014, 2016, 2018, 2020, and 2022 (these pairings would later be used from 2023 onward after the scheduling format change):
  - Boston Red Sox v. Atlanta Braves
  - Toronto Blue Jays v. Philadelphia Phillies

In the West:

- 2013 and 2019 (these pairings would later be used from 2023 onward after the scheduling format change):
  - Houston Astros v. Colorado Rockies
  - Seattle Mariners v. San Diego Padres
  - Texas Rangers v. Arizona Diamondbacks
- 2014, 2016, 2020, and 2022:
  - Houston Astros v. Arizona Diamondbacks
  - Seattle Mariners v. San Diego Padres
  - Texas Rangers v. Colorado Rockies
- 2015, 2017, and 2018:
  - Houston Astros v. Arizona Diamondbacks
  - Seattle Mariners v. Colorado Rockies
  - Texas Rangers v. San Diego Padres
- 2021:
  - Houston Astros v. San Diego Padres
  - Seattle Mariners v. Arizona Diamondbacks
  - Texas Rangers v. Colorado Rockies

=== Former interleague rivalries ===
- Baltimore Orioles v. Philadelphia Phillies — Played from 1999 to 2005. In 2006, the Washington Nationals replaced the Phillies as the Orioles' rival. Although the Nationals moved to Washington in 2005, the schedule for that season was already established, so the Washington-Baltimore rivalry series could not start until the next season. Therefore, in 2005 the Orioles played the Phillies as their rival for the last time, while Washington played Montreal's planned 2005 schedule, which included what would have been the Expos's interleague rivalry games with the Toronto Blue Jays. These two teams also played against each other in the 1983 World Series.
- Houston Astros v. Texas Rangers (Lone Star Series) — Played from 2001 to 2012. In 2013, the Astros moved to the American League West, and the two teams began to play against each other 19 times a year as divisional rivals and then later reduced to 13 in 2023.
- Montreal Expos v. Toronto Blue Jays (Pearson Cup or The All-Canadian Series) — Played from 1999 to 2004 (and by Washington against Toronto in 2005). By the time the Expos moved to Washington, D.C., to become the Washington Nationals for the 2005 season, the 2005 schedule already had been set, so the Nationals played what had been intended as Montreal's rivalry series with the Blue Jays that season. In 2006, the Nationals began playing the Baltimore Orioles annually as their interleague rival.

=== Temporary interleague rivalries ===
- Over the 14 seasons of interleague rivalries when the leagues had unequal teams between 1999 and 2012, several home-and-home series only occurred once for the sake of scheduling and had no geographic basis. These would never occur again as formal interleague rivalries after leagues were balanced in 2013.
  - Detroit Tigers v. St. Louis Cardinals in 1999
  - Kansas City Royals v. Pittsburgh Pirates in 2000
  - Colorado Rockies v. Detroit Tigers in 2003
  - Arizona Diamondbacks v. Detroit Tigers in 2005
  - Los Angeles Dodgers v. Toronto Blue Jays in 2007 (in addition to the Freeway Series)
  - Boston Red Sox v. Miami Marlins in 2012 (in addition to the Citrus Series)
- In the shortened 2020 season, the Central divisions' usual rivalry matchups were altered. The Pittsburgh Pirates played six games against the Cleveland Indians and the Cincinnati Reds played six games against the Detroit Tigers instead of facing off in their usual rivalries, though the Pirates and Tigers still played a 3-game set and the Reds and Indians played a 4-game set. This was done to reduce travel in the wake of the COVID-19 pandemic.

== Scheduling ==
=== 1997–1998: Beginnings of interleague play ===
1997 was the first year of regular season interleague play. The twenty teams in the East and Central divisions played fifteen games each in five three-game series. The eight teams in the West divisions played sixteen games each in eight two-game series, playing home and away two-game series against each team.

1998 saw the addition of two expansion teams; with the Milwaukee Brewers' move to the National League, the leagues were now unequal in size. All the teams in the American League played sixteen interleague games, playing one four-game series (split into two home, two away) and four three-game series, except the five teams in the AL Central who played two two-game series and four three-game series. National League teams played between twelve and sixteen interleague games.

=== 1999–2012: Three weeks in June ===
From 1999 through 2012, each team in the American League played eighteen interleague games a year, but because the National League had two more teams than the American, only four NL teams would play a full eighteen-game interleague schedule, with the remaining twelve teams playing only fifteen; occasionally NL teams played only twelve interleague games, allowing for more teams in the league to play a full slate. With the exception of two NL teams playing each other, all teams were involved in interleague play at the same time (typically in June and July), playing only interleague opponents until the interleague schedule was complete for the year. The schedule was later changed to occur only in June; in 2005, it was changed again to allow for more weekend interleague games, with each team playing one series during the third weekend in May and the rest in mid-to-late June (occasionally stretching into early July).

Because of the existence of "natural rivals", not every matchup was played within each matched pair of divisions; for instance, the Milwaukee Brewers faced only Baltimore and Boston from the AL East in 2003, then met New York, Tampa Bay, and Toronto in 2005.

=== 2013–2022: Astros join American League ===
In 2013, the Houston Astros joined the American League, giving each league fifteen teams and thereby necessitating that interleague games be played throughout the season, including on Opening Day and during key division races all the way to the end of the season. This did not require expanding the total number of interleague games, because, previously, the interleague games made up 252/2430 (about 1 in 9.6) games. With an odd number of teams in each league, one team in each league would be the "odd man out" and have to play an interleague game to fill out the schedule, meaning as few as one in fifteen games could be interleague (fourteen AL teams in seven AL games, fourteen NL teams in seven NL games and one AL and one NL team in an interleague game). Although there were some proposals to play thirty or more interleague games per team, only a small increase was implemented in 2013.

From 2013 to 2022, each team played twenty interleague games across eight series. Each team played one three-game series against four teams from one division in the other league, and two two-game series (one home, one away) against the remaining team in that division. Divisions had been rotated since 2002 but teams did not necessarily play everyone in that division prior to 2013. The remaining four games were played against a team's "natural rival" in home and home two-game series. From 2013 to 2017, these two series were back to back at one venue on Monday and Tuesday and at the other team's venue that Wednesday and Thursday. Should a team's natural rival be a member of the division they are scheduled to play as part of the yearly rotation (this first occurred for all teams in 2015), the team would play home-and-home three-game series against the natural rival, home-and-home two-game series against two other opponents, and single three-game series against the last two (one home, one away). Because the requirement for nearly daily interleague play (the only exception being if not all teams are playing) spreads out interleague play throughout the year, not every team will be in interleague play on the same day. Due to the 2016 CBA lengthening the schedule by four days, 2018 was the first year during which no team was required to play back-to-back home-and-home two-game series against any other team.

In 2020 due to the COVID-19 pandemic the schedule was shortened from 162 games to 60 and interleague opponents were switched to the corresponding divisions. The teams played twenty interleague games using the same format that was in place in 2015 and 2018, when the same geographic divisions were aligned together for interleague play. In 2020 only, the Central's "natural rivals" were altered to include Cleveland v. Pittsburgh and Detroit v. Cincinnati instead of the usual Cleveland v. Cincinnati and Detroit v. Pittsburgh.

=== 2023–present: Expanded interleague play ===
As part of the Collective Bargaining Agreement signed in 2022, interleague play was expanded from twenty to forty-six games where each team played a three-game series against each opposite league team and a four-game (two home, two away) season series against their natural rival. In 2025 and beyond, each team will play a six-game series in a home-and-home format (three games at each team's park), against its natural rival and a single three-game series against the other fourteen interleague opponents, with the venue alternating every year. This increases the amount of interleague games per team to forty-eight and gives MLB a total of 720 interleague games a season. Teams that were part of the “split rivalry” rotation from 2013 to 2022 had permanent rivalry matchups assigned to them.

In 2025, this expanded further to forty-eight games per team as interleague rivals reverted to the six game matchups between rivals that were played from 1999 to 2012, and in 2015, 2018, 2020, and 2021, for a total of 720 interleague games per season.

Most days, there will be either one, three, or five interleague games scheduled, as an average of around 3.8 interleague games are played per day. With fifteen teams in each league, the number of interleague games is almost always odd, with exceptions based on when teams from each of the AL and NL have the same off day. Doubleheaders and make-up games also apply should a rainout or other extended delay requires one or more games to be postponed.

=== Other ===
On April 1, 2013, an interleague game was played on Opening Day for the first time, between the Los Angeles Angels of Anaheim and the Cincinnati Reds at Great American Ball Park, with the Angels winning that game, 3–1, in thirteen innings. Also, on September 29, 2013, for the first time in major league baseball history, an interleague game was played on the last day of the regular season, between the Miami Marlins and the Detroit Tigers at Marlins Park. The Marlins not only claimed the distinction of winning that game, 1–0, in walk-off fashion, but also saw their pitcher Henderson Álvarez (who was in the on-deck circle when the walk-off happened) pitch a no-hitter, marking just the seventh time a no-hitter was tossed in an interleague contest.

On April 3, 2016, for the first time in MLB history, the previous year's World Series participants faced off on Opening Day the following year. The Kansas City Royals hosted the New York Mets at Kauffman Stadium in a nationally televised game and won, 4–3.

With the Pittsburgh Pirates' victory over the Oakland Athletics on July 10, 2013, every team has beaten every other team at least once; the A's had previously been 11–0 all time against the Pirates.

Every team has also hosted and visited every other team at least once. This distinction was completed in July 2016 when the San Diego Padres made their first trip to Toronto. The two teams had previously played in San Diego in 2004, 2010, and 2013.

From 1997 to 2001, the divisions were paired with their geographical counterpart (AL East vs. NL East, AL Central vs. NL Central, AL West vs. NL West). Beginning in 2002, the divisional pairings rotated. The geographical counterparts were initially skipped in 2004, but returned to the schedule in 2006, creating a three-year rotation that remained in use for over a decade. In 2020, due to the COVID-19 pandemic, the originally scheduled matchups were adjusted in order to limit travel. Divisional pairings before 2023 were:

Season	NL East vs.	NL Central vs.	NL West vs.	AL East vs.	AL Central vs.	AL West vs.
1997, 1998, 1999, 2000, 2001, 2006, 2009, 2012, 2015, 2018, 2020, 2021	AL East	AL Central	AL West	NL East	NL Central	NL West
2002, 2004, 2007, 2010, 2013, 2016, 2019	AL Central	AL West	AL East	NL West	NL East	NL Central
2003, 2005, 2008, 2011, 2014, 2017, 2022	AL West	AL East	AL Central	NL Central	NL West	NL East

Since 2023 with the 2022 collective bargaining agreement, every team will play every other team regardless of league. The current format has a total of forty-eight interleague games per season (forty-six in 2023 and 2024), consisting of a six-game home and home series against the geographic rival (four games in 2023 and 2024) and a single three-game series against the other fourteen interleague opponents, with location to alternate every year.

== Arguments ==
Since its introduction, regular-season interleague play has continued to be a source of controversy among baseball fans and others involved with the sport. Among the arguments used in favor of and in opposition to interleague play are the following:

=== Pros ===
- Interleague play increases attendance; however, these numbers may be skewed, as interleague games were previously primarily played on weekends in June, when attendance is higher across the board, school is not in session and temperatures are higher than some of the other months of the season. However, season-long interleague play should mitigate this statistical bias.
- Fans can see players they might not otherwise get to see, especially those who have only ever played in one league.
- Certain geographic rivalries are played out during the regular season that otherwise might not happen for years at a time. The Yankees now play six games against the Mets each season, whereas they would only have gone head-to-head in the 2000 World Series if not for interleague play. From 1962 until interleague play, the Mets and the Yankees had only played each other in the Mayor's Trophy Game (held from 1963 to 1983), which was an exhibition game even though it was played during the regular season.
- It creates matchups that might not have been seen in generations. For example:
  - During the 2004 season, the Giants and Red Sox played each other for the first time since meeting in the 1912 World Series.
  - The Red Sox had never played at Wrigley Field (an NL park since 1916) until 2005. Conversely, the Chicago Cubs' trip to Fenway Park in 2011 was their first appearance there since the teams met in the 1918 World Series. The Cubs played their home games in that series in the more expansive Comiskey Park.
  - In 2004, the Yankees and Dodgers met for the first time since the 1981 World Series at Dodger Stadium. They didn't meet at the Bronx until 2013, making the Dodgers the only team to never have played a regular season game at the original Yankee Stadium.
  - In 2008, the New York Yankees visited the Pittsburgh Pirates for the first time since the 1960 World Series.
- It allows for a rematch of the previous World Series. Starting 2023, this is guaranteed to happen once per year as all 30 teams will play each other. The most notable example of this before 2023 came in 2016, when the New York Mets and Kansas City Royals, who met in the 2015 World Series, met again on Opening Day in Kansas City.
- It allows the relative strength of the two leagues to be measured against each other over a large assortment of games, rather than just in the World Series once per year.

=== Cons ===
- The World Series and All-Star Game lose the prestige that used to result from the two leagues playing completely exclusive schedules during the regular season: in the case of the World Series, the "best in the American League" playing the "best in the National League" for the only time that season.
- More games against interleague opponents means fewer games against same-league and division rivals – the latter of which may be more compelling. However, the leagues currently play an unbalanced schedule that favors divisional opponents rather than teams from other divisions (which is important due to the postseason qualifying structure – only the best team from a given division is guaranteed a berth in the postseason).
  - Starting in 2023, divisional games were reduced from 19 to 13 per season, while every team plays three games against every interleague opponent except for six against their geographic rival. These changes were intended to address strength-of-schedule disparities that could potentially skew a wild card race, with playoffs expanded to six teams per league.

=== Former cons ===
- These cons applied primarily to the 1997–2001 and/or 2002–2012 formats and not necessarily to the current format:
  - The "rivalry" series that consisted of six games a year for some teams lead to further scheduling inequities. For example, the AL West race could be skewed by Seattle getting six games per year against last-place San Diego and Oakland's six matchups against defending champion San Francisco.
  - Some teams played a certain inter-league team more than a certain intra-league team. For example, the Washington Nationals played the Baltimore Orioles (an AL team) 6 times in the 2012 season, and the San Diego Padres and Pittsburgh Pirates (NL teams) only 5 times each. This is no longer the case since 2013, when every pair of intra-league foes are guaranteed at least six meetings against each other, three at each venue.
  - Most notably, teams no longer play identical opponents as their divisional rivals, and even where they do, they don't always play them an identical number of times. This can lead to "strength of schedule" disparities like those the NFL has to deal with on a yearly basis.
    - For example, in 2005, the San Diego Padres played every AL Central team except for Kansas City, who had the worst record in the league, as well as six games against Seattle, who finished that season 69–93. Meanwhile, their division rivals, the San Francisco Giants, played every AL Central team except for the Chicago White Sox, who had the best record in the AL and went on to win the World Series, in addition to six against Oakland, who was in playoff contention for most of the season.
- These cons applied before the National League's adoption of the designated hitter rule in 2022:
  - Some argued that the AL possessed an unfair advantage over the NL because of the designated hitter rule in the AL, citing the overwhelming dominance of the AL in interleague play for more than a decade. When NL teams were on the road, they were forced to find a DH in place of their pitcher, who would normally bat ninth. Sometimes, the NL team would use one of their star hitters as the DH and use a bench player to fill in for the appointed DH, and other times, the NL team would simply use a bench player as the DH and have him bat later. In either case, however, the benefits of using a DH in place of the pitcher were minimal, especially considering that the AL designated hitters saw more action in their positions and that AL teams still possessed their full 9-man batting lineup. Even when the NL team hosted, arguments were made that there was no real benefit for the NL team either. For the most part, designated hitters are also passable fielders, meaning that they can still be used in the game. Because the AL team had to take a player out of their lineup, they had a starting player available to pinch-hit and/or come in as a substitute player later in the game, as opposed to a bench player on an NL team. And although AL pitchers saw less action than NL pitchers, stats showed that AL pitcher batting average was not much lower than NL pitcher batting average, in large part due to the fact that several AL pitchers previously played in the NL.
  - Most American League pitchers were unaccustomed to running the bases (unless they had previously played in the National League), which could lead to injury and premature fatigue. (For example, Chien-Ming Wang of the New York Yankees suffered a season-ending lisfranc sprain on his right foot when running the bases during an interleague game against the Houston Astros in 2008.)

== See also ==
- Major League Baseball rivalries
- List of Major League Baseball awards
