= Major League Baseball rivalries =

North American professional baseball

Throughout its history, Major League Baseball has featured numerous rivalries between teams and cities. These rivalries have developed for a variety of reasons, most commonly geographic proximity, frequent competition, specific incidents, cultural, linguistic, national affiliations, and division rivalry.

== Background ==
There were 8 teams in each league and teams in each league played each other 22 times a season. With the second American League incarnation of the Washington Senators (now the Texas Rangers) and the Los Angeles Angels entering play as expansion teams in 1961, MLB increased the total number of games American League teams played to 162, which meant teams would play each other 18 times a season. The National League did not implement this until the following year when the New York Mets and Houston Colt .45s (now the Houston Astros) entered play.

In 1969, with the San Diego Padres, Seattle Pilots, Kansas City Royals, and Montreal Expos entering play as expansion teams, MLB split both leagues into two divisions with six teams each. Teams played a total of 90 intra-divisional games, playing teams within the division 18 times each, and 72 inter-divisional games, playing each team in the other division 12 times. However, in 1977, the addition of the Seattle Mariners and Toronto Blue Jays reduced the number of intra-divisional games American League teams played to 78, as each team would play each team within the division 13 times. However, they still played each team in the other division 12 times, but the total number of inter-divisional games increased to 84. The National League did not institute this until 1993, when the Florida Marlins and Colorado Rockies entered play.

In 1994, MLB split each league into three divisions, but kept the 1993 format in scheduling. In 1997, with MLB adopting interleague play, the schedules were changed. The schedule for interleague play comprised 84 three-game series, namely six series (eighteen games) for each of fourteen AL teams and as many as six for each of sixteen NL teams.

MLB changed its scheduling format in 2001, further intensifying division matchups throughout the league. The new "unbalanced schedule" allowed for additional games in each season between divisional rivals, replacing additional series with teams outside the division. Due to the change, division rivals now played each other 17 or more times each season. The scheduling drew criticism both when it was enacted and after the fact, with some analysts even positing that the unbalanced schedule hurt intra-divisional play.

With the Astros moving to the American League West in 2013, MLB changed its scheduling formula as a result of each division having five teams. Teams play a total of 76 intra-divisional games, playing teams within the division 19 times each, and six or seven games against other teams in their leagues and 20 interleague games. The move of the Astros led to interleague play throughout the season. The number of interleague games against natural rivals was reduced from six to four. Beginning in 2023, intradivisional games were reduced to 13 while teams get three interleague games against each non-natural opponent and four against a natural rival.

In 2025, a new "MLB Rivalry Weekend" was revealed, with the first edition taking place in the third weekend of May. During this weekend, nearly every team plays a designated interleague rival. 11 of the 15 Rivalry Weekend matchups are interleague, with three being intradivision and one being intraleague.

== American League ==
=== American League East ===
==== Boston Red Sox vs. New York Yankees ====
The Red Sox–Yankees rivalry is one of the oldest, most famous, and fiercest rivalries in American sports. For more than 120 years, the Boston Red Sox and New York Yankees have been intense rivals.

The rivalry is often a heated subject of conversation in the Northeastern United States. Since the inception of the wild card team and an added Division Series, the AL East rivals have squared off in the American League Championship Series three times: The Yankees won in 1999 and 2003, and the Red Sox won in 2004. The two also faced off in the American League Division Series in 2018, with the Red Sox winning in four games. The teams most recently played in the 2025 American League Wild Card Series, which the Yankees won at Yankee Stadium. In addition, the teams have twice met in the last regular-season series of a season to decide the league title, in 1904 (when the Red Sox won) and 1949 (when the Yankees won).

The teams also finished tied for first in 1978, when the Yankees won a high-profile one-game playoff for the division title. The 1978 division race is memorable for the Red Sox having held a 14-game lead over the Yankees more than halfway through the season. Similarly, the 2004 ALCS is famous for the Yankees leading 3–0 and ultimately losing a best-of-7 series.

In 2019, the rivalry was showcased in the first London Series, with the Yankees winning both games.

The rivalry is often termed the "greatest rivalry in all of sports." Games between the two teams often generate a great deal of interest and get extensive media coverage, including being broadcast on national television. In the stands, it is very common for Yankees fans and Red Sox fans to taunt each other and get into fistfights, so security at both Yankee Stadium and Fenway Park is heavy when either team comes to town.

==== Boston Red Sox vs. Tampa Bay Rays ====
The Rays–Red Sox rivalry is contested between the Tampa Bay Rays and Boston Red Sox. Though this rivalry is more recent than the Red Sox–Yankees rivalry, both teams have regularly competed for the AL East title since 2008, winning it a combined seven times between 2008 and 2021. They have also met in the postseason several times, most recently in 2021. Due to this level of close competition, the rivalry has been called one of the most competitive in the modern American League.

=== American League Central ===
==== Lake Erie Series: Cleveland Guardians vs Detroit Tigers ====
The Cleveland Guardians share a rivalry with the Detroit Tigers fueled by geographic proximity between the two cities, and elements from the intense rivalry between Michigan and Ohio State. The rivalry with came to a head on August 7, 2013, with the teams first and second in the AL Central standings. Many Tigers fans who made the short trip to Cleveland started a "Let's go Tigers!" chant while the game was tied in the ninth inning. Cleveland fans countered with a "Detroit's bankrupt!" chant, in reference to the city's 2013 bankruptcy. Footage of the chants from SportsTime Ohio circulated online, with many baseball fans on social media criticizing Cleveland fans for the chant due to the circumstances of Detroit's financial situation. The Tigers ended up defeating Cleveland 6–5 in 14 innings. The two teams have played almost evenly over their 125-year history with Detroit holding a narrow 1,168–1,167 lead. The teams have met twice in the postseason, with Cleveland winning the 2024 AL Division Series and Detroit winning the 2025 AL Wild Card Series.

==== Grand Trunk Series: Detroit Tigers vs. Chicago White Sox ====
The series between the Detroit Tigers and Chicago White Sox is one of the oldest active rivalries in the Major League Baseball. Both teams joined the American League in 1901 after being charter members of the original Western League. Both have actively played one another annually for over 120 seasons. As is often the case between professional sports teams located in Chicago or Detroit, there usually exists a rivalry as such with the Bulls–Pistons rivalry of the NBA, the Blackhawks–Red Wings rivalry of the NHL, and the Bears–Lions rivalry of the NFL. Despite playing one another for over 2,200 games as of 2026, both teams have yet to meet in the postseason.

==== Route 12 Series: Minnesota Twins vs. Chicago White Sox ====
The Twins–White Sox rivalry is contested between the Minnesota Twins and Chicago White Sox. Though both teams are charter members of the American League, the rivalry did not begin in earnest until the 2000s, when the White Sox and Twins consistently battled for the AL Central crown. In the 2000s, they combined to win 8 out of the 10 AL Central division titles of the decade. Their most prominent meeting occurred in the 2008 American League Central tie-breaker game, which was necessitated by the two clubs finishing the season with identical records.

=== American League West ===
==== Lone Star Series: Texas Rangers vs. Houston Astros ====
The Silver Boot is awarded annually to the winner of the Lone Star Series

The Lone Star Series (also, Silver Boot Series) is a Major League Baseball rivalry featuring Texas' two major league franchises, the Texas Rangers and Houston Astros. It is an outgrowth of the "natural rivalry" established by MLB as part of interleague play as the Rangers are a member of the American League and the Astros were a member of the National League until 2012.

During interleague play, the winner of the 6-game series was awarded the Silver Boot. A 30-inch (760 mm) tall display of a size-15 cowboy boot cast in silver, complete with a custom, handmade spur. If the series was split (3–3), the winner was the club which scored the most runs over the course of the series.

In 2013, the Astros were forced into the American League West with the Rangers and changed their rivalry from an interleague to an intra-division rivalry, the Astros played their first game in the American League against the Rangers on Sunday Night Baseball that season. In 2015, both teams made the playoffs and were in a tight division race during most of the season.

In 2023, the Rangers and Astros qualified for the postseason, marking the first time since 2015 that both teams made the postseason. While both teams finished the regular season with identical records (90–72), the Astros had the better head-to-head record (9–4). As such, the Astros won their third consecutive division title (and sixth in seven years), whilst the Rangers were relegated to the wild card berth. The two teams had their first postseason matchup in the ALCS. With the visiting team winning every game, the Rangers won the series in seven games en route to their first World Series title, which they achieved by defeating the Arizona Diamondbacks in five games.

==== Houston Astros vs. Seattle Mariners ====
The rivalry is relatively new, as the historically National League Houston Astros only joined the American League in the 2013 season, joining the American League West, where the Seattle Mariners have played their entire franchise history since 1977. The Astros have been historically dominant against the Mariners, winning nine of their first 13 seasons of matchups (2002, 2004, 2007, 2013–2022). The Astros lead the all-time regular season series 136–104 and have a perfect 3–0 record against Seattle in the postseason.

From 2013 to 2019, the two teams were rarely in contention with each other, with one team making or coming close to making the postseason, while the other was nowhere close. Since 2020, the two teams have grown an increasingly competitive rivalry, having fought handily for control of the division or Wild Card spots, often finishing within five games of each other. The resurgence of the Mariners to playoff contention in 2022 has fueled the rivalry in competition, as difference in records since then has decreased to only three and a half games.

The 2020 season saw the Mariners finish two games behind the Astros for control of a wild card spot, while the 2021 season saw the Mariners finish five games behind the Astros for control of the division. The 2022 season saw the Mariners return to the playoffs, in a year that included multiple bench-clearing incidents between the Astros and Mariners during the regular season. The Mariners won their first postseason series since 2001 by sweeping the Toronto Blue Jays in the Wild Card Series 2–0. The Mariners and Astros faced off in the 2022 ALDS, with Houston sweeping the Mariners in three games. The third and final game of that series was among the longest in postseason history; its 18 innings matched the longest game in playoff history and its 6 hours, 22 minutes was the third-longest in time.

The Mariners finished two and three and a half games behind the Astros for control of the division in 2023 and 2024, respectively, and the Mariners were one game behind in the Wild Card in both seasons. The rivalry was a brief focus at the end of the 2025 season, after a three game sweep of the Astros in Houston by the Mariners in late September. The sweep put the Mariners 3 games up in the division with 6 to play while all but eliminating the Astros from postseason contention. Three days later, the Mariners won the AL West Division championship for the first time in 24 years.

Despite the lone 2022 playoff meeting, both teams have grown a recent history of hitting one another with pitches, and even instigating multiple brawls between players.

==== Los Angeles Angels vs. Athletics ====
The Los Angeles Angels and Athletics have held a steady rivalry since their relocation to California and to the AL West in 1969. Though not as intense as the Dodgers–Giants rivalry equivalent in the National League, the A's and Angels have often been competitive in their own battle for the division through the decades. The peak of the rivalry was during the early part of the millennium as both teams were stellar and perennial contenders. But even then, there were only two down-to-the-wire finishes between the Angels and the A's during that time. During the 2002 season; both teams were proving to be contenders as The A's famous Moneyball tactics led them to a league record 20 game win streak; knocking the Angels out of the 1st seed in the division, finishing 4 games ahead while the Angels secured the Wild Card berth. Despite the 103 win season for Oakland; they fell in an upset to the Minnesota Twins in the ALDS. The Angels managed to pull off a victory over both the New York Yankees and the Minnesota Twins and culminated in the franchise's first and only World Series victory. During the 2004 season, both teams came down to the wire: tied for wins headed into the final week of September with the last three games being played in Oakland against the Angels. Both teams were battling to secure the lowest remaining wild card spot, however; Oakland fell in 2 losses to the Angels with only one victory in the series coming in the final game. Oakland found themselves eliminated from the playoff hunt, though the Angels suffered a sweep at the hands of the eventual champion Boston Red Sox.

==== Los Angeles Angels vs. Texas Rangers ====
The Angels–Rangers rivalry has been said to have developed over a domination in the division between the two teams, and also in recent years more animosity between the two teams due to players who have played for both teams, including Nolan Ryan, Mike Napoli, Darren Oliver, Vladimir Guerrero, C. J. Wilson, and Josh Hamilton. In 2012, Wilson played a joke on Napoli, his former teammate, by tweeting his phone number, causing Napoli to exchange words with Wilson. The feuds go back to two incidents between Angels second baseman Adam Kennedy and Rangers catcher Gerald Laird which led to punches being thrown.

The Angels and Rangers have each pitched a perfect game against each other, making them the only pair of MLB teams to have done so. Mike Witt pitched a perfect game for the Angels against the Rangers in 1984 at Arlington Stadium and Kenny Rogers for the Rangers against the Angels in 1994.

=== Inter-divisional ===
==== Houston Astros vs. New York Yankees ====
While fairly recent, as the teams have rarely met historically before interleague play due to the Astros originally being in the National League, the Astros–Yankees rivalry has taken over baseball. One of their most notable historic meetings came in an exhibition game on April 9, 1965, the inaugural game played at the Astrodome and the first under the Astros team name; the Astros won the game 2–1. As with other teams, the Yankees are known for signing away several star players from the Astros, including Roger Clemens, Lance Berkman, and Gerrit Cole. The Astros are the only team to no hit the Yankees twice, with two combined no-hitters in 2003 and 2022; they are also the only team to no-hit them since 1958. Since 2015, the Astros and Yankees, along with the Boston Red Sox, also tend to have the most wins in the American League.

Since the Astros moved to the American League in 2013, the two teams have met in the postseason on four separate occasions, all of which have been won by the Astros. The first was the 2015 American League Wild Card Game, which Houston won 3–0; the second was the 2017 American League Championship Series, which Houston won in seven games; and the third was in the 2019 American League Championship Series, with the Astros winning in six games. The animosity between the two teams has only grown stronger in recent years, especially due to the revelations of the Houston Astros sign stealing scandal, with some believing that the sign stealing cost the Yankees the 2017 pennant; others, meanwhile, cite that the Yankees' poor offensive numbers meant they were likely to lose regardless. Many Yankees and their fans also accused the Astros of cheating during the 2019 ALCS; however, this was debunked by MLB. The fourth postseason meeting occurred during the 2022 American League Championship Series. Amidst chants by Yankees fans of "We Want Houston!" before the series, the Astros dominated the Yankees in a four-game sweep, becoming the first team to beat the Yankees in a postseason series four times.

==== New York Yankees vs. Cleveland Guardians ====
A long-standing rivalry between the New York Yankees and the Cleveland Guardians (formerly known as the Cleveland Indians) developed in the 1920s, when Cleveland shortstop Ray Chapman died on the field after Yankees pitcher Carl Mays hit Chapman in the head with a fastball. Cleveland would rally following the incident, winning their first World Series title in 1920, but the Yankees' subsequent dynastic run between 1921 and 1964 prevented Cleveland from attaining further success, other than another World Series title in 1948 and several winning seasons that followed. As a result, animosity ensued between the two franchises, pitting the perennially free-spending and dominant Yankees against the more conservative and underdog Indians.

George Steinbrenner would also be involved in the rivalry, in which he nearly purchased the Indians in the early 1970s; instead, he acquired majority ownership of the Yankees and led the team to seven World Series titles under his ownership. Since the advent of divisional playoffs in 1995, both teams faced off in seven postseason series, most recently in the 2024 American League Championship Series, with the Yankees winning five of the seven meetings.

==== Seattle Mariners vs. Toronto Blue Jays ====
Although the Seattle Mariners and Toronto Blue Jays are not a divisional rival, many Blue Jays fans from Western Canada travel to Seattle when the Blue Jays are the visiting team. Seattle is about a three-hour drive from Vancouver. The Seattle Times estimated that Blue Jays fans represented around 70 percent of the crowd in Safeco Field for a June 2017 weekend series. Additionally, both teams joined the league at the same time in the 1977 Major League Baseball expansion. The Mariners broke their playoff drought in Toronto in the 2022 American League Wild Card Series with a dramatic comeback in Game 2, after overcoming an 8–1 deficit, to win by a final score of 10–9. The two teams faced off again in the post-season in the 2025 American League Championship Series. Seattle took the first two games on the road in Toronto, but ultimately lost the series three games to four, with the Blue Jays winning game seven at home, highlighted by George Springer's 7th inning three-run home run that turned a 1–3 deficit into a 4–3 lead and eventual win.

== National League ==
=== National League East ===
==== Atlanta Braves vs. New York Mets ====
The Braves–Mets rivalry is a rivalry between the Atlanta Braves and New York Mets, who are both members of the National League (NL) East division. Their first major meeting was in the inaugural MLB postseason in 1969, in which the Miracle Mets swept the Braves in the first ever NLCS en route to their first World Series title. The rivalry was particularly fierce during the late 1990s and early 2000s, as both teams competed for postseason berths and, most notably, faced each other in the 1999 NLCS. The rivalry's fierceness would return during the 2022 season, when both teams competed for the NL East division title and first-round bye, with the Braves eventually coming out on top. Historically, the two teams have often been considered the best in their division.

==== Atlanta Braves vs. Philadelphia Phillies ====
The Braves–Phillies rivalry started prior to the teams becoming division mates, as the Phillies upset the Braves in the 1993 NL Championship Series, a year before the Braves moved to the NL East. While the Braves have often gotten the best of the Phillies in the regular season, the Phillies have often gotten the better in the postseason, going 3–1 against the Braves (winning in 1993, 2022, and 2023, and losing in 2026), creating a rivalry where both fanbases own bragging rights.

Throughout their rivalry since 1994, both franchises have dominated the National League East standings. The Braves won the division from 1995 to 2005, the Phillies won five straight from 2007 to 2011, and the Braves would then win six straight from 2018 to 2023. The Phillies won two consecutive NL East titles from 2024 to 2025, followed by the Braves in 2026.

The Braves currently lead the regular season series 1,339–1,216–15, but the Phillies lead the postseason series 11–6.

==== New York Mets vs. Philadelphia Phillies ====
The Mets–Phillies rivalry is a rivalry between the New York Mets and Philadelphia Phillies. Both clubs are members of MLB's National League (NL) East division. The rivalry between the two clubs is said to be among the most fiercely contested in the NL. The two NL East divisional rivals have met each other recently in playoff, division, and Wild Card races.

Aside from several brawls in the 1980s, the rivalry remained relatively low-key before the 2006 season, as the teams had seldom been equally good at the same time. A notable moment in their early meetings was Jim Bunning's perfect game on Father's Day of 1964, the first perfect game in Phillies history, which happened when the Mets were on a losing streak. The Phillies were near the bottom of the NL East when the Mets won the 1969 World Series and the National League pennant in 1973, while the Mets did not enjoy success in the late 1970s when the Phillies won three straight division championships. Although both teams each won a World Series in the 1980s, the Mets were not serious contenders in the Phillies' playoff years (1980, 1981, and 1983), nor did the Phillies seriously contend in the Mets' playoff years (1986 and 1988). The Mets were the Majors' worst team when the Phillies won the NL pennant in 1993, and the Phillies did not post a winning record in either of the Mets' wild-card-winning seasons of 1999 or 2000, when the Mets faced the New York Yankees in the 2000 World Series.

As the rivalry has intensified in recent years, the teams have battled more often for playoff position. The Mets won the division in 2006, while the Phillies won five consecutive division titles from 2007 to 2011. The Phillies' 2007 championship was notable given they won it on the last day of the season as the Mets lost a seven-game lead with 17 games remaining. The Phillies broke the Curse of Billy Penn to win the 2008 World Series, while the Mets' last title came in the 1986 World Series.

In 2015, the Mets won the National League Championship Series for their fifth pennant while the Phillies entered a rebuild phase. The Mets beat the Phillies 14 times and lost 5 for a lopsided season series. The season still provided contentious moments such as, Mets pitcher Matt Harvey drilling Phillies 2nd baseman Chase Utley in retaliation for Mets players getting hit by Phillies pitchers, a benches clearing argument between Phillies coach Larry Bowa in regards to a quick pitch by Hansel Robles and a bat flip by Daniel Murphy.

The first postseason meeting between the Phillies and Mets occurred in 2024, with the Mets defeating the Phillies in the NLDS in four games.

There is a long-standing rivalry between sports fans from New York City and Philadelphia, which are approximately two hours apart by car, seen also between the New York Giants and the Philadelphia Eagles in the National Football League, and the New York Rangers and the Philadelphia Flyers in National Hockey League. Games between the two teams at Citi Field and Citizens Bank Park are often intense, as each home crowd attempts to create an unfriendly, sometimes volatile atmosphere for any visiting-team fans.

==== I-95 Series: Washington Nationals vs. Philadelphia Phillies ====
The rivalry between the Washington Nationals and Philadelphia Phillies extends back to the Nationals' original tenure as the Montreal Expos. Previously the Expos–Phillies rivalry, the two teams repeatedly battled for control of the division in the early 1980s and mid 1990s. Following the franchise's relocation to Washington DC in 2005; the rivalry increased in geographic tension due to Washington's proximity to Philadelphia. The rivalry quickly spiked in intensity during the 2010s after Nationals team management introduced a campaign to block Phillies fans from overtaking home games. In 2019; star-outfielder Bryce Harper further fueled tensions after signing a 13-year $330 million contract with the Phillies as a free agent. The Nationals later won the 2019 World Series during the first year of Harper's absence. The Phillies currently lead the overall series 514–465–2, but the Nationals lead the postseason series: The Expos defeated the Phillies 3–2 in the 1981 NLDS.

=== National League Central ===
==== I-94 Series: Chicago Cubs vs. Milwaukee Brewers ====
The Brewers–Cubs rivalry (also known as the I-94 rivalry because the clubs' ballparks are connected by an 83.3-mile drive along Interstate 94) refers to games between the Milwaukee Brewers and Chicago Cubs. The rivalry started with the Milwaukee Braves and Chicago Cubs after the Braves moved from Boston to Milwaukee in the 1953 season and died when the Braves left for Atlanta in 1966. That rivalry was followed by a 1969–97 rivalry between the Brewers, then in the American League, and the Chicago White Sox. The proximity of the two cities and the Bears-Packers football rivalry helped make the Cubs–Brewers rivalry one of baseball's best. In the 2018 season, the teams faced off in a Game 163 for the NL Central division title, which Milwaukee won 3 to 1. Milwaukee also won the two teams' only postseason match-up in the 2025 NLDS.

==== Suds Series: Milwaukee Brewers vs. St. Louis Cardinals ====
The Brewers–Cardinals rivalry was born prior to both teams being in the National League Central division, as the 1982 World Series featured the Cardinals defeating the Brewers in seven-games. However, it became a more intense rivalry when the Brewers moved from the American League to the National League in 1998. Since the Brewers' rise as consistent contenders in the late 2000s, both teams have often fought challenging for the NL Central and wild card playoff spots. The rivalry peaked in 2011, which saw the second Brewers-Cardinals playoff match-up, with the Cardinals defeating the Brewers in six games, on their way to winning the 2011 World Series.

In addition, a historical undercurrent involves the competing commercial beer brands (Miller Brewing for Milwaukee, Budweiser for St. Louis). Due to the rivalry between beer brands, this series has often been referred as the "Suds Series".

==== I-55 Series: Chicago Cubs vs. St. Louis Cardinals ====
The Cardinals–Cubs rivalry (also called the Route 66 rivalry and The I-55 rivalry) refers to games between the St. Louis Cardinals and Chicago Cubs. The Cubs lead the series 1,091–1,044 through 2010, while the Cardinals lead in National League pennants with 19 against 17 for the Cubs. However, the Cardinals have a clear edge when it comes to World Series successes, having won 11 championships (most recently in 2011), while the Cubs have only won 3 (last winning in 2016). Cardinals–Cubs games see numerous visiting fans in either St. Louis' Busch Stadium or Chicago's Wrigley Field. When the National League split into two, and then three divisions, the Cardinals and Cubs remained together. They had 3 pennant races in 1930, 1935, and 1945. The two teams met in the World Series of the nineteenth century when the Cardinals, then known as the Browns, were part of the American Association. The teams tied in 1885 and St. Louis won in 1886. St. Louis, however, has officially vacated their history from the AA. The first modern postseason meeting between the two teams was the 2015 NLDS, which the Cubs won 3 games to 1 before losing the 2015 NLCS to the New York Mets.

==== Pittsburgh Pirates vs. Cincinnati Reds ====
The Pirates–Reds rivalry is a historic series between the Pittsburgh Pirates and the Cincinnati Reds. At one point in time was one of the fiercest matchups in the National League during the 1970s; both teams often met in the postseason multiple times prior to both being realigned to the National League Central in 1994. The two teams date far into the infancy of MLB, having both been founded in the 1880s, and first met during the 1900 MLB season. Both teams combine for 10 World Series championships and 18 pennants. The Pirates and Reds met 5 times during the NLCS in 1970, 1972, 1975, 1979, and 1990. Most recently; both teams met again during the 2013 NL Wild Card Game.

=== National League West ===
==== Los Angeles Dodgers vs. San Francisco Giants ====
The Dodgers–Giants rivalry is one of the oldest, fiercest, and most competitive rivalries in professional sports. It began in the late 19th century when both clubs were based in New York City, with the Dodgers playing at Ebbets Field in Brooklyn and the Giants at the Polo Grounds in Manhattan. After the 1957 season, Dodgers owner Walter O'Malley decided to move the team to Los Angeles for financial reasons, among others. Along the way, he managed to convince Giants owner Horace Stoneham (who was considering moving his team to Minnesota) to preserve the rivalry by bringing his team to California as well. New York baseball fans were stunned and heartbroken by the move. Given that the cities of Los Angeles and San Francisco have long been competitors in economic, cultural, and political arenas, the new venue in California became fertile ground for its transplantation.

Each team's ability to have endured for over a century while leaping across an entire continent, as well as the rivalry's growth in intensity from a cross-city to a cross-state engagement, have led to the rivalry being considered one of the greatest in sports history.

Unlike many other historic baseball match-ups in which one team remains dominant for most of their history, the Dodgers–Giants rivalry has exhibited a persistent balance in the respective successes of the two teams, and remains immensely fierce today. As of the conclusion of the 2024 season, the teams have faced each other 2,585 times since 1889 (including playoffs), with the Giants leading the all-time series by just four games (1,286 to 1,282 with 17 ties). The Giants have won eight titles compared to nine by the Dodgers, and the teams rank first and second all-time in National League pennants (26 for the Dodgers and 23 for the Giants). Across all of Major League Baseball, the two franchises have more wins all-time than any other teams (Giants ranked first, Dodgers second).

Since moving to California, the Dodgers hold the edge in pennants (14–6) and World Series titles (8–3). For all their history, the 2021 NLDS marked the first time the two teams had ever played each other in the postseason, with Los Angeles beating San Francisco in a winner-takes-all Game 5.

==== I-5 Series: Los Angeles Dodgers vs. San Diego Padres ====
The Dodgers–Padres rivalry is occasionally called the I-5 rivalry, as Southern California's two largest cities of Los Angeles and San Diego are located approximately 130 miles apart along Interstate 5.

For much of the teams' history, matchups had often been lopsided in favor of the Dodgers: Los Angeles leads the all-time series with a .551 winning percentage. However, since 2020 both franchises have fielded several highly competitive teams simultaneously, resulting in five playoff appearances for Los Angeles and three for San Diego. The two teams faced each other in the Division Series three times during the 2020s: Los Angeles won in 2020 and 2024, while San Diego won in 2022. The recent shared competitiveness and high-stakes playoff matchups have added intensity to a growing rivalry in Southern California. Off the field, the rivalry has been just as competitive, as the two teams have aggressively battled on the trade market and free agency over star players, such as Juan Soto, Mookie Betts, Max Scherzer, and Trea Turner. Some high-profile stars have also played for both teams in recent years, including Blake Snell, Yu Darvish and Manny Machado.

Beyond baseball, San Diego sports fans have often harbored animosity towards Los Angeles due in small part to San Diego being an unstable home for their sports teams as both the Chargers and the Clippers both relocated to Los Angeles after being unable to find a secure future in San Diego.

==== Arizona Diamondbacks vs. Los Angeles Dodgers ====
The Diamondbacks-Dodgers rivalry developed due to proximity when the Diamondbacks entered the league in 1998, as Chase Field and Dodger Stadium are only 375 miles apart along Interstate 10. It peaked and became one of the fiercest divisional matchups for several years in the 2010s. During the 2010s, animosity rose immensely between both sides. An infamous example occurred on September 19, 2013. After eliminating the Diamondbacks from postseason contention and clinching their division, multiple Dodgers players celebrated the win by jumping into the pool at Arizona's Chase Field. The two sides met during the 2017 National League Division Series, where the Dodgers swept the Diamondbacks en route to an appearance in the World Series. The teams matched up again in the 2023 National League Division Series, in which the Diamondbacks returned the favor with a 3–0 sweep of their own en route to a World Series appearance, their first since 2001. The Dodgers lead the all-time series and there is a 3–3 split in the postseason.

Due to not having a team until 1998, many Arizona residents supported the Dodgers prior to the creation of the Diamondbacks franchise. Because of this, there is often a split crowd when they play Los Angeles at their home park, Chase Field.

==== Arizona Diamondbacks vs. Colorado Rockies ====
The Diamondbacks developed an on-and-off rivalry with the Colorado Rockies, often attributed to both teams being the newest in the division. Colorado had joined the NL West in 1993, while the Diamondbacks are the newest team in the league, joining in 1998. The two teams have met twice in the postseason; notably during the 2007 National League Championship Series, which saw the Rockies enter the postseason as a wild card and go on to upset the division champion Diamondbacks in a sweep en route to the franchise's lone World Series appearance. The two teams met again in the 2017 National League Wild Card Game, which Arizona won. The Diamondbacks currently lead the overall series 275–216, but the Rockies lead the postseason series 4–1.

=== Inter-Divisional ===
==== Keystone Series: Philadelphia Phillies vs. Pittsburgh Pirates ====
The rivalry between the Philadelphia Phillies and Pittsburgh Pirates was considered by some to be one of the best rivalries in the NL. The rivalry started when the Pittsburgh Pirates entered play in 1887, four years after the Phillies.

The Phillies and Pirates remained together after the National League split into two divisions in 1969. During the period of two-division play (1969–1993), the two National League East division rivals won the two highest numbers of division championships, the Pirates 9, the Phillies 6; together, the two teams' 15 championships accounted for more than half of the 25 NL East championships during that span.

However, after the Pirates moved to the National League Central in 1994, the rivalry ended. The teams have since faced each other only in two series per year and the rivalry has effectively died in the years since the Pirates moved out of the NL East. However, many fans, especially older ones, retain their dislike for the other team and regional differences between Eastern and Western Pennsylvania still fuel the rivalry. The rivalry is mirrored in the National Hockey League's so-called "Battle of Pennsylvania".

==== St. Louis Cardinals vs. Los Angeles Dodgers ====
Both the Cardinals and Dodgers are two of the oldest franchises in MLB, having first met during the 1900 season during the league's infancy; the Cardinals in 1882 and the Dodgers (originally known as the Bridegrooms) in 1883. Historically; both teams have not played in the same division; however frequent close pennant races and matchups in the postseason caused the rivalry to grow in intensity through the decades. This was on display from 1963 to 1968 when either team represented the National League in the World Series, or from 2004 to 2021, when the two teams met in the postseason five times.

==== St. Louis Cardinals vs San Francisco Giants ====
The St. Louis Cardinals and San Francisco Giants share a storied MLB rivalry built on intense National League competition from as early as the 1930s. Throughout the 1960s, both franchises battled atop of the National League standings with World Series trip at stake. More recently, they have battled in multiple high-stakes postseason matchups, including the 1987, 2002, 2012, and 2014 NLCS. The Giants hold the edge with a 1091–993–9 all-time regular-season record against the Cardinals through the end of the 2025 season. The Giants also lead the all-time playoff record against the Cardinals at 15–9; they have won their last three playoff series versus St. Louis.

== Interleague ==
=== Background ===
==== Early discussions about interleague play ====
Interleague or interconference matchups have long been the norm in other professional sports leagues such as the National Football League. Regular-season interleague play was discussed for baseball's major leagues as early as the 1930s. In December 1956, Major League owners considered a proposal by Cleveland general manager and minority-owner Hank Greenberg to implement limited interleague play beginning in 1958.

Under Greenberg's proposal, each team would continue to play 154-games in the season, 126 of which would be within the league, and 28 against the 8 clubs in the other league. The interleague games would all be played during a period immediately following the All-Star Game. Notably, under Greenberg's proposal, all results would count in regular season game standings and league statistics. While this proposal was not adopted, the current system shares many elements. Bill Veeck predicted in 1963 that Major League Baseball would someday have interleague play. The concept did not take hold until the 1990s (at least in part as an effort to renew the public's interest in MLB following the 1994 players' strike).

==== First Interleague games ====
MLB's first regular season interleague game took place on June 12, 1997, when the Texas Rangers hosted the San Francisco Giants at Rangers Ballpark in Arlington. There were four interleague games on the schedule that night, but the other three were played on the West Coast, so the Giants–Rangers matchup started a few hours earlier than the others. Texas' Darren Oliver threw the game's first pitch and San Francisco outfielder Glenallen Hill was the first designated hitter used in a regular-season game by a National League team. San Francisco's Stan Javier hit the first home run in interleague play, and the Giants won the game 4–3.

For the first five seasons of Interleague Play, each division played against the same division from the other league (NL East vs. AL East, NL Central vs. AL Central and NL West vs. AL West), typically scheduled to alternate between home and away in consecutive years. However, in 2002, a new format to Interleague Play was instituted where teams play Interleague games against various divisions. Matchups which had been of particular interest prior to this format—mainly geographic rivals—were preserved. This is expected to be the continuing format of the interleague schedule. Corresponding divisions however, were skipped once when this rotation began, but were put back in the rotation in 2006.

From 2002 to 2012, all interleague games were played prior to the All-Star Game. Most games were played in June, though May games have been scheduled since 2005. Among the 224 interleague pairs of teams, 11 played six games every year, which were scheduled in two three-game series "home and home", or one at each home ballpark. Five of these matches feature two teams in the same city or in neighboring cities, where they wholly or partly share territorial rights. Six are regional matches at greater distance, four of which are in the same state.

Since 2023, MLB went to a schedule that saw every team play each other at least once in a season.

=== East ===
==== Battle of the Beltways: Baltimore Orioles vs. Washington Nationals ====
Known as the Beltway Battle and as the Battle of the Beltways, after Washington's Capital Beltway (I-95/I-495) and Baltimore's Baltimore Beltway (I-695). The two teams first met in 2006, one year after the Montreal Expos relocated from Montreal to Washington, D.C., to become the Washington Nationals. Much of this rivalry is dominated by off-the field issues. Baltimore owner Peter Angelos publicly opposed relocating the Expos to Washington, which he believed was a part of his territorial rights after the departure of the second incarnation of the Washington Senators after the 1971 season. There are also controversies surrounding the value of the Nationals' television rights and their coverage on the Mid-Atlantic Sports Network.

==== Subway Series: New York Mets vs. New York Yankees ====
The Mets–Yankees rivalry is the latest incarnation of the Subway Series, the competition between New York City's Major League Baseball teams, the AL Yankees and NL Mets. Until interleague play started, the two teams had only met in exhibition games. Since the inception of interleague play the teams have met in every season since 1997 and faced off in the 2000 World Series with the Yankees winning in five games.

==== Citrus Series: Miami Marlins vs. Tampa Bay Rays ====
The Citrus Series is the name given to the interleague series between the Miami Marlins and Tampa Bay Rays in Major League Baseball. The Marlins entered the league in 1993 as the Florida Marlins, while the Rays had their first season in 1998 as the Tampa Bay Devil Rays. The first meeting between the two teams took place on June 22, 1998, at Tropicana Field in St. Petersburg, Florida during the Rays' inaugural season. The Marlins moved into Marlins Park in the 2012 season; from 1998 to 2011, the games were played at the NFL's Miami Dolphins' Hard Rock Stadium (as it is currently named), though it has been known by several names in its existence.

=== Central ===
==== Border Battle: Milwaukee Brewers vs. Minnesota Twins ====
The Border Battle is an annual interleague rivalry between the Milwaukee Brewers (NL-Central) and the Minnesota Twins (AL-Central). The rivalry started and was most heated when the Brewers were still in the American League before transitioning to the National League.

==== Crosstown Classic: Chicago White Sox vs. Chicago Cubs ====
The Cubs–White Sox rivalry (also known as the Wintrust Crosstown Cup, Crosstown Classic, The Windy City Showdown, Red Line Series, City Series, Crosstown Series, Crosstown Cup, or Crosstown Showdown) refers to the rivalry between two Major League Baseball teams that play their home games in Chicago, Illinois. The Chicago Cubs of the NL play their home games at Wrigley Field located on the city's North side, while the Chicago White Sox of the AL play their home games at Rate Field on the city's South side. The terms "North Siders" and "South Siders" are synonymous with the respective teams and their fans, setting up an enduring rivalry. The Chicago Transit Authority's Red Line runs north–south through Chicago's neighborhoods, stopping at Wrigley Field on Addison Street and Rate Field on 35th Street.

Notably this rivalry actually predates the Interleague Play Era, with the only postseason meeting occurring in the 1906 World Series. It was the first World Series between teams from the same city. The White Sox won the series 4 games to 2, over the highly favored Cubs who had won a record 116 games during the regular season. The rivalry continued through of exhibition games, culminating in the Crosstown Classic from 1985 to 1995, in which the White Sox were undefeated at 10–0–2.

==== Ohio Cup: Cincinnati Reds vs. Cleveland Guardians ====
The Ohio Cup is between the National League (NL)'s Cincinnati Reds and the American League (AL)'s Cleveland Guardians. Both teams' cities are about 250 miles away via I-71. As of the 2025 season the Guardians lead the regular-season series 77–64.

==== I-70 Series: St. Louis Cardinals vs. Kansas City Royals ====
The rivalry between the St. Louis Cardinals of the National League and Kansas City Royals of the American League is a Major League Baseball series sometimes known as the I-70 Series or the Show-Me Series. This rivalry is so called because the two cities are located in the state of Missouri, whose nickname is the "Show Me State", and both cities are located along Interstate 70. They played each other for the first time in the 1985 World Series, which saw the Royals overcome a 2–0 and 3–1 series deficit to win in seven games. Owing to their geographical proximity, the teams face each other at home and away every regular season in interleague play.

This prominent rivalry began with Royals successes in the early 1980s, fueled by the Royals' victory over the Cardinals in the 1985 World Series. The series is still a source of contention among fans, notably the controversial call in the bottom of the ninth of game 6 in which Royal Jorge Orta was called safe on a play that replays later showed him out; a Royals rally let them tie, and later win, the game and then the series.

=== West ===
==== Freeway Series: Los Angeles Angels vs. Los Angeles Dodgers ====
The term Freeway Series refers to a series of baseball games played between Major League Baseball's Los Angeles Angels of the American League and Los Angeles Dodgers of the National League. The series takes its name from the massive freeway system in the greater Los Angeles metropolitan area, the home of both teams; one could travel from one team's stadium to the other simply by traveling along Interstate 5. The Freeway series is extremely popular in Los Angeles and normally sells out their games due to the close proximity of both teams and their fans. The closest the two teams came to playing in a World Series together was in 2009, when they both made their respective league championship series before losing. Another recent point of contention between the two fanbases occurred on December 9, 2023, when Angels’ star Shohei Ohtani signed with the Dodgers for $700 million. Ohtani's decision to leave the Angels to sign with the Dodgers led to some Angels fans dubbing him a "traitor" and "sell-out". Although the Dodgers have been the more historically successful franchise, the Angels hold a slight edge in the head-to-head advantage in meetings between the two teams.

==== Houston Astros vs. Los Angeles Dodgers ====
The series between the Houston Astros and the Los Angeles Dodgers started as a divisional matchup, but hostility waned following Houston's move from the NL West to the NL Central in 1994, and later move to the American League in 2013. In 2017, the two teams played one another in the 2017 World Series in which the Astros won the championship in 7 games. The rivalry re-intensified after the Astros' sign stealing scandal, in which it was revealed the team had utilized a complex system to steal pitch signs during the 2017 season, which culminated with them winning the World Series. As a result of the scandal, hostility grew immensely between the two teams and their fans. The 2017 World Series was also the start of an era defined by these two franchises. All but one World Series from 2017 through 2025 featured either the Astros or Dodgers, with the Astros making four appearances and the Dodgers appearing in five. In the same period, the Astros won the 2022 World Series and the aforementioned 2017, while the Dodgers won in 2020, 2024 and 2025.

==== Bay Bridge Series: Athletics vs. San Francisco Giants ====
The Athletics-Giants rivalry started as the Bay Bridge Series, the name of the games played between—and rivalry of—the Oakland Athletics of the AL and San Francisco Giants of the NL, whilst the Athletics were still located in Oakland. The series took its name from the San Francisco–Oakland Bay Bridge which links the cities of Oakland and San Francisco. Although competitive, the rivalry between the A's and Giants was considered more friendly, with mostly mutual companionship between the fans, as opposed to the Chicago series (Cubs–White Sox), or the New York series (Mets–Yankees), where animosity runs high.

The series was also occasionally referred to as the "BART Series" for the Bay Area Rapid Transit system that links Oakland to San Francisco. However, the name "BART Series" has never been popular beyond a small selection of history books and national broadcasters and has fallen out of favor. Bay Area locals almost exclusively referred to the rivalry as the "Bay Bridge Series".

Originally, the term described a series of exhibition games played between the two clubs after the conclusion of spring training, immediately prior to the start of the regular season. It was first used to refer to the 1989 World Series in which the Athletics won their most recent championship and the first time both teams had met since they moved to the San Francisco Bay Area. The moniker stuck to games played between the teams during the regular season since the commencement of interleague play in 1997 until the Athletics moved out of Oakland after the 2024 season. During the Athletics' temporary relocation to West Sacramento, the rivalry has shifted from an inter-city (Bay Bridge Series) to a regional one, as the Giants and Athletics are the only two MLB teams located in Northern California.

==== Vedder Cup: San Diego Padres vs. Seattle Mariners ====
An unlikely matchup between two interleague opponents; the San Diego Padres and Seattle Mariners. The rivalry has been a part of local hometown lore; often called the Eddie Vedder Cup in regard to both Seattle and San Diego being hometowns for Pearl Jam frontman Eddie Vedder, who lived in San Diego County during the latter half of his adolescence before forming Pearl Jam in Seattle. Vedder himself is a fan of the Chicago Cubs.

The two teams have met each other every season excluding 2017 since interleague play was introduced in 1997. Following the introduction of interleague play; one of the 15 naturalized rivalries designated were to include Seattle and San Diego. The rivalry often involved both teams in the depths of playoff failure as the Padres failed to win a single playoff series from 1999 to 2019, while the Mariners had failed to make a single playoff appearance from 2002 to 2021; thus forcing both teams to compete for draft picks and prospects as they also share the Peoria Sports Complex as their spring training facility. Though very little on the surface initially linked any animosity between the two teams as they play in separate leagues and both cities lie approximately 1,250 miles apart. The rivalry often exists with more respect between the two teams and fans alike as more of a humorous contest for both sides.

Starting in 2025, the winner of the annual series will receive the Vedder Cup, a 1963 Fender Telecaster designed by Vedder.

=== Inter-regional ===
==== Brooklyn/Los Angeles Dodgers vs. New York Yankees ====
The Dodgers–Yankees rivalry is one of the most well-known rivalries in Major League Baseball. The strength of the rivalry has its foundation in the record twelve World Series matchups between the franchises, the teams' shared home of New York during the first half of the 20th century, and the present-day cultural rivalry between the cities of New York and Los Angeles.

The city of New York was home to both franchises from the time of the Yankees' inception in the early 20th century. For close to fifty years, the teams represented different boroughs and different leagues: the Yankees in the Bronx as a member of the American League and the Dodgers in Brooklyn as a member of the National League. The neighboring teams finally met in the World Series in 1941, resulting in a Yankees victory. The teams would ultimately face off in the World Series seven times in a 16-year span from 1941 to 1956, with the Yankees dominating; it wasn't until the sixth meeting in 1955 that the Dodgers finally broke through for their first-ever championship.

In 1958, the Dodgers moved across the country from New York to Los Angeles. The move has added a new element of competitiveness to the rivalry, as the teams now represent the two dominant media markets and cultural capitals on each coast of the United States, and since the 1980s, the two largest cities in the United States. Since the Dodgers' move, the teams have faced each other five more times in the World Series, with more even results: the Los Angeles Dodgers have won three of five matchups, including the most recent in 2024.

== Historical ==
=== American League ===
==== Highway 401 Series: Toronto Blue Jays vs. Detroit Tigers ====
The Detroit Tigers and the Toronto Blue Jays are geographic and traditional rivals, dating back to the 1980s, when the teams were AL East contenders. The Tigers moved to the AL Central in 1998, and the rivalry has died down as a result, with the teams facing each other only six to seven times per year since 2011. Depending on traffic and border delays, Detroit is about a four-hour drive from Toronto via Highway 401. According to The Detroit News, a July 2017 three-game series at Comerica Park against the Blue Jays drew a season-best-to-date total attendance of 115,088.

==== The Original I-94 Series: Milwaukee Brewers vs. Chicago White Sox ====
The Milwaukee Brewers and Chicago White Sox were considered natural rivalries due to the close-proximity and rivalry in the National Football League between the Green Bay Packers and Chicago Bears. Despite the two cities being right next to one another, the two teams played in different divisions (AL West for the White Sox, AL East for the Brewers). During the Brewers stay in the American League, both teams were rarely good at the same time. The rivalry was most intense in the 80s and 90s, highlighted by managers Phil Garner and Terry Bevington tangling match turning into a full on brawl in 1995. The rivalry ended when the Brewers moved to the National League in 1998, with both teams now bonding over a shared hatred of the Chicago Cubs.

==== Kansas City Royals vs. New York Yankees ====
Despite never playing in the same division, the Kansas City Royals and New York Yankees developed quite a disdain for each other from mid 70s through the mid 80s. Starting in 1976, they met in the American League Championship Series for four out of the five seasons (1976-1978 and 1980), with the Yankees winning the first three, and Kansas City sweeping New York in 1980. The rivalry continued in 1983, which featured the Pine Tar Game, in which Billy Martin requested that the umpires inspect George Brett's bat after he hit a two-run home run in the top of the ninth that gave Kansas City a 4–3 advantage. The umpires ruled that the amount of pine tar on the bat exceeded the amount allowed by rule, nullified Brett's home run, and called him out. As Brett was the third out in the ninth inning with the home team in the lead, the game ended with a Yankees win. The Royals protested the game, and American League president Lee MacPhail upheld their protest. MacPhail ordered that the game be continued from the point of Brett's home run. The game was resumed 25 days later on August 18, and officially ended with the Royals winning 5–4. The rivalry died when many of the main characters retired or moved to other teams via free agency (a new concept at the start of the rivalry in 1976). The Royals also went on a long rebuild after team owner Ewing Kauffman died in 1993. From 2000 to 2010, Kansas City did not win a single series against New York. The teams met in the 2024 American League Division Series, which the Yankees won 3–1.

=== National League ===
==== Brooklyn/Los Angeles Dodgers vs. Philadelphia Phillies ====
The Brooklyn–Philadelphia rivalry was based on proximity, with less than 100 miles separating the two cities. For much of their early history, both teams struggled, as they were the last two original National League teams to win a World Series (1955 for Brooklyn and 1980 for Philadelphia). The rivalry turned ugly, when in 1947, the Philadelphia Phillies and their manager, Ben Chapman, subjected Jackie Robinson, the first black player in MLB history, to severe racial abuse and taunting when the Brooklyn Dodgers visited Philadelphia in April of his first season. On the field, 1950 featured drama which found the Phillies clinging to a one-game lead over the Dodgers on the last day of the season at Ebbets Field. The Phillies won the game and clinched the 1950 National League pennant, winning on Dick Sisler's three-run home run in the 10th inning. The rivalry temporarily moved to Jersey City when the Dodgers played games there in 1956–1957 as means to put pressure on the city of Brooklyn to build the team a stadium; the first game at Roosevelt Stadium saw the Dodgers defeat the Phillies, 5–4, and the Phillies were the only team to play the Dodgers there more than once. Ultimately, this stunt proved to be futile as both the Dodgers and Giants relocated to the west coast in 1958 season. The Phillies later developed a rivalry with the expansion National League New York team, the Mets.

The rivalry turned into a playoff rivalry when the Dodgers moved to Los Angeles and when divisions were formed in 1969. Since their relocation, they have met the Phillies in October six times, with each team winning three apiece.

==== Chicago Cubs vs. New York Giants ====
The rivalry between the New York Giants and Chicago Cubs in the early 20th century was regarded as the first true rivalry in Major League Baseball, with Merkle's Boner leading to a 1908 season-ending matchup in New York of particular note. Until 1932, there were nine first-second finishes, eight second-third finishes, and 30 out of a possible 65 championships in the league's first six decades before both franchises experienced mediocrity in the 1940s. That historical rivalry was revisited when the Giants beat the Cubs in the 1989 National League Championship Series, in their tiebreaker game in Chicago at the end of the 1998 season, on June 6, 2012, in a "Turn Back The Century" game in which both teams wore replica 1912 uniforms, and in the 2016 National League Division Series in which the Cubs won.

==== Cincinnati Reds vs. Los Angeles Dodgers ====
The Dodgers–Reds rivalry was one of the most intense during the 1970s through the early 1990s. They often competed for the NL West division title. From 1970 to 1990, they had eleven 1–2 finishes in the standings, with seven of them being within 5½ games or fewer. Both teams also played in numerous championships during this span, combining to win 10 NL Pennants and 5 World Series titles from 1970–1990, most notably as the Big Red Machine teams clashed frequently with the Tommy Lasorda-era Dodgers teams. Reds manager Sparky Anderson once said, "I don't think there's a rivalry like ours in either league. The Giants are supposed to be the Dodgers' natural rivals, but I don't think the feeling is there anymore. It's not there the way it is with us and the Dodgers." The rivalry ended when division realignment moved the Reds to the NL Central. However, they did face one another in the 1995 NLDS and 2025 NLWCS.

==== Montreal Expos vs. Philadelphia Phillies ====
The Montreal Expos and Philadelphia Phillies were originally rivals as charter members of the NL East following the 1969 expansion in which the Expos were one of four new teams added to the league. The two teams grew a history of fights and pitches repeatedly tossed at one another, culminating in both teams regularly battling for control of the division during much of the early 1980s and mid 1990s. Notable games such as Mike Schmidt's game-winning home run helped Philadelphia clinch the division during their penultimate game against the Expos during the tail end of the 1980 season. The Expos responded the following season by beating the Phillies in the NLDS 3–2. The rivalry regrew following the Expos' relocation to Washington DC in 2005 to become the Nationals franchise.

==== St. Louis Cardinals vs. New York Mets ====
The rivalry between the St. Louis Cardinals and the New York Mets peaked during the 1980s when both teams contended for National League East supremacy. The rivalry began with the 1983 trade that brought Keith Hernandez from the Cardinals to the Mets, essentially turning the latter into contenders. Between 1985 and 1988, the division was dominated by either of the two teams, and in three of those years, the NL East winner went on to the World Series. In 1994, the Cardinals were moved to the National League Central, and the rivalry faded soon after. The two teams would meet in the 2000 and 2006 National League Championship Series, briefly rekindling the rivalry.

=== Interleague ===
==== Boston City / Heritage Series: Boston Braves vs. Boston Red Sox ====
The Braves and Red Sox rivalry existed due to both teams sharing the city of Boston. The rival did not have a geographical fan divide like with the Chicago or New York city rivalries from this era. Despite being the older franchise by just over 30 years, the Braves had a much harder time than the Red Sox at keeping a fanbase. Both teams experienced winning in the 1910s (the Red Sox won World Series in 1912, 1913, 1915, and 1916, while the Braves won in 1914). However, both teams saw their fortunes dip around the same time, at the end of the 1910s through the 1930s. The Braves dip was much worse than the Sox, as they could not take advantage of the calamitous decision of Red Sox's owner Harry Frazee selling off the Babe Ruth to the Yankees. The Braves bottomed out at 38–115 in 1935 (coincidentally, Ruth played on this Braves team before retiring on June 1 of that year).

The two teams played a postseason City Championship Series that took place in October of both 1905 and 1907, and resumed in 1925 until 1952 before the start of each season. In 1948, the teams had a brawl in their annual pre-season match-up, which was also the year they nearly met in the World Series. The rivalry died when the Braves left for Milwaukee in 1953. They have since relocated to Atlanta in 1966, the city they still call home to this day. Despite that, as of the 2023, the two franchises are declared natural rivals owing to the historic heritage of the two franchises prior to 1952.

==== Boston Red Sox vs. St. Louis Cardinals ====
This rivalry was mainly played out in the World Series, in which the two teams met four times and split two series. The Cardinals won the first two meetings; in 1946, St. Louis prevailed in large part to Enos Slaughter's mad dash late in Game 7, and in 1967, pitcher Bob Gibson outlasted Red Sox ace Jim Lonborg in Game 7 to dash Boston's "Impossible Dream" season. The Red Sox then won the next two meetings; in 2004, Boston ended their 86-year title drought with a four-game sweep, and in 2013, they won their third World Series in a ten-year span with a six-game win, capped off by winning the championship at Fenway Park for the first time since 1918.

==== New York Yankees vs. New York/San Francisco Giants ====
The rivalry between the New York Giants and New York Yankees was briefly intense during the 1920s as both teams not only inhabited New York City but also, for a time, the same ballpark. During that era the opportunities for them to meet could only have been in a World Series. Both teams kicked off the first Subway Series between the NL and AL in 1921. The teams met once since the Giants moved to California, in the 1962 World Series, with the Yankees winning in seven. Following the World Series matchup, the rivalry has cooled off greatly in the years afterwards.

==== Pearson Cup Series: Toronto Blue Jays vs. Montreal Expos ====
Being the only two Canadian baseball teams in the major leagues, a rivalry between the Toronto Blue Jays and the Montreal Expos was inevitable. This rivalry was assisted by the presence of the Pearson Cup, an award that was given to the winner of a special midseason match (later incorporated into the MLB interleague schedule). However, this rivalry was subdued, as the two teams played in different leagues. In 2004, the rivalry came to an end when the Expos moved to Washington to become the Washington Nationals.

With the end of the rivalry between the Blue Jays and the Expos in Montreal at the conclusion of the 2004 season, the Blue Jays won the series 24–19; the two teams never met in the postseason.

==== Philadelphia City Series: Philadelphia Phillies vs. Philadelphia Athletics ====
The rivalry between the Philadelphia Phillies and Philadelphia Athletics, also known as the Philadelphia City Series, was at its most intense from 1901 to 1955, when the Athletics played in Philadelphia. The rivalry was significant not only because both teams played in Philadelphia, but because of the strong competition between the National and American Leagues. The competition between the leagues was so strong that the A's and Phillies did not play at all from 1901 to 1902 because of legal warring between the two parties. Related to growing tensions between the rival leagues, superstar Nap Lajoie had played for several years on the Phillies, but was displeased with the salary cap of $2,400 placed by the National League. When the American League was formed in 1901 and the A's joined it, Lajoie was offered a contract by Frank Hough of the Athletics on behalf of A's manager Connie Mack. When asked by a reporter what motivated him to leave, he responded "[Frank] Hough offered me $24,000 ($682,656 in current dollar terms) for four years. You can bet I signed in a hurry!" As a result, the Phillies filed a lawsuit to the Pennsylvania Supreme Court banning Lajoie from playing for any professional team. However, the decree only applied to teams in Pennsylvania, so Lajoie signed with the Cleveland Bronchos. When the decree expired, the Phillies chose not to file it again, and Lajoie left Cleveland to sign with the A's.

When the National League and American League merged in 1903, the rivalry became more friendly. Games between the two teams were played in many stadiums throughout Philadelphia as older ones fell into disrepair and newer ones were built. Stadiums included Shibe Park, Philadelphia Park, as well as others. The final City Series game was played in 1954. In 1955, the Athletics moved to Kansas City after another dismal season in Philadelphia. The rivalry continued in spring training games until the Athletics moved to their permanent spring training facility in Mesa, Arizona. The rivalry has effectively died since then.

==== Trolley Car Series: St. Louis Browns vs. St. Louis Cardinals ====
The St. Louis Browns–Cardinals rivalry was a unique, often lopsided, crosstown battle in St. Louis that peaked with the "Trolley Car Series" in 1944 World Series, with that nickname due to no travel being necessary as the whole series was played at Sportsman's Park. The National League Cardinals (dominant and successful) overshadowed the American League Browns (often struggling), creating a David vs. Goliath dynamic before the Browns moved to Baltimore in 1953.

== See also ==
- Major League Soccer rivalries
- National Basketball Association rivalries
- National Football League rivalries
- National Hockey League rivalries
