= 2015–16 Union Dutchwomen ice hockey season =

2015–16 Union Dutchwomen women's ice hockey season
- Conference: ECAC Hockey
- Home ice: Achilles Center

Record
- Overall: 0–28–6
- Home: 0–15–0
- Road: 0–13–6

Coaches and captains
- Head coach: Claudia Asano-Barcomb
- Assistant coaches: Ali Boe; Chris Cobb
- Captain(s): Alli Devins; Jessica Kaminsky; Elizabeth Otten; Kathryn Tomaselli

The Union Dutchwomen represented Union College in ECAC women's ice hockey during the 2015–16 NCAA Division I women's ice hockey season.

== Recruiting ==
Player	Position	Nationality	Notes
Melissa Black	Goaltender	Canada	Member of Aurora Jr. Panthers
Arianna Kosakowski	Defense	United States	Played for Assabet Valley
Kelli Mackey	Forward/Defense	United States	Played with the Team Pittsburgh U19
Leah Patrick	Goaltender	United States	Attended Hill-Murray HS
Jacyn Reeves	Forward/Defense	United States	Played on Team Wisconsin with Sloan Sullivan
Sloan Sullivan	Defense	United States	Blueliner with Team Wisconsin

== 2015–16 Dutchwomen ==
No.	Nat.	Player	Class	Pos	Height	DoB	Hometown	Previous team
1		Leah Patrick	Freshman	G	5' 6" (1.68 m)		Hudson, Wisconsin	Hill-Murray HS
2		Jacyn Reeves	Freshman	F/D	5' 8" (1.73 m)		Holmen, Wisconsin	Team Wisconsin
3		Courtney Turner	Senior	F	5' 3" (1.6 m)		Milton, Massachusetts	East Coast Wizards
4		Brandy Streeter	Sophomore	D	5' 2" (1.57 m)		Morrisville, New York	Buffalo Bison
5		Elizabeth Otten (C)	Senior	D	5' 7" (1.7 m)		Edina, Minnesota	Edina HS
6		Eastyn Yuen	Junior	F	5' 3" (1.6 m)		Winnipeg, Manitoba	Shaftesbury Prep
7		Jessica Kaminsky (C)	Senior	F	5' 6" (1.68 m)		Winnipeg, Manitoba	Pembina Valley Hawks
9		Ali Devins (C)	Junior	F	5' 5" (1.65 m)		White River Junction, Vermont	Westminster School
10		Nicole Russell	Sophomore	F	5' 1" (1.55 m)		Livonia, Michigan	Honeybaked
13		Arianna Kosakowski	Freshman	D	5' 8" (1.73 m)		Ashburnham, Massachusetts	Assabet Valley
16		Erica Kelly	Sophomore	F	5' 4" (1.63 m)		Buckingham, Quebec	Kings-Edgehill School
17		Jamie Smith	Senior	F	5' 5" (1.65 m)		Stamford, Connecticut	Mid-Fairfield
18		Caitlyn McLaren	Sophomore	D	5' 8" (1.73 m)		Metcalfe, Ontario	Ottawa Lady Senators
19		Katie Laughlin	Sophomore	F	5' 9" (1.75 m)		Natick, Massachusetts	Assabet Valley
20		Kathryn Davis	Junior	D	5' 7" (1.7 m)		Milton, Massachusetts	Lawrence Academy
21		Kelli Mackey	Freshman	F/D	5' 7" (1.7 m)		Sewickley, Pennsylvania	Team Pittsburgh U19
22		Emily Erickson	Junior	F	5' 4" (1.63 m)		Crosslake, Minnesota	North American Hockey Academy
24		Hannah Erickson	Sophomore	F	5' 1" (1.55 m)		Crosslake, Minnesota	Achiever Academy
27		Kathryn Tomaselli (C)	Senior	F	5' 7" (1.7 m)		Cape Coral, Florida	Williston-Northampton
30		Melissa Black	Freshman	G	5' 5" (1.65 m)		Newmarket, Ontario	Aurora Jr. Panthers

== 2015–16 Schedule ==
Despite a largely frustrating season, the Dutchwomen remained competitive in many of their ECAC games, proving to be tough opposition to teams such as Colgate, Cornell and Yale, and never surrendered more than 4 goals to a team that was not nationally ranked.

Date	Opponent^{#}	Rank^{#}	Site	Decision	Result	Record
Regular Season
September 25	at Minnesota State*		All Seasons Arena • Mankato, MN	Melissa Black	T 2–2 ^{OT}	0–0–1
September 26	at Minnesota State*		All Seasons Arena • Mankato, MN	Leah Patrick	L 0–3	0–1–1
October 3	at Connecticut*		Freitas Ice Forum • Storrs, CT	Melissa Black	T 2–2	0–1–2
October 17	at Penn State*		Pegula Ice Arena • University Park, PA	Melissa Black	L 0–3	0–2–2
October 18	at Penn State*		Pegula Ice Arena • University Park, PA	Leah Patrick	L 0–3	0–3–2
October 23	RIT*		Achilles Center • Schenectady, NY	Melissa Black	L 1–3	0–4–2
October 24	RIT*		Achilles Center • Schenectady, NY	Melissa Black	L 1–2	0–5–2
October 30	at Colgate		Starr Rink • Hamilton, NY	Melissa Black	T 2–2 ^{OT}	0–5–3 (0–0–1)
October 31	at Cornell		Lynah Rink • Ithaca, NY	Melissa Black	T 2–2 ^{OT}	0–5–4 (0–0–2)
November 6	#4 Clarkson		Achilles Center • Schenectady, NY	Melissa Black	L 0–6	0–6–4 (0–1–2)
November 7	St. Lawrence		Achilles Center • Schenectady, NY	Melissa Black	L 1–2	0–7–4 (0–2–2)
November 13	at #9 Harvard		Bright-Landry Hockey Center • Allston, MA	Leah Patrick	L 0–5	0–8–4 (0–3–2)
November 14	at Dartmouth		Thompson Arena • Hanover, NH	Melissa Black	L 0–2	0–9–4 (0–4–2)
December 1	at Providence*		Schneider Arena • Providence, RI	Melissa Black	L 1–4	0–10–4
December 4	Brown		Achilles Center • Schenectady, NY	Melissa Black	L 0–2	0–11–4 (0–5–2)
December 5	Yale		Achilles Center • Schenectady, NY	Melissa Black	L 1–2 ^{OT}	0–12–4 (0–6–2)
December 11	at Maine*		Alfond Arena • Orono, ME	Melissa Black	L 0–1	0–13–4
December 12	at Maine*		Alfond Arena • Orono, ME	Melissa Black	T 2–2	0–13–5
January 6, 2016	Vermont*		Achilles Center • Schenectady, NY	Melissa Black	L 2–4	0–14–5
January 8	Princeton		Achilles Center • Schenectady, NY	Melissa Black	L 0–5	0–15–5 (0–7–2)
January 9	#4 Quinnipiac		Achilles Center • Schenectady, NY	Melissa Black	L 0–5	0–16–5 (0–8–2)
January 12	Syracuse*		Achilles Center • Schenectady, NY	Melissa Black	L 0–4	0–17–5
January 15	at Rensselaer		Houston Field House • Troy, NY	Leah Patrick	L 0–2	0–18–5 (0–9–2)
January 16	Rensselaer		Achilles Center • Schenectady, NY	Melissa Black	L 0–3	0–19–5 (0–10–2)
January 22	at Yale		Ingalls Rink • New Haven, CT	Melissa Black	L 1–2	0–20–5 (0–11–2)
January 23	at Brown		Meehan Auditorium • Providence, RI	Melissa Black	T 2–2 ^{OT}	0–20–6 (0–11–3)
January 29	Cornell		Achilles Center • Schenectady, NY	Melissa Black	L 1–3	0–21–6 (0–12–3)
January 30	#10 Colgate		Achilles Center • Schenectady, NY	Melissa Black	L 0–1	0–22–6 (0–13–3)
February 5	at St. Lawrence		Appleton Arena • Canton, NY	Melissa Black	L 0–2	0–23–6 (0–14–3)
February 6	at #5 Clarkson		Cheel Arena • Potsdam, NY	Melissa Black	L 1–4	0–24–6 (0–15–3)
February 12	Dartmouth		Achilles Center • Schenectady, NY	Melissa Black	L 1–3	0–25–6 (0–16–3)
February 13	Harvard		Achilles Center • Schenectady, NY	Melissa Black	L 0–3	0–26–6 (0–17–3)
February 19	at #4 Quinnipiac		TD Bank Sports Center • Hamden, CT	Melissa Black	L 0–9	0–27–6 (0–18–3)
February 20	at #8 Princeton		Hobey Baker Memorial Rink • Princeton, NJ	Melissa Black	L 2–4	0–28–6 (0–19–3)
*Non-conference game. ^{#}Rankings from USCHO.com Poll.
