= 2015–16 St. Lawrence Saints women's ice hockey season =

- Conference: 6th ECAC Hockey
- Home ice: Appleton Arena

Record
- Overall: 17-15-6
- Home: 9-6-4
- Road: 8-9-2

Coaches and captains
- Head coach: Chris Wells
- Assistant coaches: Ted Wisner; Mare MacDougall Bari
- Captain: Amanda Boulier

The St. Lawrence Saints represented St. Lawrence University in ECAC women's ice hockey during the 2015–16 NCAA Division I women's ice hockey season. The Saints upset Princeton in the ECAC Quarterfinals.

== Recruiting ==
Player	Position	Nationality	Notes
Allison Compeau	Goaltender	United States	Played for North Country Ice Storm
Nadine Edney	Forward	Canada	All-Star with Team Ontario Red
Amanda McClure	Defense	Canada	Played for Cambridge Jr. Rivulettes
Lydia Grauer	Forward	United States	Competed with Anaheim Lady Ducks
Grace Harrison	Goaltender	New Zealand	Member of Team New Zealand U18
Kayla Nielson	Forward	United States	Played with Grauer on Anaheim Lady Ducks
Justine Reyes	Forward	United States	Third Recruit from Anaheim Lady Ducks
Sonjia Shelly	Goaltender	United States	Member of the Chicago Fury

== 2015–16 Saints ==
No.	Nat.	Player	Class	Pos	Height	DoB	Hometown	Previous team
1		Brooke Wolejko	Sophomore	G	5' 8" (1.73 m)		South Windsor, Connecticut	Assabet Valley
3		Nadine Edney	Freshman	F	5' 3" (1.6 m)		Mississauga, Ontario	Mississauga Jr. Chiefs
4		Jenna Marks	Senior	D	5' 4" (1.63 m)		Madison, Wisconsin	Shattuck-St. Mary's
5		Kirsten Padalis	Junior	D	5' 7" (1.7 m)		Farmington, Michigan	Honeybaked
6		Michelle Alonardo	Sophomore	F	5' 6" (1.68 m)		Wilmington, Massachusetts	Governor's Academy
7		Alex Moore	Junior	F	5' 11" (1.8 m)		Napanee, Ontario	Team Ontario
8		Amanda Boulier (C)	Senior (RS)	D	5' 11" (1.8 m)		Watertown, Connecticut	Westminster School
9		Abbey McRae	Senior	F	5' 7" (1.7 m)		London, Ontario	London Jr. Devilettes
10		Hannah Miller	Sophomore	F	5' 9" (1.75 m)		North Vancouver, British Columbia	Okanagan Hockey Academy
11		Justine Reyes (A)	Freshman	F	5' 8" (1.73 m)		Chino Hills, California	Anaheim Lady Ducks
12		Dominique Korakianitis	Senior	D	5' 5" (1.65 m)		London, Ontario	Bluewater Jr. Hawks
14		Sydney Bell	Senior	F	5' 7" (1.7 m)		Cincinnati, Ohio	Pittsburgh Jr. Penguins
16		Kennedy Marchment	Sophomore	F	5' 8" (1.73 m)		Courtice, Ontario	Team Ontario Blue
17		Lydia Grauer	Freshman	F	5' 8" (1.73 m)		Mukilteo, Washington	Anaheim Lady Ducks
18		Megan Armstrong	Senior	D	5' 7" (1.7 m)		Edina, Minnesota	New Hampshire
20		Kayla Nielson	Freshman	F	5' 10" (1.78 m)		Laguna Hills, California	Anaheim Lady Ducks
21		Amanda McClure	Sophomore	D	5' 7" (1.7 m)		Stratford, Ontario	Cambridge Jr. Rivulettes
22		Kailee Heidersbach	Senior	F	5' 5" (1.65 m)		Park Ridge, Illinois	Chicago Mission
25		Victoria Leimgardt	Senior	D	5' 10" (1.78 m)		Stayner, Ontario	Mississauga Jr. Chiefs
26		Brooke Webster	Junior	F	5' 5" (1.65 m)		Aurora, Ontario	Team Ontario
28		Allison Compeau	Freshman	G	5' 5" (1.65 m)		Potsdam, New York	North Country Ice Storm
29		Grace Harrison	Freshman	G	5' 9" (1.75 m)		Auckland, New Zealand	Ontario Hockey Academy
31		Sonjia Shelly	Freshman	G	5' 6" (1.68 m)		Braceville, Illinois	Chicago Fury
33		Mikaela Thompson	Senior	G	5' 3" (1.6 m)		Webster, New York	Rochester Edge

== Schedule ==
=== 2015-16 Saints ===
Date	Opponent^{#}	Rank^{#}	Site	Decision	Result	Record
Regular Season
September 26	Northeastern*		Appleton Arena • Canton, NY	Sonjia Shelly	T 2–2 ^{OT}	0–0–1
September 27	Northeastern*		Appleton Arena • Canton, NY	Brooke Wolejko	L 5–9	0–1–1
October 2	at #5 Clarkson*		Cheel Arena • Potsdam, NY	Sonjia Shelly	L 0–4	0–2–1
October 3	#5 Clarkson*		Appleton Arena • Canton, NY	Sonjia Shelly	L 0–4	0–3–1
October 11	at #2 Boston College*		Kelley Rink • Chestnut Hill, MA	Sonjia Shelly	L 4–7	0–4–1
October 12	at #2 Boston College*		Kelley Rink • Chestnut Hill, MA	Grace Harrison	L 3–7	0–5–1
October 15	at Vermont*		Gutterson Fieldhouse • Burlington, VT	Brooke Wolejko	W 4–0	1–5–1
October 16	Vermont*		Appleton Arena • Canton, NY	Sonjia Shelly	W 3–2	2–5–1
October 24	Syracuse*		Appleton Arena • Canton, NY	Brooke Wolejko	W 3–2	3–5–1
October 30	at #10 Dartmouth		Thompson Arena • Hanover, NH	Sonjia Shelly	W 4–2	4–5–1 (1–0–0)
October 31	at #8 Harvard		Bright-Landry Hockey Center • Allston, MA	Sonjia Shelly	L 2–3	4–6–1 (1–1–0)
November 6	at Rensselaer		Houston Field House • Troy, NY	Sonjia Shelly	W 2–0	5–6–1 (2–1–0)
November 7	at Union		Achilles Center • Schenectady, NY	Brooke Wolejko	W 2–1	6–6–1 (3–1–0)
November 20	#10 Princeton		Appleton Arena • Canton, NY	Sonjia Shelly	W 3–2	7–6–1 (4–1–0)
November 21	#8 Quinnipiac		Appleton Arena • Canton, NY	Sonjia Shelly	L 0–5	7–7–1 (4–2–0)
November 23	Penn State*		Appleton Arena • Canton, NY	Brooke Wolejko	W 3–2	8–7–1
November 24	Penn State*		Appleton Arena • Canton, NY	Grace Harrison	W 4–2	9–7–1
December 4	Cornell		Appleton Arena • Canton, NY	Sonjia Shelly	L 3–4	9–8–1 (4–3–0)
December 5	Colgate		Appleton Arena • Canton, NY	Brooke Wolejko	L 1–2	9–9–1 (4–4–0)
January 6, 2016	Merrimack*		Appleton Arena • Canton, NY	Grace Harrison	W 6–2	10–9–1
January 8	at Brown		Meehan Auditorium • Providence, RI	Brooke Wolejko	W 2–1	11–9–1 (5–4–0)
January 9	at Yale		Ingalls Rink • New Haven, CT	Brooke Wolejko	L 2–5	11–10–1 (5–5–0)
January 15	#8 Harvard		Appleton Arena • Canton, NY	Grace Harrison	W 2–0	12–10–1 (6–5–0)
January 16	Dartmouth		Appleton Arena • Canton, NY	Grace Harrison	T 2–2 ^{OT}	12–10–2 (6–5–1)
January 22	at #10 Colgate		Starr Rink • Hamilton, NY	Grace Harrison	T 1–1 ^{OT}	12–10–3 (6–5–2)
January 23	at Cornell		Lynah Rink • Ithaca, NY	Grace Harrison	W 5–1	13–10–3 (7–5–2)
January 28	#5 Clarkson		Appleton Arena • Canton, NY	Grace Harrison	L 1–6	13–11–3 (7–6–2)
January 30	at #5 Clarkson		Cheel Arena • Potsdam, NY	Grace Harrison	T 2–2 ^{OT}	13–11–4 (7–6–3)
February 5	Union		Appleton Arena • Canton, NY	Grace Harrison	W 2–0	14–11–4 (8–6–3)
February 6	Rensselaer		Appleton Arena • Canton, NY	Grace Harrison	T 1–1 ^{OT}	14–11–5 (8–6–4)
February 12	at #4 Quinnipiac		TD Bank Sports Center • Hamden, CT	Grace Harrison	L 0–3	14–12–5 (8–7–4)
February 13	at #8 Princeton		Hobey Baker Memorial Rink • Princeton, NJ	Grace Harrison	L 3–4 ^{OT}	14–13–5 (8–8–4)
February 19	Yale		Appleton Arena • Canton, NY	Grace Harrison	T 2–2 ^{OT}	14–13–6 (8–8–5)
February 20	Brown		Appleton Arena • Canton, NY	Grace Harrison	W 3–0	15–13–6 (9–8–5)
ECAC Tournament
February 26	at #8 Princeton*		Hobey Baker Memorial Rink • Princeton, NJ (Quarterfinals, Game 1)	Grace Harrison	W 1–0	16–13–6
February 27	at #8 Princeton*		Hobey Baker Memorial Rink • Princeton, NJ (Quarterfinals, Game 2)	Grace Harrison	L 3–4	16–14–6
February 28	at #8 Princeton*		Hobey Baker Memorial Rink • Princeton, NJ (Quarterfinals, Game 3)	Grace Harrison	W 4–3 ^{OT}	17–14–6
March 5	at #4 Quinnipiac*		TD Bank Sports Center • Hamden, CT (Semifinal Game)	Grace Harrison	L 1–2	17–15–6
*Non-conference game. ^{#}Rankings from USCHO.com Poll.

== Awards and honors ==
- ECAC Team Sportsmanship Award
- Amanda Boulier, D, All-ECAC Second Team
