= 2015–16 RPI Engineers women's ice hockey season =

2015–16 Rensselaer Engineers women's ice hockey season
- Conference: 8th ECAC Hockey
- Home ice: Houston Field House

Record
- Overall: 10-17-7
- Home: 5-9-3
- Road: 5-8-4

Coaches and captains
- Head coach: John Burke
- Assistant coaches: Jake Anderson; Robert Cathcart; Christie Cicero
- Captain(s): Jenn Godin; Alexa Gruschow; Mari Mankey

The Rensselaer Engineers represented Rensselaer Polytechnic Institute in ECAC women's ice hockey during the 2014–15 NCAA Division I women's ice hockey season. The Engineers had their best season since 2010.

== Offseason ==
- October 1:Jordan Smelker ('14) was named a member of Team USA for the 4 Nations Cup, heldfrom November 4 to 8 in Sundsvall, Sweden.

=== Recruiting ===
Player	Position	Nationality	Notes
Kira Bombay	Goaltender	Canada	Minded the Net for Nepean Jr. Wildcats
Jaimie Grigsby	Forward	Canada	Played for the Whitby Wolves
Josefine Hansen	Defense	Denmark	Attended Shattuck-St. Mary's
Ana Orzechowski	Defense	United States	Blueliner for Pittsburgh Pens Elite
Taylor Schwalbe	Forward	United States	Attended Shattuck-St. Mary's
Lovisa Selander	Goaltender	Sweden	Goalie with SDE Riksserien
Makenna Thomas	Forward	United States	Played with Chicago Young Americans
Aly Tremblay	Forward	United States	Played with Minnesota Revolution

== 2015–16 Engineers ==
No.	Nat.	Player	Class	Pos	Height	DoB	Hometown	Previous team
1		Sarah Till	Senior	G	5' 10" (1.78 m)		Jericho, Vermont	Rice Academy
6		Jaimie Grigsby	Freshman	F	5' 9" (1.75 m)		Whitby, Ontario	Whitby Jr. Wolves
9		Josefine Hansen	Freshman	D	5' 4" (1.63 m)		Copenhagen, Denmark	Shattuck-St. Mary's
10		Lauren Wash	Senior	F	5' 4" (1.63 m)		Belle Meade, New Jersey	New Jersey Rockets
11		Alexa Gruschow (C)	Senior	F	5' 6" (1.68 m)		Mechanicsburg, Pennsylvania	Washington Pride
12		Jenn Godin (C)	Senior	F	5' 5" (1.65 m)		New London, New Hampshire	Tabor Academy
13		Ana Orzechowski	Freshman	D	5' 6" (1.68 m)		Tonawanda, New York	Pittsburgh Pens Elite
14		Shayna Tomlinson	Sophomore	F	5' 6" (1.68 m)		Gilford, New Hampshire	Assabet Valley
15		Laura Horwood	Junior	F	5' 6" (1.68 m)		Belleville, Ontario	Durham West Lightning
16		Mari Mankey (C)	Senior	F	5' 2" (1.57 m)		Hopkins, Minnesota	Hopkins HS
17		Hannah Behounek	Junior	D	5' 7" (1.7 m)		Minnetonka, Minnesota	Minnetonka HS
18		Makenna Thomas	Freshman	F	5' 8" (1.73 m)		Hartland, Wisconsin	Chicago Young Americans
19		Marisa Raspa	Sophomore	F	5' 3" (1.6 m)		Downingtown, Pennsylvania	North American Hockey Academy
20		Amanda Kimmerle	Sophomore	D	5' 9" (1.75 m)		Anoka, Minnesota	Anoka HS
21		Katie Rooney	Junior	F	5' 7" (1.7 m)		Buffalo, Minnesota	Buffalo HS
23		Taylor Schwalbe	Freshman	F	5' 6" (1.68 m)		Anchorage, Alaska	Shattuck-St. Mary's
24		Brandi Banks	Senior	D	5' 6" (1.68 m)		Burlington, Ontario	Stoney Creek Sabres
25		Whitney Renn	Sophomore	F	5' 6" (1.68 m)		Troy, Michigan	Detroit Little Caesars
26		Lindsey Hylwa	Junior	F	5' 8" (1.73 m)		Cary, North Carolina	Gilmore Academy
28		Aly Tremblay	Freshman	F	5' 7" (1.7 m)		Hayward, Wisconsin	Minnesota Revolution
33		Kira Bombay	Freshman	G	5' 7" (1.7 m)		Orleans, Ontario	Nepean Jr. Wildcats
35		Lovisa Selander	Freshman	G	5' 11" (1.8 m)		Sollentuna, Sweden	SDE Riksserien

== Schedule ==
Date	Opponent^{#}	Rank^{#}	Site	Decision	Result	Record
Regular Season
October 2	#6 North Dakota*		Houston Field House • Troy, NY	Lovisa Selander	L 3–4	0–1–0
October 3	#6 North Dakota*		Houston Field House • Troy, NY	Lovisa Selander	L 1–4	0–2–0
October 9	at RIT*		Gene Polisseni Center • Rochester, NY	Lovisa Selander	W 6–2	1–2–0
October 10	at RIT*		Gene Polisseni Center • Rochester, NY	Sarah Till	W 3–1	2–2–0
October 16	Robert Morris*		Houston Field House • Troy, NY	Lovisa Selander	L 0–2	2–3–0
October 17	Robert Morris*		Houston Field House • Troy, NY	Sarah Till	L 1–3	2–4–0
October 30	at Cornell		Lynah Rink • Ithaca, NY	Lovisa Selander	W 2–1 ^{OT}	3–4–0 (1–0–0)
October 31	at Colgate		Starr Rink • Hamilton, NY	Lovisa Selander	T 3–3 ^{OT}	3–4–1 (1–0–1)
November 6	St. Lawrence		Houston Field House • Troy, NY	Lovisa Selander	L 0–2	3–5–1 (1–1–1)
November 7	#4 Clarkson		Houston Field House • Troy, NY	Lovisa Selander	W 2–1	4–5–1 (2–1–1)
November 13	at Dartmouth		Thompson Arena • Hanover, NH	Lovisa Selander	L 0–4	4–6–1 (2–2–1)
November 14	at #9 Harvard		Bright-Landry Hockey Center • Allston, MA	Lovisa Selander	L 1–2	4–7–1 (2–3–1)
November 27	New Hampshire*		Houston Field House • Troy, NY	Lovisa Selander	T 3–3 ^{OT}	4–7–2
November 28	New Hampshire*		Houston Field House • Troy, NY	Lovisa Selander	L 1–2	4–8–2
December 4	Yale		Houston Field House • Troy, NY	Lovisa Selander	L 1–4	4–9–2 (2–4–1)
December 5	Brown		Houston Field House • Troy, NY	Lovisa Selander	W 2–0	5–9–2 (3–4–1)
January 2, 2016	at Mercyhurst*		Mercyhurst Ice Center • Erie, PA	Lovisa Selander	L 1–3	5–10–2
January 3	at Mercyhurst*		Mercyhurst Ice Center • Erie, PA	Lovisa Selander	T 2–2 ^{OT}	5–10–3
January 8	#4 Quinnipiac		Houston Field House • Troy, NY	Lovisa Selander	T 0–0 ^{OT}	5–10–4 (3–4–2)
January 9	#4 Princeton		Houston Field House • Troy, NY	Lovisa Selander	L 2–3	5–11–4 (3–5–2)
January 15	Union		Houston Field House • Troy, NY	Lovisa Selander	W 2–0	6–11–4 (4–5–2)
January 16	at Union		Achilles Center • Schenectady, NY	Lovisa Selander	W 3–0	7–11–4 (5–5–2)
January 22	at Brown		Meehan Auditorium • Providence, RI	Lovisa Selander	W 6–2	8–11–4 (6–5–2)
January 26	at Yale		Ingalls Rink • New Haven, CT	Lovisa Selander	L 1–2	8–12–4 (6–6–2)
January 29	#10 Colgate		Houston Field House • Troy, NY	Lovisa Selander	L 3–5	8–13–4 (6–7–2)
January 30	Cornell		Houston Field House • Troy, NY	Lovisa Selander	W 2–1 ^{OT}	9–13–4 (7–7–2)
February 5	at Clarkson		Cheel Arena • Potsdam, NY	Lovisa Selander	L 1–9	9–14–4 (7–8–2)
February 6	at St. Lawrence		Appleton Arena • Canton, NY	Lovisa Selander	T 1–1 ^{OT}	9–14–5 (7–8–3)
February 12	Harvard		Houston Field House • Troy, NY	Lovisa Selander	T 1–1 ^{OT}	9–14–6 (7–8–4)
February 13	Dartmouth		Houston Field House • Troy, NY	Lovisa Selander	W 2–1	10–14–6 (8–8–4)
February 19	at #8 Princeton		Hobey Baker Memorial Rink • Princeton, NJ	Lovisa Selander	T 3–3 ^{OT}	10–14–7 (8–8–5)
February 20	at #4 Quinnipiac		TD Bank Sports Center • Hamden, CT	Lovisa Selander	L 0–4	10–15–7 (8–9–5)
ECAC Tournament
February 26	at #4 Quinnipiac*		TD Bank Sports Center • Hamden, CT (Quarterfinals, Game 1)	Lovisa Selander	L 2–3 ^{OT}	10–16–7
February 27	at #4 Quinnipiac*		TD Bank Sports Center • Hamden, CT (Quarterfinals, Game 2)	Lovisa Selander	L 1–2 ^{2OT}	10–17–7
*Non-conference game. ^{#}Rankings from USCHO.com Poll.

== Awards and honors ==
Lovisa Selander, G, Third Team ECAC All-Star

Lovisa Selander, G, ECAC All-Rookie Team
