= 2015–16 Princeton Tigers women's ice hockey season =

- Conference: 3rd ECAC Hockey
- Home ice: Hobey Baker Memorial Rink

Rankings
- USA Today/USA Hockey Magazine: 7th
- USCHO.com: 7th

Record
- Overall: 22-9-2
- Home: 10-5-1
- Road: 12-4-1

Coaches and captains
- Head coach: Jeff Kampersal
- Assistant coaches: Tony Maci; Cara Morey
- Captain: Cristin Shanahan
- Alternate captain(s): Molly Contini; Jaimie McDonell

The Princeton Tigers represented Princeton University in ECAC women's ice hockey during the 2015–16 NCAA Division I women's ice hockey season. The Tigers were stopped by nationally ranked Quinnipiac in the ECAC quarterfinals.

== Offseason ==
- June 26: Senior Goaltender Kimberly Newell was drafted by the New York Riveters of the NWHL.

=== Recruiting ===
Player	Position	Nationality	Notes
Keiko DeClerk	Forward	United States	Made Team USA U19 Development squad
Karlie Lund	Forward	United States	Attended The Blake School
Kimiko Marinacci	Defense	Canada	Played for Ottawa Lady Senators
Stephanie Sucharda	Defense	Canada	Blue-liner for Mississauga Jr. Chiefs

== 2015–16 Tigers ==
No.	Nat.	Player	Class	Pos	Height	DoB	Hometown	Previous team
2		Molly Strabley	Junior	D	5' 5" (1.65 m)		Yarmouth, Maine	Assabet Valley
5		Kimiko Marinacci	Freshman	D	5' 6" (1.68 m)		Ottawa, Ontario	Ottawa Lady Senators
6		Maddie Peake	Senior	F	5' 9" (1.75 m)		Shoreview, Minnesota	Mounds View HS
7		Jaime McDonell (A)	Senior	F	5' 8" (1.73 m)		East York, Ontario	Toronto Jr. Aeros
8		Audrey Potts	Junior	F	5' 6" (1.68 m)		Toronto, Ontario	Toronto Jr. Aeros
9		Molly Contini (A)	Junior	F	5' 8" (1.73 m)		Arthur, Ontario	Kitchener-Waterloo Rangers
10		Cassidy Tucker	Junior	F	5' 8" (1.73 m)		Plymouth, Michigan	Detroit Little Caesars
11		Kelsey Koelzer	Junior	D	5' 9" (1.75 m)		Horsham, Pennsylvania	New Jersey Rockets
12		Morgan Sly	Junior	F	5' 6" (1.68 m)		Collingwood, Ontario	Toronto Jr. Aeros
16		Karen MacDonald	Senior	D	5' 8" (1.73 m)		Ottawa, Ontario	Ottawa Jr. Senators
17		Keiko DeClerck	Freshman	F	5' 5" (1.65 m)		San Jose, California	Team USA Development U19
18		Hillary Lloyd	Junior	F	5' 3" (1.6 m)		Toronto, Ontario	Mississauga Jr. Chiefs
19		Cristin Shanahan (C)	Senior	F	5' 8" (1.73 m)		Ottawa, Ontario	Ottawa Jr. Senators
21		Karlie Lund	Freshman	F	5' 10" (1.78 m)		Eden Prairie, Minnesota	Blake School
22		Kiersten Falck	Sophomore	F	5' 5" (1.65 m)		Ham Lake, Minnesota	Minnesota Jr. Whitecaps
23		Emily Achterkirch	Sophomore	D	5' 7" (1.7 m)		St. Michael, Minnesota	Minnesota Jr. Whitecaps
24		Fiona McKenna	Junior	F	5' 8" (1.73 m)		Burr Ridge, Illinois	Team USA U18
25		Stephanie Sucharda	Freshman	D	5' 8" (1.73 m)		Mississauga, Ontario	Mississauga Jr. Chiefs
31		Alysia Dasilva	Sophomore	G	5' 7" (1.7 m)		Oakville, Ontario	Mississauga Jr. Chiefs
33		Kimberly Newell	Senior	G	5' 9" (1.75 m)		Vancouver, British Columbia	Team Canada U18

== Schedule ==
Date	Opponent^{#}	Rank^{#}	Site	Decision	Result	Record
Regular Season
October 23	at Mercyhurst*		Mercyhurst Ice Center • Erie, PA	Kimberly Newell	W 3–2	1–0–0
October 24	at Mercyhurst*		Mercyhurst Ice Center • Erie, PA	Kimberly Newell	W 2–1	2–0–0
October 30	at Yale		Ingalls Rink • New Haven, CT	Kimberly Newell	W 4–3	3–0–0 (1–0–0)
October 31	at Brown		Meehan Auditorium • Providence, RI	Alysia DaSilva	W 3–0	4–0–0 (2–0–0)
November 6	Cornell	#10	Hobey Baker Memorial Rink • Princeton, NJ	Alysia DaSilva	L 1–2	4–1–0 (2–1–0)
November 7	Colgate	#10	Hobey Baker Memorial Rink • Princeton, NJ	Kimberly Newell	W 3–2	5–1–0 (3–1–0)
November 13	at #8 Quinnipiac	#10	TD Bank Sports Center • Hamden, CT	Kimberly Newell	T 1–1 ^{OT}	5–1–1 (3–1–1)
November 14	#8 Quinnipiac	#10	Hobey Baker Memorial Rink • Princeton, NJ	Kimberly Newell	L 2–4	5–2–1 (3–2–1)
November 20	at St. Lawrence	#10	Appleton Arena • Canton, NY	Kimberly Newell	L 2–3	5–3–1 (3–3–1)
November 21	at #4 Clarkson	#10	Cheel Arena • Potsdam, NY	Kimberly Newell	L 0–3	5–4–1 (3–4–1)
November 27	at RIT*		Gene Polisseni Center • Rochester, NY	Kimberly Newell	W 4–0	6–4–1
November 28	at RIT*		Gene Polisseni Center • Rochester, NY	Alysia DaSilva	W 6–1	7–4–1
December 4	#7 Harvard		Hobey Baker Memorial Rink • Princeton, NJ	Kimberly Newell	W 2–1 ^{OT}	8–4–1 (4–4–1)
December 5	Dartmouth		Hobey Baker Memorial Rink • Princeton, NJ	Kimberly Newell	W 4–1	9–4–1 (5–4–1)
December 11	Penn State*		Hobey Baker Memorial Rink • Princeton, NJ	Kimberly Newell	W 4–0	10–4–1
December 12	Penn State*		Hobey Baker Memorial Rink • Princeton, NJ	Alysia DaSilva	W 3–2	11–4–1
January 1, 2016	Brown		Hobey Baker Memorial Rink • Princeton, NJ	Kimberly Newell	W 6–1	12–4–1 (6–4–1)
January 2	Yale		Hobey Baker Memorial Rink • Princeton, NJ	Kimberly Newell	W 5–1	13–4–1 (7–4–1)
January 8	at Union		Achilles Center • Schenectady, NY	Alysia DaSilva	W 5–0	14–4–1 (8–4–1)
January 9	at Rensselaer		Houston Field House • Troy, NY	Kimberly Newell	W 3–2	15–4–1 (9–4–1)
January 25	at Connecticut*	#9	Freitas Ice Forum • Storrs, CT	Kimberly Newell	W 4–0	16–4–1
January 29	at Dartmouth	#9	Thompson Arena • Hanover, NH	Kimberly Newell	W 4–1	17–4–1 (10–4–1)
January 30	at Harvard	#9	Bright-Landry Hockey Center • Allston, MA	Kimberly Newell	L 1–4	17–5–1 (10–5–1)
February 5	at #10 Colgate	#9	Starr Rink • Hamilton, NY	Kimberly Newell	W 4–2	18–5–1 (11–5–1)
February 6	at Cornell	#9	Lynah Rink • Ithaca, NY	Kimberly Newell	W 5–0	19–5–1 (12–5–1)
February 12	#5 Clarkson	#8	Hobey Baker Memorial Rink • Princeton, NJ	Kimberly Newell	L 1–2	19–6–1 (12–6–1)
February 13	St. Lawrence	#8	Hobey Baker Memorial Rink • Princeton, NJ	Kimberly Newell	W 4–3 ^{OT}	20–6–1 (13–6–1)
February 19	Rensselaer	#8	Hobey Baker Memorial Rink • Princeton, NJ	Kimberly Newell	T 3–3 ^{OT}	20–6–2 (13–6–2)
February 20	Union	#8	Hobey Baker Memorial Rink • Princeton, NJ	Kimberly Newell	W 4–2	21–6–2 (14–6–2)
ECAC Tournament
February 26	St. Lawrence*	#8	Hobey Baker Memorial Rink • Princeton, NJ (Quarterfinals, Game 1)	Kimberly Newell	L 0–1	21–7–2
February 27	St. Lawrence*	#8	Hobey Baker Memorial Rink • Princeton, NJ (Quarterfinals, Game 2)	Kimberly Newell	W 4–3	22–7–2
February 28	St. Lawrence*	#8	Hobey Baker Memorial Rink • Princeton, NJ (Quarterfinals, Game 3)	Kimberly Newell	L 3–4 ^{OT}	22–8–2
NCAA Tournament
March 12	at #3 Minnesota*	#7	Ridder Arena • Minneapolis, MN (Quarterfinal Game)	Kimberly Newell	L 2–6	22–9–2
*Non-conference game. ^{#}Rankings from USCHO.com Poll.

== Awards and honors ==
- Jeff Kampersal, ECAC Coach of the Year
- Kelsey Koelzer, ECAC Defenseman of the Year
- Karlie Lund, ECAC Rookie of the Year
- Kelsey Koelzer, Defense, All-ECAC First Team
- Karlie Lund, Forward, All-ECAC First Team
- Karlie Lund, Forward, All-ECAC Rookie Team
