= 2015–16 Quinnipiac Bobcats women's ice hockey season =

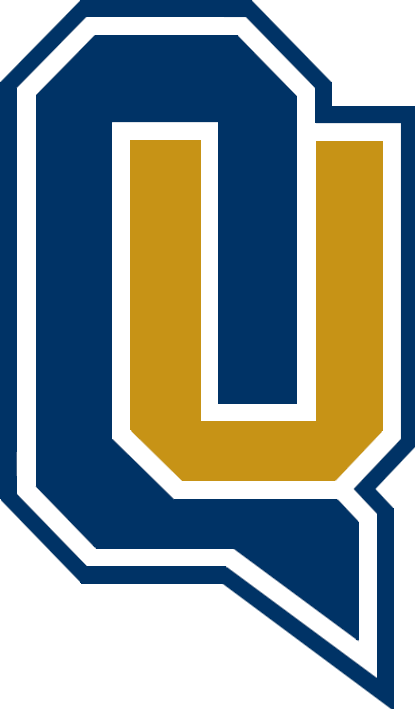

2015 Nutmeg Classic, 3-0 over Yale ECAC Regular Season Champions ECAC Tournament Champions Second Appearance in NCAA Tournament, Lost in Quarterfinal round to Clarkson, 0-1
- Conference: 1st ECAC
- Home ice: High Point Solutions Arena at TD Bank Sports Center, Hamden, CT

Rankings
- USCHO.com: 5th
- USA Today/USA Hockey Magazine: 5th

Record
- Overall: 30-3-5
- Home: 18-1-4
- Road: 11-2-1
- Neutral: 1-0-0

Coaches and captains
- Head coach: Cassandra Turner
- Assistant coaches: Amanda Mazzotta; Eddie Ardito
- Captain: Cyndey Roesler
- Alternate captain(s): Kristin Tamberg; Emma Woods

The 2015–16 Quinnipiac Bobcats women's ice hockey season was the 15th season of play for the Quinnipiac Bobcats program. They represented Quinnipiac University during the 2015-16 NCAA Division I women's ice hockey season and played their home games at TD Bank Sports Center. They won the ECAC Hockey tournament championship for the first time in program history.

== Offseason ==
- Shiann Darkangelo (Class of '15) was selected for Team USA in the 4 Nations Cup tournament.

=== Recruiting ===
Player	Position	Nationality	Notes
Claire Lachner	Goaltender	United States	Minded net for Detroit Little Caesars U19
Mackenzie Lancaster	Forward	United States	Played for Pittsburgh Penguins Elite U19
Miranda Lantz	Forward	Canada	Member of 2015 Team Ontario
Kate MacKenzie	Defense	Canada	Attended St. Mary's Academy
Randi Marcon	Forward	Canada	Named to Team Manitoba in 2015
Melissa Samoskevich	Forward	United States	Won Gold with Team USA U18 at 2015 World U18 Championship

== 2015–16 Bobcats ==
No.	Nat.	Player	Class	Pos	Height	DoB	Hometown	Previous team
1		Claire Lachner	Freshman	G	5' 5" (1.65 m)		Commerce, Michigan	Little Caesars U19
4		Kate MacKenzie	Freshman	D	5' 9" (1.75 m)		Winnipeg, Manitoba	Team Manitoba
6		Meghan Turner	Junior	F	5' 6" (1.68 m)		Bedford, New Hampshire	Assabet Valley
7		Nicole Kosta	Senior	F	5' 5" (1.65 m)		Mississauga, Ontario	Team Canada U18
8		Tori DeAngelis	Sophomore	F	5' 8" (1.73 m)		Saunderstown, Rhode Island	Assabet Valley
9		Alicia Barry	Sophomore	D	5' 9" (1.75 m)		Hanson, Massachusetts	Assabet Valley
10		Taryn Baumgardt	Junior	D	5' 7" (1.7 m)		Innisfail, Alberta	Team Canada U18
11		Melissa Samoskevich	Freshman	F	5' 4" (1.63 m)		Sandy Hook, Connecticut	Team USA U18
12		Danielle Marmer	Junior	F	5' 6" (1.68 m)		Dorset, Vermont	Connecticut Polar Bears
13		Kenzie Lancaster	Freshman	F	5' 8" (1.73 m)		Waxhaw, North Carolina	Pittsburgh Penguins Elite U19
15		Kristen Tamberg (A)	Senior	D	5' 7" (1.7 m)		Toronto, Ontario	Mississauga Jr. Chiefs
16		Lindsey West	Senior	D	5' 8" (1.73 m)		Ajax, Ontario	Whitby Jr. Wolves
17		Nicole Brown	Senior	F	5' 7" (1.7 m)		Oshawa, Ontario	Whitby Jr. Wolves
18		Emma Woods (A)	Junior	F	5' 7" (1.7 m)		Burford, Ontario	Team Ontario Red
19		Shannon Cherpak	Sophomore	D	5' 7" (1.7 m)		Enfield, Connecticut	Team Pittsburgh U19
21		Cydney Roesler (C)	Senior	D	5' 9" (1.75 m)		Stittsville, Ontario	Team Canada U18
22		Taylar Cianfarano	Sophomore	F	5' 5" (1.65 m)		Oswego, New York	Team USA U18
23		Raquel Pennoyer	Sophomore	F	5' 4" (1.63 m)		Rehoboth, Massachusetts	Massachusetts Spitfires
24		Nicole Connery	Senior	F	5' 6" (1.68 m)		Newmarket, Ontario	Team Canada U18
25		Emma Greco	Junior	D	5' 9" (1.75 m)		Burlington, Ontario	Team Ontario Red
26		Mika Nervick	Junior	F	5' 4" (1.63 m)		Lakeville, Minnesota	Shattuck-St. Mary's
28		Miranda Lantz	Freshman	F	5' 6" (1.68 m)		Mildmay, Ontario	Cambridge Jr. Rivulettes
29		Randi Marcon	Freshman	F	5' 11" (1.8 m)		Winnipeg, Manitoba	Team Manitoba
34		Sydney Rossman	Junior	G	5' 5" (1.65 m)		Excelsior, Minnesota	Minnesota Jr. Whitecaps

== Schedule ==
Date	Opponent^{#}	Rank^{#}	Site	Decision	Result	Record
Regular Season
October 2	Mercyhurst*	#7	High Point Solutions Arena • Hamden, CT	Sydney Rossman	T 3–3 ^{OT}	0–0–1
October 3	Mercyhurst*	#7	High Point Solutions Arena • Hamden, CT	Sydney Rossman	W 2–1	1–0–1
October 9	at Maine*	#8	Alfond Arena • Orono, ME	Sydney Rossman	W 3–1	2–0–1
October 10	at Maine*	#8	Alfond Arena • Orono, ME	Sydney Rossman	W 5–1	3–0–1
October 24	Yale*	#8	High Point Solutions Arena • Hamden, CT	Sydney Rossman	W 6–3	4–0–1
October 30	at Brown	#5	Meehan Auditorium • Providence, RI	Sydney Rossman	W 4–0	5–0–1 (1–0–0)
October 31	at Yale	#5	Ingalls Rink • New Haven, CT	Sydney Rossman	L 3–4	5–1–1 (1–1–0)
November 6	Colgate	#7	High Point Solutions Arena • Hamden, CT	Sydney Rossman	T 0–0 ^{OT}	5–1–2 (1–1–1)
November 7	Cornell	#7	High Point Solutions Arena • Hamden, CT	Sydney Rossman	W 3–1	6–1–2 (2–1–1)
November 13	#10 Princeton	#8	High Point Solutions Arena • Hamden, CT	Sydney Rossman	T 1–1 ^{OT}	6–1–3 (2–1–2)
November 14	at #10 Princeton	#8	Hobey Baker Memorial Rink • Princeton, NJ	Sydney Rossman	W 4–2	7–1–3 (3–1–2)
November 20	at #4 Clarkson	#8	Cheel Arena • Potsdam, NY	Sydney Rossman	W 3–0	8–1–3 (4–1–2)
November 21	at St. Lawrence	#8	Appleton Arena • Canton, NY	Sydney Rossman	W 5–0	9–1–3 (5–1–2)
November 27	vs. Connecticut*	#5	Ingalls Rink • New Haven, CT (Nutmeg Classic, Opening Game)	Sydney Rossman	W 1–0	10–1–3
November 28	at Yale*	#5	Ingalls Rink • New Haven, CT (Nutmeg Classic, Championship Game)	Sydney Rossman	W 3–0	11–1–3
December 4	Dartmouth	#4	High Point Solutions Arena • Hamden, CT	Sydney Rossman	W 7–1	12–1–3 (6–1–2)
December 5	#7 Harvard	#4	High Point Solutions Arena • Hamden, CT	Sydney Rossman	W 2–1 ^{OT}	13–1–3 (7–1–2)
December 11	New Hampshire*	#4	High Point Solutions Arena • Hamden, CT	Sydney Rossman	W 6–0	14–1–3
January 1, 2016	Yale	#4	High Point Solutions Arena • Hamden, CT	Sydney Rossman	W 1–0	15–1–3 (8–1–2)
January 2	Brown	#4	High Point Solutions Arena • Hamden, CT	Sydney Rossman	W 5–1	16–1–3 (9–1–2)
January 8	at Rensselaer	#4	Houston Field House • Troy, NY	Sydney Rossman	T 0–0 ^{OT}	16–1–4 (9–1–3)
January 9	at Union	#4	Achilles Center • Schenectady, NY	Sydney Rossman	W 5–0	17–1–4 (10–1–3)
January 15	Robert Morris*	#4	High Point Solutions Arena • Hamden, CT	Sydney Rossman	W 3–2	18–1–4
January 16	Robert Morris*	#4	High Point Solutions Arena • Hamden, CT	Sydney Rossman	W 2–0	19–1–4
January 20	Boston University*	#4	High Point Solutions Arena • Hamden, CT	Sydney Rossman	W 6–1	20–1–4
January 29	at Harvard	#4	Bright-Landry Hockey Center • Allston, MA	Sydney Rossman	W 1–0	21–1–4 (11–1–3)
January 30	at Dartmouth	#4	Thompson Arena • Hanover, NH	Sydney Rossman	W 2–1	22–1–4 (12–1–3)
February 5	at Cornell	#4	Lynah Rink • Ithaca, NY	Sydney Rossman	W 4–1	23–1–4 (13–1–3)
February 6	at #10 Colgate	#4	Starr Rink • Hamilton, NY	Sydney Rossman	L 2–3	23–2–4 (13–2–3)
February 12	St. Lawrence	#4	High Point Solutions Arena • Hamden, CT	Sydney Rossman	W 3–0	24–2–4 (14–2–3)
February 13	#5 Clarkson	#4	High Point Solutions Arena • Hamden, CT	Sydney Rossman	T 2–2 ^{OT}	24–2–5 (14–2–4)
February 19	Union	#4	High Point Solutions Arena • Hamden, CT	Sydney Rossman	W 9–0	25–2–5 (15–2–4)
February 20	Rensselaer	#4	High Point Solutions Arena • Hamden, CT	Sydney Rossman	W 4–0	26–2–5 (16–2–4)
ECAC Tournament
February 26	Rensselaer*	#4	High Point Solutions Arena • Hamden, CT (Quarterfinals, Game 1)	Sydney Rossman	W 3–2	27–2–5
February 27	Rensselaer*	#4	High Point Solutions Arena • Hamden, CT (Quarterfinals, Game 2)	Sydney Rossman	W 2–1	28–2–5
March 5	St. Lawrence*	#4	High Point Solutions Arena • Hamden, CT (Semifinal Game)	Sydney Rossman	W 2–1	29–2–5
March 6	#5 Clarkson*	#4	High Point Solutions Arena • Hamden, CT (ECAC Championship Game)	Sydney Rossman	W 1–0	30–2–5
NCAA Tournament
March 12	#5 Clarkson*	#4	High Point Solutions Arena • Hamden, CT (Quarterfinal Game)	Sydney Rossman	L 0–1	30–3–5
*Non-conference game. ^{#}Rankings from USCHO.com Poll.

== Awards and honors ==
- Taylar Cianfarano, ECAC Player of the Year
- Taylar Cianfarano, ECAC Best Forward
- Sydney Rossman, ECAC Best Goaltender
- Kristen Tamberg, Mandi Schwartz Student-Athlete of the Year
- Taylar Cianfarano, Forward, All-ECAC First Team
- Sydney Rossman, Goaltender, All-ECAC First Team
- Kristen Tamberg, Defense, All-ECAC Second Team
- Nicole Kosta, Forward, All-ECAC Third Team
- Emma Woods, Forward, All-ECAC Third Team
- Melissa Samoskevich, Forward, All-ECAC Rookie Team
- Sydney Rossman was second nationally in Goals Against Average (0.90)
