= 2015–16 Brown Bears women's ice hockey season =

- Conference: 11th ECAC
- Home ice: Meehan Auditorium

Record
- Overall: 3–23–3
- Home: 1–10–1
- Road: 2–13–2

Coaches and captains
- Head coach: Bob Kenneally
- Assistant coaches: Jillian Kirchner; Kirsti Hussey
- Captain(s): Alli Rolandelli; Kelly Micholson
- Alternate captain(s): Hunter Davis; Maddie Woo

The Brown Bears represented Brown University in ECAC women's ice hockey during the 2015–16 NCAA Division I women's ice hockey season. They were led by new head coach, Bob Kenneally.

== Offseason ==
- April 1: Robert Kennelley, a former men's hockey player for Brown (class of 1990), was named head coach. Kenneally had been the Executive Associate for Brown Athletics prior to assuming his new role.

== Recruiting ==
Player	Position	Nationality	Notes
Bridget Carey	Forward	United States	Skated for Bay State Breakers
Jenna Hewitt-Kenda	Forward	Canada	Played with Pacific Steelers
Katie Lynch	Forward	United States	Attended Benilde-St. Margaret's School
Cara Najjar	Forward/Defense	United States	Outstanding Athlete at Buckingham, Browne & Nichols
Abby Niewchas	Defense	Canada	Attended Edge School
Leah Olson	Defense	United States	Played with Assabet Valley

== Roster ==
No.	Nat.	Player	Class	Pos	Height	DoB	Hometown	Previous team
2		Alli Rolandelli (C)	Senior	D	5' 3" (1.6 m)		Minnetonka, Minnesota	Minnesota Jr. Whitecaps
3		Katie Lynch	Freshman	F	5' 7" (1.7 m)		Victoria, Minnesota	Benilde-St. Margaret's
5		Hunter Davis (A)	Senior	D	5' 8" (1.73 m)		Clifton Park, New York	Connecticut Polar Bears
6		Kelly Micholson (C)	Senior	D	5' 7" (1.7 m)		Elk Grove Village, Illinois	Chicago Mission
7		Erin Conway	Junior	F	5' 2" (1.57 m)		Jackson, Michigan	Choate-Rosemary Hall
9		Jenna Hewitt-Kenda	Freshman	F	5' 7" (1.7 m)		North Vancouver, British Columbia	Pacific Steelers
11		Samantha Swanstrom	Sophomore	F	5' 4" (1.63 m)		Ham Lake, Minnesota	Blaine HS
13		Abby Niewchas	Freshman	D	5' 8" (1.73 m)		Cochrane, Alberta	Edge School
15		Maddie Woo (A)	Junior	F	5' 7" (1.7 m)		Plymouth, Minnesota	Maple Grove HS
16		Katie Swanstrom	Sophomore	F	5' 4" (1.63 m)		Ham Lake, Minnesota	Minnesota Jr. Whitecaps
17		Cara Najjar	Freshman	F/D	5' 5" (1.65 m)		Stoneham, Massachusetts	Assabet Valley
18		Leah Olson	Freshman	D	5' 5" (1.65 m)		East Harwich, Massachusetts	Assabet Valley
19		Cynthia Kyin	Sophomore	D	5' 6" (1.68 m)		Skokie, Illinois	Chicago Mission
21		Caroline Buckholtz	Sophomore	F/D	5' 4" (1.63 m)		Greenlawn, New York	Choate-Rosemary Hall
22		Rachael Cholak	Sophomore	F	5' 5" (1.65 m)		Kenosha, Wisconsin	Chicago Young Americans
25		Dara Wais	Sophomore	F	5' 6" (1.68 m)		Baltimore, Maryland	Washington Pride
27		Catherine LeBouef	Junior	D	5' 6" (1.68 m)		Dieppe, New Brunswick	Brewster Academy
28		Bridget Carey	Freshman	F	5' 5" (1.65 m)		Weymouth, Massachusetts	Bay State Breakers
30		Julianne Landry	Sophomore	G	5' 7" (1.7 m)		Hanover, Massachusetts	Assabet Valley
32		Sam Donovan	Sophomore	F	5' 2" (1.57 m)		New Brighton, Minnesota	Elite Black
33		Monica Elvin	Junior	G	5' 6" (1.68 m)		Oakland, California	Alaska All-Stars

== Schedule ==
Date	Opponent^{#}	Rank^{#}	Site	Decision	Result	Record
Regular Season
October 23	at Maine*		Norway Savings Bank Arena • Auburn, ME	Monica Elvin	L 0–4	0–1–0
October 24	at Maine*		Alfond Arena • Orono, ME	Julianne Landry	L 1–4	0–2–0
October 30	#5 Quinnipiac		Meehan Auditorium • Providence, RI	Monica Elvin	L 0–4	0–3–0 (0–1–0)
October 31	Princeton		Meehan Auditorium • Providence, RI	Julianne Landry	L 0–3	0–4–0 (0–2–0)
November 6	Dartmouth		Meehan Auditorium • Providence, RI	Monica Elvin	L 0–4	0–5–0 (0–3–0)
November 7	#9 Harvard		Meehan Auditorium • Providence, RI	Julianne Landry	L 1–5	0–6–0 (0–4–0)
November 14	Sacred Heart*		Meehan Auditorium • Providence, RI	Monica Elvin	W 6–1	1–6–0
November 20	at RIT*		Gene Polisseni Center • Rochester, NY	Monica Elvin	L 1–5	1–7–0
November 21	at RIT*		Gene Polisseni Center • Rochester, NY	Julianne Landry	W 2–1	2–7–0
November 28	at Providence*		Schneider Arena • Providence, RI (Mayor's Cup)	Monica Elvin	L 1–6	2–8–0
December 4	at Union		Achilles Center • Schenectady, NY	Julianne Landry	W 2–0	3–8–0 (1–4–0)
December 5	at Rensselaer		Houston Field House • Troy, NY	Monica Elvin	L 0–2	3–9–0 (1–5–0)
January 1, 2016	at Princeton		Hobey Baker Memorial Rink • Princeton, NJ	Julianne Landry	L 1–6	3–10–0 (1–6–0)
January 2	at #4 Quinnipiac		TD Bank Sports Center • Hamden, CT	Monica Elvin	L 1–5	3–11–0 (1–7–0)
January 8	St. Lawrence		Meehan Auditorium • Providence, RI	Julianne Landry	L 1–2	3–12–0 (1–8–0)
January 9	#5 Clarkson		Meehan Auditorium • Providence, RI	Monica Elvin	L 0–7	3–13–0 (1–9–0)
January 15	at Colgate		Starr Rink • Hamilton, NY	Julianne Landry	L 2–6	3–14–0 (1–10–0)
January 16	at Cornell		Lynah Rink • Ithaca, NY	Monica Elvin	T 2–2 ^{OT}	3–14–1 (1–10–1)
January 19	at Merrimack*		Volpe Complex • North Andover, MA	Julianne Landry	L 1–4	3–15–1
January 22	Rensselaer		Meehan Auditorium • Providence, RI	Monica Elvin	L 2–6	3–16–1 (1–11–1)
January 23	Union		Meehan Auditorium • Providence, RI	Julianne Landry	T 2–2 ^{OT}	3–16–2 (1–11–2)
January 29	at Yale		Ingalls Rink • New Haven, CT	Monica Elvin	L 1–4	3–17–2 (1–12–2)
January 30	Yale		Meehan Auditorium • Providence, RI	Julianne Landry	L 3–6	3–18–2 (1–13–2)
February 5	at Harvard		Bright-Landry Hockey Center • Allston, MA	Monica Elvin	T 3–3 ^{OT}	3–18–3 (1–13–3)
February 6	at Dartmouth		Thompson Arena • Hanover, NH	Julianne Landry	L 0–5	3–19–3 (1–14–3)
February 12	Cornell		Meehan Auditorium • Providence, RI	Monica Elvin	L 2–4	3–20–3 (1–15–3)
February 13	Colgate		Meehan Auditorium • Providence, RI	Julianne Landry	L 2–3	3–21–3 (1–16–3)
February 19	at #5 Clarkson		Cheel Arena • Potsdam, NY	Monica Elvin	L 0–7	3–22–3 (1–17–3)
February 20	at St. Lawrence		Appleton Arena • Canton, NY	Julianne Landry	L 0–3	3–23–3 (1–18–3)
*Non-conference game. ^{#}Rankings from USCHO.com Poll.
