= 2015–16 Cornell Big Red women's ice hockey season =

2015 Windjammer Classic champions
- Conference: 7th ECAC Hockey
- Home ice: Lynah Rink

Record
- Overall: 13–14–4
- Home: 3–6–4
- Road: 9–8–0
- Neutral: 1–0–0

Coaches and captains
- Head coach: Doug Derraugh
- Assistant coaches: Danielle Bilodeau; Edith Racine; Louise Derraugh
- Captain: Cassandra Poudrier
- Alternate captain(s): Taylor Woods; Stefannie Moak

The Cornell Big Red represented Cornell University in ECAC women's ice hockey during the 2015–16 NCAA Division I women's ice hockey season. The Big Red had the challenge of trying to find success despite the graduation of stars Brianne Jenner, Emily Fulton and Jillian Saulnier.

== Offseason ==
Three 2015 graduates, Brianne Jenner (Calgary Inferno), Emily Fulton (Toronto Furies) and Jillian Saulnier (Calgary Inferno), were all selected in the CWHL draft.

=== Recruiting ===
Player	Position	Nationality	Notes
Marlene Boissonnault	Goaltender	Canada	Member of Team Canada U18
Diana Buckley	Forward	United States	Competed with Washington Pride
Pippy Gerace	Forward	United States	travelled to Canada to play for the Etobicoke Jr. Dolphins
Micah Hart	Defense	Canada	Team Canada U18 for two years
Christian Higham	Forward	Canada	Played on Team Canada U18 alongside Boissonnault and Hart
Lenka Serdar	Forward	United States	Attended North American Hockey Academy

== 2015–16 Big Red ==
No.	Nat.	Player	Class	Pos	Height	DoB	Hometown	Previous team
1		Marlène Boissonnault	Freshman	G	5' 10" (1.78 m)		Dundee, New Brunswick	Team Canada U18
2		Erin O'Connor	Sophomore	D	5' 10" (1.78 m)		Evanston, Illinois	Chicago Young Americans
4		Sydnee Saracco	Sophomore	D	5' 3" (1.6 m)		Countryside, Illinois	Chicago Mission
5		Cassandra Poudrier (C)	Senior	D	5' 5" (1.65 m)		Mont-Laurier, Quebec	Team Canada U18
8		Micah Hart	Freshman	D	5' 9" (1.75 m)		Saanichton, British Columbia	Team Canada U18
9		Hannah Bunton	Junior	F	5' 9" (1.75 m)		Belleville, Ontario	Team Canada U18
10		Brianna Veerman	Junior	F	5' 5" (1.65 m)		Burlington, Ontario	Aurora Jr. Panthers
13		Caroline DeBruin	Junior	F	5' 7" (1.7 m)		Burlington, Ontario	Aurora Jr. Panthers
15		Pippy Gerace	Freshman	F	5' 2" (1.57 m)		Jamestown, New York	Etobicoke Jr. Dolphins
17		Lenka Serdar	Freshman	F	5' 8" (1.73 m)		Lexington, Massachusetts	North American Hockey Academy
18		Jess Brown	Senior	F	5' 3" (1.6 m)		Cleveland, Ohio	Pittsburgh Jr. Penguins
19		Diana Buckley	Freshman	F	5' 8" (1.73 m)		Woodbridge, Virginia	Washindton Pride
20		Anna Zorn	Senior	F	5' 11" (1.8 m)		Churchville, New York	Rochester EDGE
21		Morgan Richardson	Senior	D	5' 6" (1.68 m)		Ottawa, Ontario	Team Canada U18
23		Sydney Smith	Junior	D	5' 3" (1.6 m)		Lethbridge, Alberta	Team Canada U18
24		Sarah Knee	Sophomore	D	6' 1" (1.85 m)		Toronto, Ontario	Toronto Jr. Aeros
25		Taylor Woods (A)	Senior	F	5' 2" (1.57 m)		Morden, Manitoba	Team Canada U18
26		Kaitlin Doering	Junior	F	5' 8" (1.73 m)		Waterloo, Ontario	Mississauga Jr. Chiefs
27		Christian Higham	Freshman	F	5' 6" (1.68 m)		Winnipeg, Manitoba	Mississauga Jr. Chiefs
29		Amelia Broughn	Sophomore	G	5' 7" (1.7 m)		Toronto, Ontario	Mississauga Jr. Chiefs
31		Paula Voorheis	Junior	G	6' 0" (1.83 m)		Shanty Bay, Ontario	Aurora Jr. Panthers
35		Stefannie Moak (A)	Senior	G	5' 7" (1.7 m)		Middle Sackville, Nova Scotia	Metro Boston Pizza Midget AAA

== Schedule ==
Date	Opponent^{#}	Rank^{#}	Site	Decision	Result	Record
Regular season
October 23	#2 Boston College*	#9	Lynah Rink • Ithaca, NY	Paula Voorheis	L 1–4	0–1–0
October 24	#2 Boston College*	#9	Lynah Rink • Ithaca, NY	Marlène Boissonnault	L 0–8	0–2–0
October 30	Rensselaer		Lynah Rink • Ithaca, NY	Paula Voorheis	L 1–2 ^{OT}	0–3–0 (0–1–0)
October 31	Union		Lynah Rink • Ithaca, NY	Stefannie Moak	T 2–2 ^{OT}	0–3–1 (0–1–1)
November 6	at #10 Princeton		Hobey Baker Memorial Rink • Princeton, NJ	Paula Voorheis	W 2–1	1–3–1 (1–1–1)
November 7	at #7 Quinnipiac		TD Bank Sports Center • Hamden, CT	Paula Voorheis	L 1–3	1–4–1 (1–2–1)
November 14	at Syracuse*		Oncenter War Memorial Arena • Syracuse, NY	Marlène Boissonnault	W 5–2	2–4–1
November 17	Colgate		Lynah Rink • Ithaca, NY	Paula Voorheis	T 3–3 ^{OT}	2–4–2 (1–2–2)
November 20	at Mercyhurst*		Mercyhurst Ice Center • Erie, PA	Amelia Boughn	L 1–5	2–5–2
November 21	at Mercyhurst*		Mercyhurst Ice Center • Erie, PA	Paula Voorheis	W 6–1	3–5–2
November 28	vs. Boston University*		Gutterson Fieldhouse • Burlington, VT (Windjammer Classic, opening round)	Marlène Boissonnault	W 6–1	4–5–2
November 29	at Vermont*		Gutterson Fieldhouse • Burlington, VT (Windjammer Classic, championship game)	Paula Voorheis	W 4–0	5–5–2
December 4	at St. Lawrence		Appleton Arena • Canton, NY	Paula Voorheis	W 4–3	6–5–2 (2–2–2)
December 5	at #5 Clarkson		Cheel Arena • Potsdam, NY	Paula Voorheis	L 0–4	6–6–2 (2–3–2)
January 8, 2016	at #9 Harvard		Bright-Landry Hockey Center • Allston, MA	Paula Voorheis	L 0–2	6–7–2 (2–4–2)
January 9	at Dartmouth		Thompson Arena • Hanover, NH	Marlène Boissonnault	W 5–3	7–7–2 (3–4–2)
January 12	at Colgate		Starr Rink • Hamilton, NY	Paula Voorheis	L 3–4	7–8–2 (3–5–2)
January 15	Yale		Lynah Rink • Ithaca, NY	Paula Voorheis	W 6–4	8–8–2 (4–5–2)
January 16	Brown		Lynah Rink • Ithaca, NY	Paula Voorheis	T 2–2 ^{OT}	8–8–3 (4–5–3)
January 22	Clarkson		Lynah Rink • Ithaca, NY	Paula Voorheis	T 2–2 ^{OT}	8–8–4 (4–5–4)
January 23	St. Lawrence		Lynah Rink • Ithaca, NY	Paula Voorheis	L 1–5	8–9–4 (4–6–4)
January 29	Union		Achilles Center • Schenectady, NY	Marlène Boissonnault	W 3–1	9–9–4 (5–6–4)
January 30	Rensselaer		Houston Field House • Troy, NY	Paula Voorheis	L 1–2 ^{OT}	9–10–4 (5–7–4)
February 5	#4 Quinnipiac		Lynah Rink • Ithaca, NY	Paula Voorheis	L 1–4	9–11–4 (5–8–4)
February 6	#9 Princeton		Lynah Rink • Ithaca, NY	Paula Voorheis	L 0–5	9–12–4 (5–9–4)
February 12	at Brown		Meehan Auditorium • Providence, RI	Marlène Boissonnault	W 4–2	10–12–4 (6–9–4)
February 13	at Yale		Ingalls Rink • New Haven, CT	Paula Voorheis	W 4–2	11–12–4 (7–9–4)
February 19	Dartmouth		Lynah Rink • Ithaca, NY	Paula Voorheis	W 1–0	12–12–4 (8–9–4)
February 20	Harvard		Lynah Rink • Ithaca, NY	Paula Voorheis	W 3–2 ^{OT}	13–12–4 (9–9–4)
ECAC tournament
February 26	#5 Clarkson*		Cheel Arena • Potsdam, NY (Quarterfinals, game 1)	Paula Voorheis	L 0–2	13–13–4
February 27	#5 Clarkson*		Cheel Arena • Potsdam, NY (Quarterfinals, game 2)	Paula Voorheis	L 2–5	13–14–4
*Non-conference game. ^{#}Rankings from USCHO.com Poll.

== Awards and honors ==
- Micah Hart, D, All-ECAC Rookie Team
