= 2015–16 Yale Bulldogs women's ice hockey season =

- Conference: 9th ECAC Hockey
- Home ice: Ingalls Rink

Record
- Overall: 10–17–2
- Home: 6–6–1
- Road: 4–11–1

Coaches and captains
- Head coach: Joakim Flygh
- Assistant coaches: Rob Morgan; Jessica Koizumi
- Captain: Janelle Ferrara

The Yale Bulldogs represented Yale University in ECAC women's ice hockey during the 2015–16 NCAA Division I women's ice hockey season. The Bulldogs narrowly missed qualifying for the ECAC tournament.

== Offseason ==
- July 23: Hanna Åström was invited to the National Team Camp for Sweden.

=== Recruiting ===
Player	Position	Nationality	Notes
Jordan Chancellor	Forward	United States	Played for the Minnesota Ice Cats
Ariana DePinto	Forward/Defense	United States	Played with Chicago Young Americans
Kyra O'Brien	Goaltender	Canada	Minded net for Burlington Jr. Barracudas
Emma Vlasic	Forward	United States	Played with DePinto on Young Americans squad
Julia Yetman	Defense	Canada	Member of Team Quebec U18

== 2015–16 Bulldogs ==
No.	Nat.	Player	Class	Pos	Height	DoB	Hometown	Previous team
2		Kara Drexler	Sophomore	D	5' 4" (1.63 m)		Manhattan Beach, California	Anaheim Lady Ducks
4		Emily Monaghan	Sophomore	F	5' 7" (1.7 m)		Calgary, Alberta	Edge School
6		Jordan Chancellor	Freshman	F	5' 5" (1.65 m)		Ramsey, Minnesota	Minnesota Ice Cats
7		Abby Gahm	Junior	F/D	5' 4" (1.63 m)		Eagle River, Alaska	Brewster Academy
8		Eden Murray	Sophomore	F	5' 4" (1.63 m)		Medicine Hat, Alberta	Edge School
9		Gretchen Tarrant	Junior	F	5' 7" (1.7 m)		Colchester, Vermont	Rice Memorial
10		Jaimie Haddad	Senior	F	5' 7" (1.7 m)		Wilbraham, Massachusetts	Assabet Valley
11		Ariana DePinto	Freshman	D/F	5' 8" (1.73 m)		Carol Stream, Illinois	Chicago Young Americans
12		Janelle Ferrara (C)	Senior	D	5' 6" (1.68 m)		Winthrop, Massachusetts	Assabet Valley
14		Mallory Souliotis	Sophomore	D	5' 5" (1.65 m)		Acton, Massachusetts	Assabet Valley
15		Emma Vlasic	Freshman	F	5' 5" (1.65 m)		Wilmette, Illinois	Chicago Young Americans
18		Hanna Åström	Senior	F	5' 9" (1.75 m)		Örnsköldsvik, Sweden	Swedish National Team
19		Courtney Pensavalle	Sophomore	F	5' 9" (1.75 m)		Winchester, Massachusetts	Team Pittsburgh
20		Kaitlin Gately	Sophomore	F	5' 4" (1.63 m)		Hingham, Massachusetts	Assabet Valley
21		Brittany Wheeler	Sophomore	F	5' 6" (1.68 m)		Maple Grove, Minnesota	Benilde-St. Margaret's
24		Grace Wickens	Sophomore	D	5' 8" (1.73 m)		Ham Lake, Minnesota	Toronto Jr. Aeros
25		Kate Martini	Senior	D	5' 6" (1.68 m)		King City, Ontario	Toronto Jr. Aeros
29		Hanna Mandl	Junior	G	5' 6" (1.68 m)		Nobleton, Ontario	Brampton Jr. Thunder
33		Kyra O'Brien	Freshman	G	5' 7" (1.7 m)		Burlington, Ontario	Burlington Jr. Barracudas
35		Rachelle Graham	Senior	G	5' 10" (1.78 m)		Sault Ste. Marie, Ontario	Sault Ste. Marie Wildcats
44		Taylor Marchin	Junior	D	5' 7" (1.7 m)		Algonac, Michigan	Assabet Valley
55		Julia Yetman	Freshman	D	5' 5" (1.65 m)		Pierrefonds, Quebec	Team Quebec U18
88		Phoebe Staenz	Junior	F	5' 4" (1.63 m)		Zürich, Switzerland	Swiss National Team
95		Krista Yip-Chuk	Junior	F	5' 5" (1.65 m)		Whitby, Ontario	Whitby Jr. Wolves

== Schedule ==
Date	Opponent^{#}	Rank^{#}	Site	Decision	Result	Record
Regular Season
October 24	at #8 Quinnipiac*		TD Bank Sports Center • Hamden, CT	Hanna Mandl	L 3–6	0–1–0
October 30	Princeton		Ingalls Rink • New Haven, CT	Hanna Mandl	L 3–4	0–2–0 (0–1–0)
October 31	#5 Quinnipiac		Ingalls Rink • New Haven, CT	Hanna Mandl	W 4–3	1–2–0 (1–1–0)
November 3	at Boston University*		Walter Brown Arena • Boston, MA	Hanna Mandl	L 1–7	1–3–0
November 6	#9 Harvard		Ingalls Rink • New Haven, CT	Hanna Mandl	L 2–3	1–4–0 (1–2–0)
November 7	Dartmouth		Ingalls Rink • New Haven, CT	Hanna Mandl	T 3–3 ^{OT}	1–4–1 (1–2–1)
November 20	at #3 Minnesota*		Ridder Arena • Minneapolis, MN	Hanna Mandl	L 3–6	1–5–1
November 21	at #3 Minnesota*		Ridder Arena • Minneapolis	Hanna Mandl	L 1–4	1–6–1
November 27	Merrimack*		Ingalls Rink • New Haven, CT (Nutmeg Classic, opening round)	Hanna Mandl	W 3–1	2–6–1
November 28	#5 Quinnipiac*		Ingalls Rink • New Haven, CT (Nutmeg Classic, championship game)	Hanna Mandl	L 0–3	2–7–1
December 4	at Rensselaer		Houston Field House • Troy, NY	Hanna Mandl	W 4–1	3–7–1 (2–2–1)
December 5	at Union		Achilles Center • Schenectady, NY	Hanna Mandl	W 2–1 ^{OT}	4–7–1 (3–2–1)
December 13	at New Hampshire*		Whittemore Center • Durham, NH	Hanna Mandl	L 2–5	4–8–1
January 1, 2016	at #4 Quinnipiac		TD Bank Sports Center • Hamden, CT	Hanna Mandl	L 0–1	4–9–1 (3–3–1)
January 2	at Princeton		Hobey Baker Memorial Rink • Princeton, NJ	Hanna Mandl	L 1–5	4–10–1 (3–4–1)
January 8	#5 Clarkson		Ingalls Rink • New Haven, CT	Hanna Mandl	L 2–5	4–11–1 (3–5–1)
January 9	St. Lawrence		Ingalls Rink • New Haven, CT	Hanna Mandl	W 5–2	5–11–1 (4–5–1)
January 15	at Cornell		Lynah Rink • Ithaca, NY	Kyra O'Brien	L 4–6	5–12–1 (4–6–1)
January 16	at Colgate		Starr Rink • Hamilton, NY	Kyra O'Brien	L 3–4	5–13–1 (4–7–1)
January 22	Union		Ingalls Rink • New Haven, CT	Hanna Mandl	W 2–1	6–13–1 (5–7–1)
January 26	Rensselaer		Ingalls Rink • New Haven, CT	Hanna Mandl	W 2–1	7–13–1 (6–7–1)
January 29	Brown		Ingalls Rink • New Haven, CT	Hanna Mandl	W 4–1	8–13–1 (7–7–1)
January 30	at Brown		Meehan Auditorium • Providence, RI	Hanna Mandl	W 6–3	9–13–1 (8–7–1)
February 5	at Dartmouth		Thompson Arena • Hanover, NH	Hanna Mandl	W 4–3 ^{OT}	10–13–1 (9–7–1)
February 6	at Harvard		Bright-Landry Hockey Center • Allston, MA	Hanna Mandl	L 1–4	10–14–1 (9–8–1)
February 12	#10 Colgate		Ingalls Rink • New Haven, CT	Hanna Mandl	L 0–2	10–15–1 (9–9–1)
February 13	Cornell		Ingalls Rink • New Haven, CT	Hanna Mandl	L 2–4	10–16–1 (9–10–1)
February 19	at St. Lawrence		Appleton Arena • Canton, NY	Hanna Mandl	T 2–2 ^{OT}	10–16–2 (9–10–2)
February 20	at #5 Clarkson		Cheel Arena • Potsdam, NY	Hanna Mandl	L 2–3	10–17–2 (9–11–2)
*Non-conference game. ^{#}Rankings from USCHO.com Poll.
