= 2015–16 Mercyhurst Lakers women's ice hockey season =

CHA Regular Season Champions CHA Tournament Champions NCAA Division I Tournament, Lost in First Round to Wisconsin, 0-6
- Conference: 1st College Hockey America
- Home ice: Mercyhurst Ice Center

Record
- Overall: 19-11-5
- Conference: 14-3-3
- Home: 9-4-3
- Road: 8-7-2
- Neutral: 2-0-0

Coaches and captains
- Head coach: Michael Sisti (17th season)
- Assistant coaches: Louis Goulet; Delaney Collins
- Captain: Emily Janiga
- Alternate captain(s): Hannah Bale; J'Nai Mahadeo

The Mercyhurst Lakers represented Mercyhurst University in CHA women's ice hockey during the 2015-16 NCAA Division I women's ice hockey season. The Lakers were the regular season champions of the College Hockey America Conference (CHA), as well as the CHA Tournament Champions. They were defeated in the NCAA Championship Tournament by #2 Wisconsin.

== Standings ==
2015–16 College Hockey America standings
	Conference							Overall					
	GP	W	L	T	PTS	GF	GA	GP	W	L	T	GF	GA
Mercyhurst†*	20	14	3	3	31	55	26	35	19	11	5	92	74
Syracuse	20	14	4	2	30	56	28	36	19	14	3	96	77
Penn State	20	6	8	6	18	33	35	37	12	19	6	65	76
Robert Morris	20	7	9	4	18	52	57	38	17	16	9	108	97
Lindenwood	20	5	11	4	14	31	46	37	9	24	4	64	102
RIT	20	4	15	1	9	25	60	36	8	27	1	51	108
Championship: Mercyhurst † indicates conference regular season champion * indicates conference tournament champion Current rankings: USCHO.com Division I women's poll

- Rankings based on number of wins in the conference

== Offseason ==
- August 7: Emily Janiga earned her second consecutive invitation to the USA Hockey Women's National Festival in Lake Placid, New York. The festival shall determine the roster of the Under-22 team that shall compete in a three-game series versus the Canadian U22/Development Squad from Aug. 19-23 in Lake Placid.

=== Recruiting ===
Player	Position	Nationality	Notes
Lea Boreland	Forward	United States	Played with Detroit Honeybaked
Sarah Hine	Forward	Canada	Was with Stoney Creek Sabres
Rachael Smith	Forward	Canada	Played with Hine on Stoney Creek Sabres
Molly Blasen	Defense	United States	Played with Boreland and Stacey on Detroit Honeybaked
Nicole Collier	Defense	Canada	Third recruit from Stoney Creek Sabres
Samantha Fieseler	Defense	Canada	Gold medalist with 2014 Team Canada U18
Morgan Stacey	Defense	United States	Played with Blasen and Boreland on Detroit Honeybaked
Sarah McDonnell	Goaltender	Canada	Fourth recruit from Stoney Creek Sabres
Kerri St. Denis	Goaltender	United States	Acclaimed Goaltender with Assabet Valley Team

== Roster ==
=== 2015–16 Lakers ===
No.	Nat.	Player	Class	Pos	Height	DoB	Hometown	Previous team
2		Samantha Fieseler	Freshman	D	5' 6" (1.68 m)		Kelowna, British Columbia	Pursuit of Excellence Academy
4		Emily Janiga (C)	Senior	F	5' 10" (1.78 m)		East Aurora, New York	Nichols School
6		Taylor Accursi	Junior	F	5' 8" (1.73 m)		Ancaster, Ontario	Burlington Barracudas
7		Hannah Bale (A)	Senior	F	5' 11" (1.8 m)		Oakville, Ontario	Stoney Creek Jr. Sabres
10		Megan Whiddon	Junior	F	5' 5" (1.65 m)		Corona, California	National Sports Academy
11		Jennifer MacAskill	Sophomore	F	5' 5" (1.65 m)		Auld's Cove, Nova Scotia	Oakville Jr. Hornets
12		Molly Blasen	Freshman	D	5' 7" (1.7 m)		Okemos, Michigan	Honeybaked
13		Lea Boreland	Freshman	F	5' 6" (1.68 m)		Novi, Michigan	Honeybaked
14		Rachael Smith	Freshman	F	5' 8" (1.73 m)		Stoney Creek, Ontario	Stoney Creek Sabres
15		Paige Horton	Junior	D	5' 11" (1.8 m)		St. Thomas, Ontario	London Jr. Devilettes
16		Jenna Dingeldein	Senior	F	6' 1" (1.85 m)		Toronto, Ontario	Toronto Aeros
18		J'nai Mahadeo (A)	Senior	D	5' 8" (1.73 m)		Airdrie, Alberta	Edge School
19		Sarah Robello	Sophomore	F	5' 4" (1.63 m)		Las Vegas, Nevada	Boston Shamrocks
20		Kathy Donohue	Senior	F	5' 5" (1.65 m)		Rochester, New York	North American Hockey Academy
21		Callie Paddock	Sophomore	D	6' 1" (1.85 m)		Wawa, Ontario	St. Mary's Academy
22		Nicole Collier	Freshman	D	5' 6" (1.68 m)		Oakville, Ontario	Stoney Creek Sabres
23		Morgan Stacey	Freshman	F	5' 5" (1.65 m)		Commerce Township, Michigan	Honeybaked
24		Jaclyn Arbour	Senior	F	5' 9" (1.75 m)		South Setauket, New York	National Sports Academy
25		Jillian Skinner	Junior	D	5' 6" (1.68 m)		Markham, Ontario	Mississauga Jr. Chiefs
26		Sarah Hine	Freshman	F	5' 4" (1.63 m)		Hamilton, Ontario	Stoney Creek Sabres
27		Brooke Hartwick	Sophomore	F	5' 7" (1.7 m)		London, Ontario	Brampton Jr. Canadettes
28		Lauren Kilroy	Senior	D	5' 7" (1.7 m)		Cypress, California	North American Hockey Academy
29		Kerri St. Denis	Freshman	G	5' 7" (1.7 m)		Auburn, Maine	St. Paul's School
34		Sarah McDonnell	Freshman	G	5' 5" (1.65 m)		Oakville, Ontario	Stoney Creek Sabres
37		Jessica Convery	Sophomore	G	5' 7" (1.7 m)		Commerce Township, Michigan	Honeybaked

== Schedule ==
Date	Opponent^{#}	Rank^{#}	Site	Decision	Result	Record
Regular Season
October 2	at #7 Quinnipiac*		TD Bank Sports Center • Hamden, CT	Sarah McDonnell	T 3–3 ^{OT}	0–0–1
October 3	at #7 Quinnipiac*		TD Bank Sports Center • Hamden, CT	Jessica Convery	L 1–2	0–1–1
October 16	at Northeastern*		Matthews Arena • Boston, MA	Jessica Convery	L 4–5	0–2–1
October 17	at Northeastern*		Matthews Arena • Boston, MA	Kerri St. Denis	L 3–7	0–3–1
October 23	Princeton*		Mercyhurst Ice Center • Erie, PA	Jessica Convery	L 2–3	0–4–1
October 24	Princeton*		Mercyhurst Ice Center • Erie, PA	Sarah McDonnell	L 1–2	0–5–1
October 30	RIT		Mercyhurst Ice Center • Erie, PA	Sarah McDonnell	W 5–0	1–5–1 (1–0–0)
October 31	RIT		Mercyhurst Ice Center • Erie, PA	Sarah McDonnell	W 4–3 ^{OT}	2–5–1 (2–0–0)
November 6	at Penn State		Pegula Ice Arena • University Park, PA	Sarah McDonnell	W 1–0	3–5–1 (3–0–0)
November 7	at Penn State		Pegula Ice Arena • University Park, PA	Sarah McDonnell	T 1–1 ^{OT}	3–5–2 (3–0–1)
November 13	Lindenwood		Mercyhurst Ice Center • Erie, PA	Sarah McDonnell	W 3–2	4–5–2 (4–0–1)
November 14	Lindenwood		Mercyhurst Ice Center • Erie, PA	Sarah McDonnell	W 2–1	5–5–2 (5–0–1)
November 20	Cornell*		Mercyhurst Ice Center • Erie, PA	Sarah McDonnell	W 5–1	6–5–2
November 21	Cornell*		Mercyhurst Ice Center • Erie, PA	Sarah McDonnell	L 1–6	6–6–2
November 24	at #10 Colgate*		Starr Rink • Hamilton, NY	Sarah McDonnell	W 4–2	7–6–2
November 25	at #10 Colgate*		Starr Rink • Hamilton, NY	Jessica Convery	L 0–3	7–7–2
December 4	Robert Morris		Mercyhurst Ice Center • Erie, PA	Sarah McDonnell	W 4–1	8–7–2 (6–0–1)
December 5	Robert Morris		Mercyhurst Ice Center • Erie, PA	Sarah McDonnell	T 4–4 ^{OT}	8–7–3 (6–0–2)
January 2, 2016	Rensselaer*		Mercyhurst Ice Center • Erie, PA	Sarah McDonnell	W 3–1	9–7–3
January 3	Rensselaer*		Mercyhurst Ice Center • Erie, PA	Sarah McDonnell	T 2–2 ^{OT}	9–7–4
January 15	at Syracuse		Oncenter War Memorial Arena • Syracuse, NY	Sarah McDonnell	L 0–2	9–8–4 (6–1–2)
January 16	at Syracuse		Oncenter War Memorial Arena • Syracuse, NY	Sarah McDonnell	W 3–1	10–8–4 (7–1–2)
January 22	at Lindenwood		Lindenwood Ice Arena • Wentzville, MO	Sarah McDonnell	W 3–1	11–8–4 (8–1–2)
January 23	at Lindenwood		Lindenwood Ice Arena • Wentzville, MO	Sarah McDonnell	L 0–1	11–9–4 (8–2–2)
January 29	Syracuse		Mercyhurst Ice Center • Erie, PA	Sarah McDonnell	W 4–1	12–9–4 (9–2–2)
January 30	Syracuse		Mercyhurst Ice Center • Erie, PA	Sarah McDonnell	L 1–2 ^{OT}	12–10–4 (9–3–2)
February 5	at Robert Morris		RMU Island Sport Center • Neville Township, PA	Jessica Convery	W 4–0	13–10–4 (10–3–2)
February 6	at Robert Morris		RMU Island Sport Center • Neville Township, PA	Jessica Convery	W 6–3	14–10–4 (11–3–2)
February 12	at RIT		Gene Polisseni Center • Rochester, NY	Sarah McDonnell	W 4–1	15–10–4 (12–3–2)
February 13	at RIT		Gene Polisseni Center • Rochester, NY	Sarah McDonnell	W 2–0	16–10–4 (13–3–2)
February 19	Penn State		Mercyhurst Ice Center • Erie, PA	Sarah McDonnell	W 2–1	17–10–4 (14–3–2)
February 20	Penn State		Mercyhurst Ice Center • Erie, PA	Sarah McDonnell	T 2–2 ^{OT}	17–10–5 (14–3–3)
CHA Tournament
March 4	vs. Robert Morris*		HarborCenter • Buffalo, NY (Semifinal Game)	Sarah McDonnell	W 4–2	18–10–5
March 5	vs. Syracuse*		HarborCenter • Buffalo, NY (CHA Championship Game)	Sarah McDonnell	W 4–3 ^{OT}	19–10–5
NCAA Tournament
March 12	at #2 Wisconsin*		LaBahn Arena • Madison, WI (NCAA Quarterfinal Game)	Sarah McDonnell	L 0–6	19–11–5
*Non-conference game. ^{#}Rankings from USCHO.com Poll.

== Awards and honors ==
- Rachael Smith, CHA Rookie of the Year
- Sarah McDonnell, CHA Goaltender Award
- Mike Sisti CHA Coach of the Year
- J'Nai Mahadeo, D, All-CHA Second Team
- Rachael Smith, F, All-CHA Rookie Team
- Molly Blasen, D, All-CHA Rookie Team
- Sarah McDonnell, G, All-CHA Rookie Team
