= 2015–16 Colgate Raiders women's ice hockey season =

- Conference: 4th ECAC
- Home ice: Starr Rink

Rankings
- USCHO.com: 8th
- USA Today/USA Hockey Magazine: 8th

Record
- Overall: 22–9–7
- Home: 12–5–3
- Road: 10–3–4
- Neutral: 0–1–0

Coaches and captains
- Head coach: Greg Fargo
- Assistant coaches: Sophie LeClerc; Stefan DeCosse
- Captain(s): Katelyn Parker; Cat Quirion; Annika Zalewski

The Colgate Raiders represented Colgate University in ECAC women's ice hockey during the 2015–16 NCAA Division I women's ice hockey season.

== Offseason ==
- April 15: Incoming Freshman Shae Labbe was invited to Team Canada's Strength and Conditioning Camp.

=== Recruiting ===
Player	Position	Nationality	Notes
Megan DuBois	Goaltender	United States	Attended Shattuck-St. Mary's
Jessie Eldridge	Forward	Canada	Played for the Toronto Jr. Aeros
Chelsea Jacques	Defense	United States	Member of Madison Capitals
Shae Labbe	Forward	Canada	Member of Team Canada U18
Bailey Larson	Forward	United States	Former member of Team USA U18
Shannon Ormel	Forward	Canada	Member of Team Manitoba
Julia Vandyk	Goaltender	Canada	Played with Team Ontario
Olivia Zafuto	Defense	United States	Member of Niagara Jr. Purple Eagles

== Roster ==
=== 2015-16 Raiders ===
No.	Nat.	Player	Class	Pos	Height	DoB	Hometown	Previous team
3		Olivia Zafuto	Freshman	D	5' 6" (1.68 m)		Niagara Falls, New York	Niagara Jr. Purple Eagles
4		Kaila Pinkney	Sophomore	D	5' 9" (1.75 m)		Denfield, Ontario	Team Canada U18
6		Shelby Perry	Sophomore	F	5' 8" (1.73 m)		Elginburg, Ontario	Kingston Ice Wolves
7		Megan Sullivan	Sophomore	F	5' 4" (1.63 m)		Toronto, Ontario	Whitby Jr. Wolves
9		Jessie Eldridge	Freshman	F	5' 9" (1.75 m)		Barrie, Ontario	Toronto Jr. Aeros
10		Ellie DeCaprio	Sophomore	F	5' 4" (1.63 m)		Wellesley, Massachusetts	Rivers School
11		Breanne Wilson-Bennett	Sophomore	F	5' 4" (1.63 m)		Markham, Ontario	Team Canada U18
12		Shae Labbe	Freshman	F	5' 6" (1.68 m)		Calgary, Alberta	Team Canada U18
15		Annika Zalewski (C)	Sophomore	F	5' 10" (1.78 m)		New Hartford, New York	Buffalo Bisons
16		Katelyn Parker (C)	Senior	F	5' 5" (1.65 m)		Bellingham, Washington	Gilmour Academy
17		Kayla Haus	Junior	F	5' 7" (1.7 m)		Kasilof, Alaska	North American Hockey Academy
18		Nicole Gass	Senior	D	5' 8" (1.73 m)		Cookshire-Eaton, Quebec	John Abbott
19		Shannon Ormel	Freshman	F	5' 7" (1.7 m)		Winnipeg, Manitoba	Team Manitoba
21		Lauren Wildfang	Sophomore	D	5' 4" (1.63 m)		Waterdown, Ontario	Team Canada U18
22		Chelsea Jacques	Freshman	D	5' 5" (1.65 m)		Calumet, Michigan	Madison Capitols
25		Hannah Rastrick	Junior	D	5' 8" (1.73 m)		Toronto, Ontario	Toronto Jr. Aeros
26		Cat Querion (C)	Junior	D	5' 1" (1.55 m)		Lac-Megantic, Quebec	Stanstead College
27		Meghan Brennan	Junior	F	5' 9" (1.75 m)		Ottawa, Ontario	Nepean Jr. Wildcats
29		Megan DuBois	Freshman	G	5' 5" (1.65 m)		Hudson, Wisconsin	Shattuck-St. Mary's
33		Julia Vandyk	Freshman	G	5' 8" (1.73 m)		Cambridge, Ontario	Cambridge Jr. Rivulettes
35		Ashlynne Rando	Senior	G	5' 9" (1.75 m)		Sugarland, Texas	North American Hockey Academy
61		Bailey Larson	Freshman	F	5' 2" (1.57 m)		Sycamore, Illinois	Team USA U18

== Schedule ==
Date	Opponent^{#}	Rank^{#}	Site	Decision	Result	Record
Regular Season
October 2	Robert Morris*		Starr Rink • Hamilton, NY	Ashlynne Rando	W 5–3	1–0–0
October 3	Robert Morris*		Starr Rink • Hamilton, NY	Ashlynne Rando	W 6–0	2–0–0
October 17	at Providence*		Schneider Arena • Providence, RI	Ashlynne Rando	W 6–2	3–0–0
October 18	at Connecticut*		Freitas Ice Forum • Storrs, CT	Ashlynne Rando	T 3–3 ^{OT}	3–0–1
October 23	at Merrimack*		Volpe Complex • North Andover, MA	Julia Vandyk	W 4–3	4–0–1
October 24	at Merrimack*		Volpe Complex • North Andover, MA	Ashlynne Rando	L 2–4	4–1–1
October 30	Union		Starr Rink • Hamilton, NY	Ashlynne Rando	T 2–2 ^{OT}	4–1–2 (0–0–1)
October 31	Rensselaer		Starr Rink • Hamilton, NY	Julia Vandyk	T 3–3 ^{OT}	4–1–3 (0–0–2)
November 6	at #7 Quinnipiac		TD Bank Sports Center • Hamden, CT	Ashlynne Rando	T 0–0 ^{OT}	4–1–4 (0–0–3)
November 7	at #10 Princeton		Hobey Baker Memorial Rink • Princeton, NJ	Ashlynne Rando	L 2–3	4–2–4 (0–1–3)
November 13	at RIT*		Gene Polisseni Center • Rochester, NY	Ashlynne Rando	W 3–2	5–2–4
November 14	RIT*		Starr Rink • Hamilton, NY	Julia Vandyk	W 3–1	6–2–4
November 17	at Cornell		Lynah Rink • Ithaca, NY	Ashlynne Rando	T 3–3 ^{OT}	6–2–5 (0–1–4)
November 20	at Syracuse	#10	Starr Rink • Hamilton, NY	Julia Vandyk	W 2–1	7–2–5
November 24	Mercyhurst*	#10	Starr Rink • Hamilton, NY	Ashlynne Rando	L 2–4	7–3–5
November 25	Mercyhurst*	#10	Starr Rink • Hamilton, NY	Julia Vandyk	W 3–0	8–3–5
December 4	at #5 Clarkson		Cheel Arena • Potsdam, NY	Julia Vandyk	W 4–3 ^{OT}	9–3–5 (1–1–4)
December 5	at St. Lawrence		Appleton Arena • Canton, NY	Ashlynne Rando	W 2–1	10–3–5 (2–1–4)
January 4, 2016	at Syracuse*	#10	Tennity Ice Skating Pavilion • Syracuse, NY	Julia Vandyk	T 2–2 ^{OT}	10–3–6
January 8	at Dartmouth	#10	Thompson Arena • Hanover, NH	Ashlynne Rando	W 4–2	11–3–6 (3–1–4)
January 9	at Harvard	#10	Bright-Landry Hockey Center • Allston, MA	Ashlynne Rando	L 2–6	11–4–6 (3–2–4)
January 12	Cornell		Starr Rink • Hamilton, NY	Julia Vandyk	W 4–3	12–4–6 (4–2–4)
January 15	Brown		Starr Rink • Hamilton, NY	Julia Vandyk	W 6–2	13–4–6 (5–2–4)
January 16	Yale		Starr Rink • Hamilton, NY	Julia Vandyk	W 4–3	14–4–6 (6–2–4)
January 22	St. Lawrence	#10	Starr Rink • Hamilton, NY	Julia Vandyk	T 1–1 ^{OT}	14–4–7 (6–2–5)
January 23	#5 Clarkson	#10	Starr Rink • Hamilton, NY	Julia Vandyk	L 2–3	14–5–7 (6–3–5)
January 29	at Rensselaer	#10	Houston Field House • Troy, NY	Julia Vandyk	W 5–3	15–5–7 (7–3–5)
January 30	at Union	#10	Achilles Center • Schenectady, NY	Ashlynne Rando	W 1–0	16–5–7 (8–3–5)
February 5	#9 Princeton	#10	Starr Rink • Hamilton, NY	Julia Vandyk	L 2–4	16–6–7 (8–4–5)
February 6	#4 Quinnipiac	#10	Starr Rink • Hamilton, NY	Ashlynne Rando	W 3–2	17–6–7 (9–4–5)
February 12	at Yale	#10	Ingalls Rink • New Haven, CT	Ashlynne Rando	W 2–0	18–6–7 (10–4–5)
February 13	at Brown	#10	Meehan Auditorium • Providence, RI	Julia Vandyk	W 2–0	19–6–7 (11–4–5)
February 19	Harvard	#10	Starr Rink • Hamilton, NY	Ashlynne Rando	L 2–3	19–7–7 (11–5–5)
February 20	Dartmouth	#10	Starr Rink • Hamilton, NY	Ashlynne Rando	W 1–0	20–7–7 (12–5–5)
ECAC Tournament
February 26	Harvard*	#9	Starr Rink • Hamilton, NY (Quarterfinals, Game 1)	Ashlynne Rando	W 4–1	21–7–7
February 27	Harvard*	#9	Starr Rink • Hamilton, NY (Quarterfinals, Game 2)	Ashlynne Rando	L 1–4	21–8–7
February 28	Harvard*	#9	Starr Rink • Hamilton, NY (Quarterfinals, Game 3)	Ashlynne Rando	W 3–2 ^{OT}	22–8–7
March 5	vs. #5 Clarkson*	#7	TD Bank Sports Center • Hamden, CT (Semifinal Game)	Ashlynne Rando	L 2–5	22–9–7
*Non-conference game. ^{#}Rankings from USCHO.com Poll.
