= 2015–16 Clarkson Golden Knights women's ice hockey season =

NCAA Semifinals, L 2–3 ^{OT} vs. Boston College
- Conference: 2nd ECAC
- Home ice: Cheel Arena

Rankings
- USCHO.com: #4
- USA Today/USA Hockey Magazine: #4

Record
- Overall: 30–5–5
- Home: 17–2–1
- Road: 12–2–4
- Neutral: 1–1–0

Coaches and captains
- Head coach: Matt Desrosiers
- Assistant coaches: Britni Smith; Meghan Duggan
- Captain: Shannon MacAulay
- Alternate captain(s): Erin Ambrose; Renata Fast; Olivia Howe; Cayley Mercer

The Clarkson Golden Knights women's ice hockey program represented Clarkson University during the 2015–16 NCAA Division I women's ice hockey season. The Golden Knights entered the season as the defending ECAC regular season champions.

The Golden Knights finished second in the ECAC. In the ECAC tournament they advanced to the championship game before falling to regular season champion Quinnipiac. Their performance was still enough to earn a fourth-straight at-large the NCAA tournament bid. In the quarterfinals, they upset Quinnipiac, sending them to their second ever Frozen Four. In the semifinals, they fell in overtime to an undefeated and untied Boston College team.

== Offseason ==
=== Recruiting ===
Player	Position	Nationality	Notes
Loren Gabel	Forward	Canada	Played for Oakville Jr Hornets (PWHL)
Emma Keenan	Defense	Canada	Played for Okanagan Hockey Academy
Kelly Mariani	Forward	Canada	Played for Mississauga Jr Chiefs (PWHL)
Rhyen McGill	Forward	Canada	Played for Whitby Jr Wolves (PWHL); Winner of silver medal at 2015 IIHF U18 Women's Worlds
Josiane Pozzebon	Defense	Canada	Played for Napean Jr Wildcats (PWHL); Winner of silver medal at 2015 IIHF U18 Women's Worlds
Cassidy Vinkle	Forward	Canada	Played for Whitby Jr Wolves (PWHL)

== Roster ==
No.	Nat.	Player	Class	Pos	Height	DoB	Hometown	Previous team
2		Corie Jacobson	Junior	F	5' 6" (1.68 m)	1995-05-28	Warren, Ontario	Northbay Ice Boltz
4		Shannon MacAulay (C)	Senior	F	5' 11" (1.8 m)	1994-06-22	Mount Herbert, Prince Edward Island	Warner Warriors
7		Jessica Gillham	Junior	F	5' 7" (1.7 m)	1995-03-15	Uxbridge, Ontario	Aurora Panthers
8		Lauren Lefler	Sophomore	F	5' 8" (1.73 m)	1996-06-26	Windsor, Ontario	Bluewater Jr. Hawks
9		Genevieve Bannon	Junior	F	5' 8" (1.73 m)	1995-02-03	Candiac, Quebec	Ontario Hockey Academy
12		Renata Fast (A)	Senior	D	5' 7" (1.7 m)	1994-10-06	Burlington, Ontario	Burlington Jr. Barracudas
14		Savannah Harmon	Sophomore	D	5' 3" (1.6 m)	1995-10-27	Downers Grove, Illinois	Boston Shamrocks
15		Amanda Titus	Sophomore	F	5' 6" (1.68 m)	1996-10-06	Stittsville, Ontario	Ottawa Jr. Senators
16		Olivia Howe (A)	Senior	F	5' 10" (1.78 m)	1994-01-17	Moose Jaw, Saskatchewan	Notre Dame Hounds
18		Cayley Mercer (A)	Junior (RS)	F	5' 8" (1.73 m)	1994-01-18	Exeter, Ontario	Bluewater Jr. Hawks
19		Loren Gabel	Freshman	F	5' 4" (1.63 m)	1997-07-24	Kitchener, Ontario	Oakville Jr. Hornets
21		Emma Keenan	Freshman	D	5' 7" (1.7 m)	1997-11-26	Calgary, Alberta	Okanagan Hockey Academy
22		Cassidy Vinkle	Freshman	F	5' 8" (1.73 m)	1997-08-28	Belleville, Ontario	Whitby Jr. Wolves
23		Erin Ambrose (A)	Senior	D	5' 5" (1.65 m)	1994-04-30	Keswick, Ontario	Toronto Jr. Aeros
24		Katelyn Fournier	Sophomore	F	5' 7" (1.7 m)	1996-03-25	Ottawa, Ontario	Ottawa Jr. Senators
25		Rhyen McGill	Freshman	F	5' 8" (1.73 m)	1997-10-28	Whitby, Ontario	Whitby Jr. Wolves
26		Kelly Mariani	Freshman	F	5' 3" (1.6 m)	1997-03-03	Mississauga, Ontario	Mississauga Jr. Chiefs
27		Brielle Bellerive	Sophomore	F	5' 9" (1.75 m)	1996-12-01	North Vancouver, British Columbia	Okanagan Hockey Academy
28		Josiane Pozzebon	Freshman	D	5' 5" (1.65 m)	1997-03-25	Bourget, Ontario	Nepean Jr. Wildcats
33		Mckenzie Johnson	Junior	G	5' 7" (1.7 m)	1995-06-01	Eden Prairie, Minnesota	Eden Prairie H.S.
35		Shea Tiley	Sophomore	G	5' 10" (1.78 m)	1996-12-02	Owen Sound, Ontario	Kitchener-Waterloo Rangers

== Schedule ==
Date	Opponent^{#}	Rank^{#}	Site	Decision	Result	Record
Regular Season
September 26	McGill*	#5	Cheel Arena • Potsdam, NY (exhibition)	Shea Tiley	W 4–1	0–0–0
October 2	St. Lawrence*	#5	Cheel Arena • Potsdam, NY	Shea Tiley	W 4–0	1–0–0
October 3	at St. Lawrence*	#5	Appleton Arena • Canton, NY	Shea Tiley	W 3–2	2–0–0
October 6	at Syracuse*	#5	Tennity Ice Skating Pavilion • Syracuse, NY	Shea Tiley	W 3–1	3–0–0
October 9	at Vermont*	#5	Gutterson Fieldhouse • Burlington, VT	Shea Tiley	W 5–0	4–0–0
October 10	Vermont*	#5	Cheel Arena • Potsdam, NY	McKenzie Johnson	W 3–0	5–0–0
October 16	at #9 Boston University*	#4	Walter Brown Arena • Boston, MA	Shea Tiley	W 4–2	6–0–0
October 17	at #9 Boston University*	#4	Walter Brown Arena • Boston, MA	Shea Tiley	W 4–1	7–0–0
October 23	New Hampshire*	#4	Cheel Arena • Potsdam, NY	Shea Tiley	W 4–2	8–0–0
October 24	New Hampshire*	#4	Cheel Arena • Potsdam, NY	McKenzie Johnson	W 6–4	9–0–0
October 30	at #8 Harvard	#4	Bright-Landry Hockey Center • Allston, MA	Shea Tiley	T 0–0 ^{OT}	9–0–1 (0–0–1)
October 31	at #10 Dartmouth	#4	Thompson Arena • Hanover, NH	Shea Tiley	T 3–3 ^{OT}	9–0–2 (0–0–2)
November 6	at Union	#4	Achilles Rink • Schenectady, NY	Shea Tiley	W 6–0	10–0–2 (1–0–2)
November 7	at RPI	#4	Houston Field House • Troy, NY	Shea Tiley	L 1–2	10–1–2 (1–1–2)
November 10	Syracuse*	#4	Cheel Arena • Potsdam, NY	Shea Tiley	W 5–1	11–1–2
November 13	Connecticut*	#4	Cheel Arena • Potsdam, NY	Shea Tiley	W 3–1	12–1–2
November 14	Connecticut*	#4	Cheel Arena • Potsdam, NY	Shea Tiley	W 3–2	13–1–2
November 20	#8 Quinnipiac	#4	Cheel Arena • Potsdam, NY	Shea Tiley	L 0–3	13–2–2 (1–2–2)
November 21	#10 Princeton	#4	Cheel Arena • Potsdam, NY	Shea Tiley	W 3–0	14–2–2 (2–2–2)
December 4	Colgate	#5	Cheel Arena • Potsdam, NY	Shea Tiley	L 3–4 ^{OT}	14–3–2 (2–3–2)
December 5	Cornell	#5	Cheel Arena • Potsdam, NY	Shea Tiley	W 4–0	15–3–2 (3–3–2)
January 8	at Yale	#5	Ingalls Rink • New Haven, CT	Shea Tiley	W 5–2	16–3–2 (4–3–2)
January 9	at Brown	#5	Meehan Auditorium • Providence, RI	Shea Tiley	W 7–0	17–3–2 (5–3–2)
January 15	Dartmouth	#5	Cheel Arena • Potsdam, NY	Shea Tiley	W 1–0	18–3–2 (6–3–2)
January 16	#8 Harvard	#5	Cheel Arena • Potsdam, NY	Shea Tiley	W 5–2	19–3–2 (7–3–2)
January 22	at Cornell	#5	Lynah Rink • Ithaca, NY	Shea Tiley	T 2–2 ^{OT}	19–3–3 (7–3–3)
January 23	at #10 Colgate	#5	Starr Arena • Hamilton, NY	Shea Tiley	W 3–2	20–3–3 (8–3–3)
January 28	at St. Lawrence	#5	Appleton Arena • Canton, NY	Shea Tiley	W 6–1	21–3–3 (9–3–3)
January 30	St. Lawrence	#5	Cheel Arena • Potsdam, NY	Shea Tiley	T 2–2 ^{OT}	21–3–4 (9–3–4)
February 5	RPI	#5	Cheel Arena • Potsdam, NY	Shea Tiley	W 9–1	22–3–4 (10–3–4)
February 6	Union	#5	Cheel Arena • Potsdam, NY	McKenzie Johnson	W 4–1	23–3–4 (11–3–4)
February 12	at #8 Princeton	#5	Hobey Baker Memorial Rink • Princeton, NJ	Shea Tiley	W 2–1	24–3–4 (12–3–4)
February 13	at #4 Quinnipiac	#5	TD Bank Sports Center • Hamden, CT	Shea Tiley	T 2–2 ^{OT}	24–3–5 (12–3–5)
February 19	Brown	#5	Cheel Arena • Potsdam, NY	Shea Tiley	W 7–0	25–3–5 (13–3–5)
February 20	Yale	#5	Cheel Arena • Potsdam, NY	Shea Tiley	W 3–2	26–3–5 (14–3–5)
ECAC Hockey Tournament
February 26	Cornell*	#5	Cheel Arena • Potsdam, NY (Quarterfinals Game 1)	Shea Tiley	W 2–0	27–3–5
February 27	Cornell*	#5	Cheel Arena • Potsdam, NY (Quarterfinals Game 2)	Shea Tiley	W 5–2	28–3–5
March 5	vs. #7 Colgate*	#5	TD Bank Sports Center • Hamden, CT (Semifinals)	Shea Tiley	W 5–2	29–3–5
March 6	at #4 Quinnipiac*	#5	TD Bank Sports Center • Hamden, CT (Championship)	Shea Tiley	L 0–1	29–4–5
NCAA Tournament
March 12	at #4 Quinnipiac*	#5	TD Bank Sports Center • Hamden, CT (Quarterfinals)	Shea Tiley	W 1–0	30–4–5
March 18	vs. #1 Boston College*	#5	Whittemore Center • Durham, NH (Semifinals)	Shea Tiley	L 2–3 ^{OT}	30–5–5
*Non-conference game. ^{#}Rankings from USCHO.com Poll.

== Awards and honors ==
- Erin Ambrose – Second Team All-USCHO.com, ECAC Hockey All-Tournament Team, ECAC Hockey First Team All-Star, ECAC Hockey Player of the Week (1/12), ECAC Hockey weekly Honor Roll (3/2)
- Genevieve Bannon – ECAC Hockey weekly Honor Roll (11/3, 1/19, 1/26, 2/21)
- Renata Fast – ECAC Hockey Third Team All-Star
- Loren Gabel – ECAC Hockey All-Rookie Team, ECAC Hockey Rookie of the Month (February), ECAC Hockey Rookie of the Week (2/21), ECAC Hockey weekly Honor Roll (10/27, 11/17, 11/23, 1/19)
- Savannah Harmon – ECAC Hockey weekly Honor Roll (10/13)
- Olivia Howe – ECAC Hockey Second Team All-Star, ECAC Hockey Player of the Week (10/20, 2/1), ECAC Hockey weekly Honor Roll (11/17, 11/23)
- McKenzie Johnson – ECAC Hockey weekly Honor Roll (10/13)
- Shannon MacAulay – ECAC Hockey All-Tournament Team
- Kelly Mariani – ECAC Hockey weekly Honor Roll (10/20, 2/1)
- Rhyen McGill – ECAC Hockey Rookie of the Week (10/13, 1/26), ECAC Hockey weekly Honor Roll (10/6)
- Cayley Mercer – Third Team All-USCHO.com, ECAC Hockey First Team All-Star, ECAC Hockey Player of the Month (October), ECAC Hockey Player of the Week (10/6, 10/27)
- Josiane Pozzebon – ECAC Hockey weekly Honor Roll (10/20, 2/1)
- Shea Tiley – ECAC Hockey Goaltender of the Month (October), ECAC Hockey Goaltender of the Week (10/20), ECAC Hockey weekly Honor Roll (10/6, 10/27, 11/3, 11/17, 11/23, 1/12, 1/19, 1/26, 2/1, 2/21, 3/2)
- Cassidy Vinkle – ECAC Hockey weekly Honor Roll (1/12)
