= 2015–16 Syracuse Orange women's ice hockey season =

- Conference: 2nd College Hockey America
- Home ice: Tennity Ice Skating Pavilion

Record
- Overall: 19-14-3
- Conference: 14-4-2
- Home: 9-5-2
- Road: 9-8-1
- Neutral: 1-1-0

Coaches and captains
- Head coach: Paul Flanagan 8th season
- Assistant coaches: Alison Domenico; Brendon Knight
- Captain: Nicole Ferrera
- Alternate captain(s): Melissa Piacentini; Nicole Renault; Larissa Martyniuk

The Syracuse Orange women represented Syracuse University in CHA women's ice hockey during the 2015-16 NCAA Division I women's ice hockey season. The Orange finished conference play in second place, and advanced to the CHA Tournament Final, before losing to the Mercyhurst 4-3 in overtime. It was the second consecutive year that the Orange took the championship into overtime. Senior Melissa Piacentini was named CHA Player of the Year, while Nicole Renault was the CHA Defenseman of the Year.

== Offseason ==
- July 8: Fourteen players were named to the CHA All-Academic Team.
- August 13: 2015 graduate Allison LaCombe signed a professional contract with the Vienna Sabres of EWHL.

=== Recruiting ===
Player	Position	Nationality	Notes
Lindsay Eastwood	Defense	Canada	Played with Team Canada U18
Allie Munroe	Defense	Canada	Competed with New Hampton
Karleigh Scully	Forward	Canada	Competed with Nepean Jr. Wildcats alongside Lindsay Eastwood
Sarah Stuehr	Forward	United States	Attended Warner Hockey School
Maddi Welch	Goaltender	United States	Played for Niagara Jr. Purple Eagles

== Standings ==
2015–16 College Hockey America standings
	Conference							Overall					
	GP	W	L	T	PTS	GF	GA	GP	W	L	T	GF	GA
Mercyhurst†*	20	14	3	3	31	55	26	35	19	11	5	92	74
Syracuse	20	14	4	2	30	56	28	36	19	14	3	96	77
Penn State	20	6	8	6	18	33	35	37	12	19	6	65	76
Robert Morris	20	7	9	4	18	52	57	38	17	16	9	108	97
Lindenwood	20	5	11	4	14	31	46	37	9	24	4	64	102
RIT	20	4	15	1	9	25	60	36	8	27	1	51	108
Championship: Mercyhurst † indicates conference regular season champion * indicates conference tournament champion Current rankings: USCHO.com Division I women's poll

- Rankings based on number of wins in the conference

== Roster ==
=== 2015–16 Orange ===
No.	Nat.	Player	Class	Pos	Height	DoB	Hometown	Previous team
2		Nicole Renault (A)	Senior	D	5' 8" (1.73 m)		Plymouth, Michigan	Little Caesar's U19
4		Lindsay Eastwood	Freshman	D	6' 1" (1.85 m)		Kanata, Ontario	Team Canada U18
6		Danielle Leslie	Senior	D	5' 5" (1.65 m)		Winnipeg, Manitoba	Team Manitoba U18
7		Jessica Sibley	Junior	F	5' 5" (1.65 m)		Luseland, Saskatchewan	Team Saskatchewan U18
8		Stephanie Grossi	Sophomore	F	5' 2" (1.57 m)		Winnipeg, Manitoba	Team Manitoba U18
9		Allie Munroe	Freshman	D	5' 7" (1.7 m)		Yarmouth, Nova Scotia	New Hampton
10		Morgan Blank	Junior	F	5' 3" (1.6 m)		Fort Mitchell, Kentucky	Pittsburgh Penguins Elite
11		Emily Costales	Sophomore	F	5' 4" (1.63 m)		Vancouver, British Columbia	Team British Columbia U18
12		Nicole Ferrera (C)	Senior (RS)	F	5' 4" (1.63 m)		Winthrop, Massachusetts	Assabet Valley U19
14		Melissa Piacentini (A)	Senior	F	5' 2" (1.57 m)		South Weymouth, Massachusetts	Assabet Valley U19
15		Sarah Stuehr	Freshman	F	5' 4" (1.63 m)		Westwood, Massachusetts	Warner Hockey School
17		Larissa Martyniuk (A)	Junior	D	5' 6" (1.68 m)		Winnipeg, Manitoba	Team Manitoba U18
19		Dakota Derrer	Sophomore	D	5' 7" (1.7 m)		Mancelona, Michigan	Traverse City-St. Francis
20		Alysha Burriss	Sophomore	F	5' 6" (1.68 m)		Napanee, Ontario	Team Ontario Blue U18
22		Laurence Porlier	Junior	F	5' 9" (1.75 m)		Maria, Quebec	Brewster Academy
23		Megan Quinn	Sophomore	D	5' 9" (1.75 m)		Belleville, Ontario	Team Ontario Red U18
27		Heather Schwartz	Junior	F	5' 7" (1.7 m)		Naugatuck, Connecticut	Boston Shamrocks
29		Abbey Miller	Sophomore	G	5' 8" (1.73 m)		Anoka, Minnesota	Benilde-St. Margaret's
30		Maddi Welch	Freshman	G	5' 7" (1.7 m)		East Amherst, New York	Niagara Jr. Purple Eagles
33		Jenn Gilligan	Senior	G	5' 9" (1.75 m)		Maple Ridge, British Columbia	UNH

== Schedule ==
Date	Opponent^{#}	Rank^{#}	Site	Decision	Result	Record
Regular Season
October 6	#5 Clarkson*		Tennity Ice Skating Pavilion • Syracuse, NY	Jenn Gilligan	L 1–3	0–1–0
October 9	at Northeastern*		Matthews Arena • Boston, MA	Jenn Gilligan	L 4–5	0–2–0
October 10	at New Hampshire*		Whittemore Center • Durham, NH	Jenn Gilligan	W 3–2	1–2–0
October 17	at Connecticut*		Freitas Ice Forum • Storrs, CT	Maddi Welch	L 3–4	1–3–0
October 18	at Providence*		Schneider Arena • Providence, RI	Jenn Gilligan	W 4–0	2–3–0
October 21	RIT		Tennity Ice Skating Pavilion • Syracuse, NY	Jenn Gilligan	W 7–1	3–3–0 (1–0–0)
October 24	at St. Lawrence*		Appleton Arena • Canton, NY	Jenn Gilligan	L 2–3	3–4–0
October 30	at Robert Morris		RMU Island Sports Center • Neville Township, PA	Jenn Gilligan	W 4–3 ^{OT}	4–4–0 (2–0–0)
October 31	at Robert Morris		RMU Island Sports Center • Neville Township, PA	Jenn Gilligan	L 0–2	4–5–0 (2–1–0)
November 6	at Lindenwood		Lindenwood Ice Arena • Wentzville, MO	Jenn Gilligan	W 3–1	5–5–0 (3–1–0)
November 7	at Lindenwood		Lindenwood Ice Arena • Wentzville, MO	Jenn Gilligan	T 1–1 ^{OT}	5–5–1 (3–1–1)
November 10	at #4 Clarkson*		Cheel Arena • Potsdam, NY	Jenn Gilligan	L 1–5	5–6–1
November 14	#4 Cornell*		Oncenter War Memorial Arena • Syracuse, NY	Jenn Gilligan	L 2–5	5–7–1
November 18	at RIT		Gene Polisseni Center • Rochester, NY	Jenn Gilligan	W 5–1	6–7–1 (4–1–1)
November 20	at Colgate*		Starr Rink • Hamilton, NY	Jenn Gilligan	L 1–2	6–8–1
November 27	#9 North Dakota*		Oncenter War Memorial Arena • Syracuse, NY	Jenn Gilligan	L 0–3	6–9–1
November 28	#9 North Dakota*		Tennity Ice Skating Pavilion • Syracuse, NY	Abbey Miller	W 5–2	7–9–1
December 4	Penn State		Tennity Ice Skating Pavilion • Syracuse, NY	Jenn Gilligan	W 3–1	8–9–1 (5–1–1)
December 5	Penn State		Tennity Ice Skating Pavilion • Syracuse, NY	Jenn Gilligan	W 1–1 ^{OT}	8–9–2 (5–1–2)
December 10	#2 Boston College*		Tennity Ice Skating Pavilion • Syracuse, NY	Jenn Gilligan	W 2–7	8–10–2
January 4, 2016	#10 Colgate*		Tennity Ice Skating Pavilion • Syracuse, NY	Jenn Gilligan	T 2–2 ^{OT}	8–10–3
January 12	at Union*		Achilles Center • Schenectady, NY	Jenn Gilligan	W 4–0	9–10–3
January 15	Mercyhurst		Oncenter War Memorial Arena • Syracuse, NY	Jenn Gilligan	W 2–0	10–10–3 (6–1–2)
January 16	Mercyhurst		Oncenter War Memorial Arena • Syracuse, NY	Jenn Gilligan	L 1–3	10–11–3 (6–2–2)
January 22	at RIT		Gene Polisseni Center • Rochester, NY	Jenn Gilligan	L 1–2 ^{OT}	10–12–3 (6–3–2)
January 23	RIT		Tennity Ice Skating Pavilion • Syracuse, NY	Jenn Gilligan	W 3–0	11–12–3 (7–3–2)
January 29	at Mercyhurst		Mercyhurst Ice Center • Erie, PA	Jenn Gilligan	L 1–4	11–13–3 (7–4–2)
January 30	at Mercyhurst		Mercyhurst Ice Center • Erie, PA	Jenn Gilligan	W 2–1 ^{OT}	12–13–3 (8–4–2)
February 5	at Penn State		Pegula Ice Arena • University Park, PA	Jenn Gilligan	W 3–2 ^{OT}	13–13–3 (9–4–2)
February 6	at Penn State		Pegula Ice Arena • University Park, PA	Jenn Gilligan	W 2–1	14–13–3 (10–4–2)
February 12	Robert Morris		Tennity Ice Skating Pavilion • Syracuse, NY	Jenn Gilligan	W 6–1	15–13–3 (11–4–2)
February 13	Robert Morris		Tennity Ice Skating Pavilion • Syracuse, NY	Jenn Gilligan	W 3–2	16–13–3 (12–4–2)
February 19	Lindenwood		Oncenter War Memorial Arena • Syracuse, NY	Abbey Miller	W 6–1	17–13–3 (13–4–2)
February 19	Lindenwood		Oncenter War Memorial Arena • Syracuse, NY	Maddi Welch	W 2–0	18–13–3 (14–4–2)
CHA Tournament
March 4	vs. Penn State*		HarborCenter • Buffalo, NY (Semifinal)	Jenn Gilligan	W 3–2 ^{3OT}	19–13–3
March 5	vs. Mercyhurst*		HarborCenter • Buffalo, NY (CHA Championship Game)	Jenn Gilligan	L 3–4 ^{OT}	19–14–3
*Non-conference game. ^{#}Rankings from USCHO.com Poll.

== Awards and honors ==
- Melissa Piacentini, CHA Player of the Year
- Nicole Renault, Defenseman of the Year
- Jessica Sibley, Stephanie Grossi (tie), CHA Scoring Trophy
- Jessica Sibley, CHA Best Defensive Forward
- Stephanie Grossi F, All-CHA First Team
- Nicole Renault D, All-CHA First Team
- Melissa Piacentini F, 2014-15 All-CHA Second Team
- Jessica Sibley F, 2014-15 All-CHA Second Team
- Megan Quinn D, 2014-15 All-CHA Second Team
