= 2015–16 RIT Tigers women's ice hockey season =

- Conference: #6 CHA
- Home ice: Gene Polisseni Center, Rochester, NY

Record
- Overall: 8–27–1
- Conference: 4–15–1
- Home: 4–14–1
- Road: 4–13–0

Coaches and captains
- Head coach: Scott McDonald (10th season)
- Assistant coaches: Matt Woodard
- Captain(s): Jess Paton; Taylor Thurston
- Alternate captain(s): Cassie Clayton; Carly Payerl

The RIT Tigers represented the Rochester Institute of Technology in College Hockey America during the 2015-16 NCAA Division I women's ice hockey season.

== Standings ==
2015–16 College Hockey America standings
	Conference							Overall					
	GP	W	L	T	PTS	GF	GA	GP	W	L	T	GF	GA
Mercyhurst†*	20	14	3	3	31	55	26	35	19	11	5	92	74
Syracuse	20	14	4	2	30	56	28	36	19	14	3	96	77
Penn State	20	6	8	6	18	33	35	37	12	19	6	65	76
Robert Morris	20	7	9	4	18	52	57	38	17	16	9	108	97
Lindenwood	20	5	11	4	14	31	46	37	9	24	4	64	102
RIT	20	4	15	1	9	25	60	36	8	27	1	51	108
Championship: Mercyhurst † indicates conference regular season champion * indicates conference tournament champion Current rankings: USCHO.com Division I women's poll

- Rankings based on number of wins in the conference

== Offseason ==
- June 26: 2015 graduate and team captain Celeste Brown signed with the New York Riveters of the NWHL to become the first RIT player to sign a professional contract with the league.

=== Recruiting ===
Player	Position	Nationality	Notes
Brooke Baker	Forward	United States	Member of the Niagara Jr. Purple Eagles
Kendall Cornine	Forward	United States	Played for the East Coast Wizards
Jenna de Jonge	Goaltender	Canada	Attended Pursuit of Excellence Academy
Brinna Dochniak	Defender	United States	Member of the Minnesota Blades
Kathryn Kennedy	Forward	Canada	High scoring forward with the Hamilton Hawks
Logan Land	Defender	Canada	Blueliner for the Burlington Jr. Barracudas
Mallory Rushton	Forward	Canada	Attended New Hampton Prep
Reagan Rust	Forward	United States	Played for Pittsburgh Penguins Elite
Kandice Sheriff	Forward	Canada	Power Forward for the Leaside Wildcats

== Roster ==
=== 2015–16 Tigers ===
No.	Nat.	Player	Class	Pos	Height	DoB	Hometown	Previous team
2		Taylor Thurston (C)	Junior	D	5' 6" (1.68 m)		Kanata, Ontario	Nepean Wildcats
4		Caitlin Wallace	Junior	F	5' 9" (1.75 m)		Brantford, Ontario	Stoney Creek Sabres
5		Haley Northcote	Senior	D	5' 7" (1.7 m)		Cumberland, Ontario	Minnesota State
7		Brooke Baker	Freshman	F	5' 8" (1.73 m)		Saline, Michigan	Niagara Jr. Purple Eagles
9		Lindsay Stenason	Junior	F/D	5' 6" (1.68 m)		Oakville, Ontario	Oakville Hornets
11		Christa Vuglar	Sophomore	D	5' 3" (1.6 m)		Crystal Lake, Illinois	Chicago Mission
13		Darcy Henderson	Sophomore	F	5' 7" (1.7 m)		Burlington, Ontario	Burlington Barracudas
14		Mackenzie Stone	Junior	F	5' 8" (1.73 m)		Kars, Ontario	Nepean Wildcats
15		Kandice Sheriff	Freshman	F	5' 9" (1.75 m)		Brampton, Ontario	Leaside Wildcats
16		Maddie Grisko	Sophomore	D	5' 6" (1.68 m)		Buffalo, New York	Buffalo Bisons
17		Carly Payerl (A)	Senior	F	5' 9" (1.75 m)		Kitchener, Ontario	Waterloo K-W Rangers
18		Reagan Rust	Freshman	F/D	5' 7" (1.7 m)		Southaven, Mississippi	Pittsburgh Penguins Elite
19		Lauren Carroll	Sophomore	D	5' 10" (1.78 m)		Carlisle, Ontario	Oakville Hornets
20		Mallory Rushton	Freshman	F	5' 2" (1.57 m)		Amherst, Nova Scotia	New Hampton Prep
21		Logan Land	Freshman	F/D	5' 8" (1.73 m)		Turkey Point, Ontario	Burlington Jr. Barracudas
22		Victoria Pitawanakwat	Sophomore	F	5' 9" (1.75 m)		Manitowaning, Ontario	Sudbury Wolves
23		Brinna Dochniak	Freshman	F	5' 5" (1.65 m)		Marine on St. Croix, Minnesota	Stillwater Ponies
24		Kathryn Kennedy	Freshman	F	5' 5" (1.65 m)		Hamilton, Ontario	Hamilton Hawks
25		Cassie Clayton (A)	Junior	F	5' 6" (1.68 m)		Pickering, Ontario	Mississauga Jr. Chiefs
27		Jess Paton (C)	Senior	F	5' 4" (1.63 m)		Woodstock, Ontario	Waterloo K-W Rangers
31		Jenna de Jonge	Freshman	G	5' 10" (1.78 m)		Abbotsford, British Columbia	Pursuit of Excellence
34		Brooke Stoddart	Junior	G	5' 6" (1.68 m)		Elmvale, Ontario	Brampton Thunder
35		Jetta Rackleff	Senior	G	5' 8" (1.73 m)		Bend, Oregon	Anaheim Lady Ducks

== Schedule ==
Date	Opponent^{#}	Rank^{#}	Site	Decision	Result	Record
Regular Season
October 2	Minnesota State*		Gene Polisseni Center • Rochester, NY	Brooke Stoddart	W 2–1	1–0–0
October 3	Minnesota State*		Gene Polisseni Center • Rochester, NY	Jenna de Jonge	L 2–4	1–1–0
October 9	Rensselaer*		Gene Polisseni Center • Rochester, NY	Brooke Stoddart	L 2–6	1–2–0
October 10	Rensselaer*		Gene Polisseni Center • Rochester, NY	Jetta Rackleff	L 1–3	1–3–0
October 21	at Syracuse		Tennity Ice Skating Pavilion • Syracuse, NY	Jenna de Jonge	L 1–7	1–4–0 (0–1–0)
October 23	at Union*		Achilles Center • Schenectady, NY	Jenna de Jonge	W 3–1	2–4–0
October 24	at Union*		Achilles Center • Schenectady, NY	Brooke Stoddart	W 2–1	3–4–0
October 30	at Mercyhurst		Mercyhurst Ice Center • Erie, PA	Brooke Stoddart	L 0–5	3–5–0 (0–2–0)
October 31	at Mercyhurst		Mercyhurst Ice Center • Erie, PA	Jenna de Jonge	L 3–4 ^{OT}	3–6–0 (0–3–0)
November 6	Robert Morris		Gene Polisseni Center • Rochester, NY	Brooke Stoddart	L 0–4	3–7–0 (0–4–0)
November 7	Robert Morris		Gene Polisseni Center • Rochester, NY	Jenna de Jonge	L 3–6	3–8–0 (0–5–0)
November 13	Colgate*		Gene Polisseni Center • Rochester, NY	Brooke Stoddart	L 2–3	3–9–0
November 14	at Colgate*		Starr Rink • Hamilton, NY	Brooke Stoddart	L 1–3	3–10–0
November 18	Syracuse		Gene Polisseni Center • Rochester, NY	Jenna de Jonge	L 1–5	3–11–0 (0–6–0)
November 20	Brown*		Gene Polisseni Center • Rochester, NY	Brooke Stoddart	W 5–1	4–11–0
November 21	Brown*		Gene Polisseni Center • Rochester, NY	Brooke Stoddart	L 1–2	4–12–0
November 27	Princeton*		Gene Polisseni Center • Rochester, NY	Brooke Stoddart	L 0–4	4–13–0
November 28	Princeton*		Gene Polisseni Center • Rochester, NY	Jenna de Jonge	L 1–6	4–14–0
December 4	Lindenwood		Gene Polisseni Center • Rochester, NY	Jetta Rackleff	L 1–4	4–15–0 (0–7–0)
December 5	Lindenwood		Gene Polisseni Center • Rochester, NY	Jetta Rackleff	T 1–1 ^{OT}	4–15–1 (0–7–1)
January 8, 2016	at Providence*		Schneider Arena • Providence, RI	Jetta Rackleff	L 1–5	4–16–1
January 9	at Providence*		Schneider Arena • Providence, RI	Jetta Rackleff	L 1–3	4–17–1
January 15	Penn State		Gene Polisseni Center • Rochester, NY	Jetta Rackleff	W 3–0	5–17–1 (1–7–1)
January 16	Penn State		Gene Polisseni Center • Rochester, NY	Jetta Rackleff	L 2–3 ^{OT}	5–18–1 (1–8–1)
January 22	Syracuse		Gene Polisseni Center • Rochester, NY	Jetta Rackleff	W 2–1 ^{OT}	6–18–1 (2–8–1)
January 23	at Syracuse		Tennity Ice Skating Pavilion • Syracuse, NY	Jetta Rackleff	L 0–3	6–19–1 (2–9–1)
January 29	at Penn State		Pegula Ice Arena • University Park, PA	Jetta Rackleff	L 0–1	6–20–1 (2–10–1)
January 30	at Penn State		Pegula Ice Arena • University Park, PA	Jenna de Jonge	L 0–2	6–21–1 (2–11–1)
February 5	at Lindenwood		Lindenwood Ice Arena • Wentzville, MO	Jenna de Jonge	W 3–2	7–21–1 (3–11–1)
February 6	at Lindenwood		Lindenwood Ice Arena • Wentzville, MO	Jetta Rackleff	L 1–2	7–22–1 (3–12–1)
February 12	Mercyhurst		Gene Polisseni Center • Rochester, NY	Jetta Rackleff	L 1–4	7–23–1 (3–13–1)
February 13	Mercyhurst		Gene Polisseni Center • Rochester, NY	Jetta Rackleff	L 0–2	7–24–1 (3–14–1)
February 19	at Robert Morris		RMU Island Sports Center • Neville Township, PA	Jetta Rackleff	L 0–2	7–25–1 (3–15–1)
February 20	at Robert Morris		RMU Island Sports Center • Neville Township, PA	Jenna de Jonge	W 3–2 ^{OT}	8–25–1 (4–15–1)
CHA Tournament
February 26	at Penn State*		Pegula Ice Arena • University Park, PA (Quarterfinal, Game 1)	Jenna de Jonge	L 0–2	8–26–1
February 27	at Penn State*		Pegula Ice Arena • University Park, PA (Quarterfinal, Game 2)	Jetta Rackleff	L 2–3	8–27–1
*Non-conference game. ^{#}Rankings from USCHO.com Poll.

== Awards and honors ==
- Reagan Rust
  CHA Rookie of the Month, November, 2015
- Jetta Rackleff
  CHA Goaltender of the Month, December, 2015
- Jenna de Jonge
  CHA Rookie of the Month, February, 2016
- Reagan Rust, Defender
  CHA All-Rookie Team,
