= 2015–16 Penn State Nittany Lions women's ice hockey season =

- Conference: 3rd College Hockey America
- Home ice: Pegula Ice Arena

Record
- Overall: 12-19-6
- Conference: 6-8-6
- Home: 8-8-2
- Road: 4-10-4
- Neutral: 0-1-0

Coaches and captains
- Head coach: Josh Brandwene (4th season)
- Assistant coaches: Courtney Drennan; Alex Dawes
- Captain(s): Jordin Pardoski; Shannon Yoxheimer
- Alternate captain(s): Sarah Wilkie; Laura Bowman

The Penn State Nittany Lions women represented Penn State University in CHA women's ice hockey during the 2015-16 NCAA Division I women's ice hockey season. For the second consecutive year, the Nittany Lions finished conference play in third place, and advanced to the CHA Tournament Semi-Final, before losing to Syracuse. Penn State took that game into triple overtime, before falling 3-2.

== Standings ==
2015–16 College Hockey America standings
	Conference							Overall					
	GP	W	L	T	PTS	GF	GA	GP	W	L	T	GF	GA
Mercyhurst†*	20	14	3	3	31	55	26	35	19	11	5	92	74
Syracuse	20	14	4	2	30	56	28	36	19	14	3	96	77
Penn State	20	6	8	6	18	33	35	37	12	19	6	65	76
Robert Morris	20	7	9	4	18	52	57	38	17	16	9	108	97
Lindenwood	20	5	11	4	14	31	46	37	9	24	4	64	102
RIT	20	4	15	1	9	25	60	36	8	27	1	51	108
Championship: Mercyhurst † indicates conference regular season champion * indicates conference tournament champion Current rankings: USCHO.com Division I women's poll

- Rankings based on number of wins in the conference

== Offseason ==
- August 3: Goaltender Celine Whitlinger was selected to attend the 2015 USA Hockey Women’s National Festival.

=== Recruiting ===
Player	Position	Nationality	Notes
Kelsey Crow	Defender	United States	Attended Minnetonka (MN) High School
Hannah England	Forward	United States	Played for Shattuck-St. Mary's
Meike Meilleur	Forward	Canada	Attended St. Mary's Academy
Victoria Samuelsson	Forward	Sweden	Assistant Captain of the Swedish U-18 National Team

== Roster ==
=== 2015–16 Nittany Lions ===
No.	Nat.	Player	Class	Pos	Height	DoB	Hometown	Previous team
1		Hannah Ehresmann	Sophomore	G	5' 8" (1.73 m)		Minnetonka, Minnesota	Minnetonka HS
2		Jeanette Bateman	Senior	D	5' 6" (1.68 m)		Greeley, Colorado	Colorado Select
3		Irene Kiroplis	Sophomore	F/D	5' 8" (1.73 m)		Georgetown, Ontario	Brampton Canadettes
4		Jordin Pardoski (C)	Senior	D	5' 5" (1.65 m)		Rochester Hills, Michigan	Detroit Honeybaked
5		Stephanie Walkom	Senior	D	5' 7" (1.7 m)		Moon Township, Pennsylvania	Pittsburgh Penguins Elite
7		Kelsey Crow	Freshman	D	5' 5" (1.65 m)		Minnetonka, Minnesota	Minnetonka HS
8		Christi Vetter	Sophomore	F	5' 11" (1.8 m)		Lakeville, Minnesota	Lakeville North HS
9		Amy Petersen	Junior	F	5' 4" (1.63 m)		Minnetonka, Minnesota	Minnetonka HS
10		Micayla Catanzariti	Senior	F	5' 4" (1.63 m)		Rancho Santa Margarita, California	Gilmour Academy
11		Bella Sutton	Sophomore	D	5' 6" (1.68 m)		Shoreview, Minnesota	Mounds View HS
12		Sarah Nielsen	Junior	F	5' 6" (1.68 m)		Edina, Minnesota	Edina HS
13		Hannah England	Freshman	F	5' 6" (1.68 m)		Simi Valley, California	Shattuck-St. Mary's
15		Aly Hardy	Sophomore	F	5' 7" (1.7 m)		St. Albans, Vermont	Boston Shamrocks
16		Hannah Hoenshell	Senior	F	5' 3" (1.6 m)		Plano, Texas	Alliance Bulldogs
17		Paige Jahnke	Senior	D	5' 6" (1.68 m)		Oakdale, Minnesota	Roseville HS
18		Laura Bowman (A)	Junior	F	5' 7" (1.7 m)		Minnetonka, Minnesota	Minnetonka HS
19		Jill Holdcroft	Senior	F	5' 1" (1.55 m)		Pennsylvania Furnace, Pennsylvania	Pittsburgh Penguins Elite
20		Emily Laurenzi	Senior	F	5' 2" (1.57 m)		Townsend, Delaware	National Sports Academy
21		Sarah Wilkie (A)	Senior	D	5' 6" (1.68 m)		Ashby, Massachusetts	Williston Northampton School
22		Remi Martin	Sophomore	D	5' 6" (1.68 m)		Littleton, Colorado	Team Pittsburgh
24		Victoria Samuelsson	Freshman	F	5' 7" (1.7 m)		Leksand, Sweden	Bay State Breakers
26		Meike Meilleur	Freshman	F	5' 10" (1.78 m)		Marquette, Manitoba	Team Manitoba
27		Kelly Seward	Junior	D	5' 9" (1.75 m)		Williamsville, New York	Nichols School
28		Hannah Bramm	Senior	F	5' 7" (1.7 m)		Tampa, Florida	Minnesota Duluth (WCHA)
30		Celine Whitlinger	Senior	G	5' 8" (1.73 m)		Garden Grove, California	Gilmour Academy
31		Amber Greene	Sophomore	G	5' 3" (1.6 m)		Feeding Hills, Massachusetts	Kingswood-Oxford School
40		Shannon Yoxheimer (C)	Senior	F	5' 7" (1.7 m)		Jackson, Michigan	North American Hockey Academy

== Schedule ==
Date	Opponent^{#}	Rank^{#}	Site	Decision	Result	Record
Regular Season
October 1	#1 Minnesota*		Pegula Ice Arena • University Park, PA	Celine Whitlinger	L 0–2	0–1–0
October 2	#1 Minnesota*		Pegula Ice Arena • University Park, PA	Hannah Ehresmann	L 0–5	0–2–0
October 9	at #7 Boston University*		Walter Brown Arena • Boston, MA	Celine Whitlinger	W 5–3	1–2–0
October 10	at #7 Boston University*		Walter Brown Arena • Boston, MA	Hannah Ehresmann	L 1–3	1–3–0
October 17	Union*		Pegula Ice Arena • University Park, PA	Celine Whitlinger	W 3–0	2–3–0
October 18	Union*		Pegula Ice Arena • University Park, PA	Hannah Ehresmann	W 3–0	3–3–0
October 24	Connecticut*		Pegula Ice Arena • University Park, PA	Celine Whitlinger	L 0–1	3–4–0
October 25	Connecticut*		Pegula Ice Arena • University Park, PA	Hannah Ehresmann	L 3–4	3–5–0
October 30	at Lindenwood		Lindenwood Ice Arena • Wentzville, MO	Celine Whitlinger	L 2–5	3–6–0 (0–1–0)
October 31	at Lindenwood		Lindenwood Ice Arena • Wentzville, MO	Celine Whitlinger	T 1–1 ^{OT}	3–6–1 (0–1–1)
November 6	Mercyhurst		Pegula Ice Arena • University Park, PA	Celine Whitlinger	L 0–1	3–7–1 (0–2–1)
November 7	Mercyhurst		Pegula Ice Arena • University Park, PA	Celine Whitlinger	T 1–1 ^{OT}	3–7–2 (0–2–2)
November 13	at Robert Morris		RMU Island Sports Center • Neville Township, PA	Celine Whitlinger	T 2–2 ^{OT}	3–7–3 (0–2–3)
November 14	at Robert Morris		RMU Island Sports Center • Neville Township, PA	Celine Whitlinger	W 5–1	4–7–3 (1–2–3)
November 23	at St. Lawrence*		Appleton Arena • Canton, NY	Hannah Ehresmann	L 2–3	4–8–3
November 24	at St. Lawrence*		Appleton Arena • Canton, NY	Celine Whitlinger	L 2–4	4–9–3
December 4	at Syracuse		Tennity Ice Skating Pavilion • Syracuse, NY	Celine Whitlinger	L 1–3	4–10–3 (1–3–3)
December 5	at Syracuse		Tennity Ice Skating Pavilion • Syracuse, NY	Celine Whitlinger	T 1–1 ^{OT}	4–10–4 (1–3–4)
December 11	at Princeton*		Hobey Baker Memorial Rink • Princeton, NJ	Hannah Ehresmann	L 0–4	4–11–4
December 12	at Princeton*		Hobey Baker Memorial Rink • Princeton, NJ	Hannah Ehresmann	L 2–3	4–12–4
January 2, 2016	at Ohio State*		OSU Ice Rink • Columbus, OH	Celine Whitlinger	L 1–2	4–13–4
January 3	at Ohio State*		OSU Ice Rink • Columbus, OH	Hannah Ehresmann	W 3–2	5–13–4
January 15	at RIT		Gene Polisseni Center • Rochester, NY	Celine Whitlinger	L 0–3	5–14–4 (1–4–4)
January 16	at RIT		Gene Polisseni Center • Rochester, NY	Hannah Ehresmann	W 3–2 ^{OT}	6–14–4 (2–4–4)
January 22	Robert Morris		Pegula Ice Arena • University Park, PA	Celine Whitlinger	W 3–2 ^{OT}	7–14–4 (3–4–4)
January 23	Robert Morris		Pegula Ice Arena • University Park, PA	Hannah Ehresmann	T 2–2 ^{OT}	7–14–5 (3–4–5)
January 29	RIT		Pegula Ice Arena • University Park, PA	Celine Whitlinger	W 1–0	8–14–5 (4–4–5)
January 30	RIT		Pegula Ice Arena • University Park, PA	Hannah Ehresmann	W 2–0	9–14–5 (5–4–5)
February 5	Syracuse		Pegula Ice Arena • University Park, PA	Celine Whitlinger	L 2–3 ^{OT}	9–15–5 (5–5–5)
February 6	Syracuse		Pegula Ice Arena • University Park, PA	Hannah Ehresmann	L 1–2	9–16–5 (5–6–5)
February 12	Lindenwood		Pegula Ice Arena • University Park, PA	Celine Whitlinger	W 3–0	10–16–5 (6–6–5)
February 13	Lindenwood		Pegula Ice Arena • University Park, PA	Hannah Ehresmann	L 0–1	10–17–5 (6–7–5)
February 19	at Mercyhurst		Mercyhurst Ice Center • Erie, PA	Celine Whitlinger	L 1–3	10–18–5 (6–8–5)
February 20	at Mercyhurst		Mercyhurst Ice Center • Erie, PA	Hannah Ehresmann	T 2–2 ^{OT}	10–18–6 (6–8–6)
CHA Tournament
February 26	RIT*		Pegula Ice Arena • University Park, PA (Quarterfinals, Game 1)	Celine Whitlinger	W 2–0	11–18–6
February 27	RIT*		Pegula Ice Arena • University Park, PA (Quarterfinals, Game 2)	Hannah Ehresmann	W 3–2	12–18–6
March 4	vs. Syracuse*		HarborCenter • Buffalo, NY (Semifinal Game)	Celine Whitlinger	L 2–3 ^{3OT}	12–19–6
*Non-conference game. ^{#}Rankings from USCHO.com Poll.

== Awards and honors ==
- Micayla Catanzariti, CHA Defensive Forward of the Year
- Jill Holdcroft, CHA Sportsmanship Award
- Celine Whitlinger G, All-CHA Second Team
- Amy Peterson F, All-CHA Second Team
