= Achilles Rink =

Ice Hockey rink in New York state

Brooks Field at Achilles Center
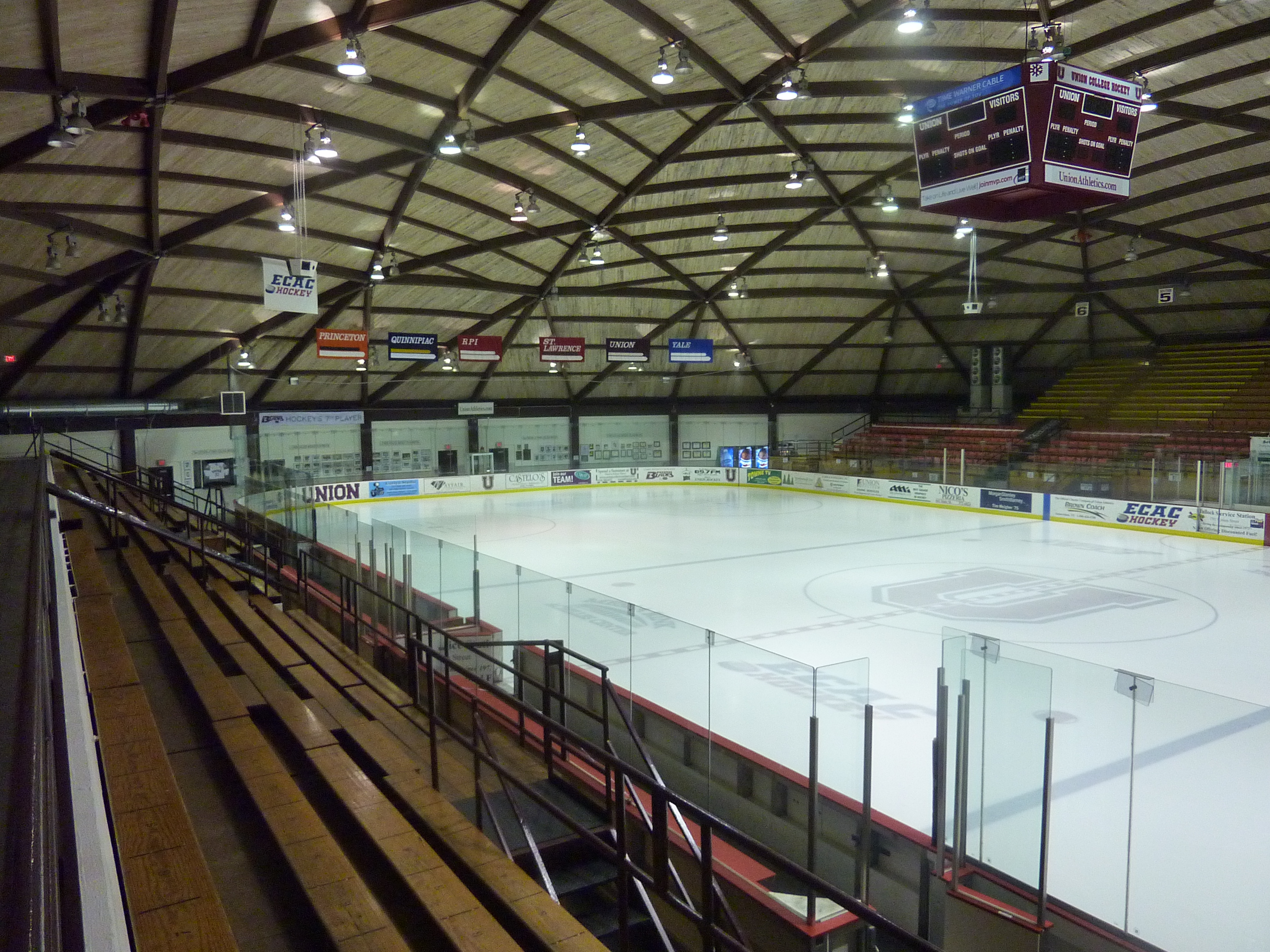
- Interactive map of Brooks Field at Achilles Center
- Former names: Achilles Rink (1975-2003)
- Location: 807 Union Street; Schenectady, New York
- Coordinates: 42.817991°N 73.924813°W
- Owner: Union College
- Operator: Union College
- Capacity: 2,225 (hockey)
- Surface: 201x86 ft (hockey)

Construction
- Groundbreaking: November 2, 1974
- Opened: November 15, 1975
- Renovated: 2003
- Cost: $1.5 million
- Architects: Link and Cullen Architects (Schenectady, NY)
- General contractor: Hanson Construction Co.

Tenants
- Union College Garnet Chargers (men's and women's hockey)

The Brooks Field at Achilles Center is a 2,225-seat multi-purpose arena in Schenectady, New York. It was home to the Union College men's ice hockey and women's ice hockey teams, members of the ECAC Hockey League. The facility opened in 1975 as Achilles Rink and was named in honor of its original benefactor, the Rev. H. Laurence Achilles, Sr. In 2003, it was renovated and renamed Frank L. Messa Rink at Achilles Center in honor of Frank L. Messa, class of 1973, whose made the renovation possible. One of the unique and distinguishing features of the building is its light colored wooden dome roof which is supported by a complex geometric pattern of dark colored wooden beams. The arena also houses the Travis J. Clark '00 Strength Training Facility.

== Renovations ==
During the summer of 2003, the rink underwent phase 1 of a $1.5 million renovation after a gift from alumnus Frank L. Messa '73. Renamed Frank L. Messa Rink at Achilles Center, the renovated facility was officially unveiled for competition on October 18, 2003. Improvements included a new ice sheet with state of the art chilling system, improved climate control, spring loaded boards, seamless glass, new overhead center scoreboard, reconfigured penalty boxes, more spacious aisles, and seating with improved sight lines. Seating capacity was reduced from 2,504 to 2,225 to accommodate the changes. Phase 2 of the project was completed during the 2003–2004 academic year and included construction of new locker rooms, a reconfigured lobby, a sports medicine area, and training facility.

In January 2016, a $10 million renovation plan for Achilles Center was announced by Union College Athletic Director Jim McLaughlin. The list of improvements for the project includes: New ice sheet floor, sideboards & glass, new main entrance at south side of rink, new video scoreboard, new seating, new concession stands, new restroom facilities, new coaches offices and new hospitality room with views of the rink and football field. Fundraising for the project had been approved but a time line for start of construction was not announced.

In February 2024 it was announced that both the Men's and Women's ice hockey programs teams would move off-campus to the M&T Bank Center starting in the fall of 2025. Moving the hockey programs will free up space in the Achilles Center for other athletic uses. The final hockey game was played at the arena on March 15th, 2025, a 2-7 ECAC quarterfinals loss to Dartmouth Big Green men's ice hockey.

In 2025 Union College received a $1 million gift from Andy and Sana Brooks to support the reconfiguration of Messa Rink into a new 27,000-square-foot (2,500 m^{2}) indoor turf facility. With this announcement the facility was renamed the Brooks Field at Achilles Center.

Sporting positions
Preceded by Frank Ritter Memorial Ice Arena	Host of the Division III men's Frozen Four; 1985	Succeeded by John S. Glas Field House
