= Starr Rink =

Arena in Hamilton, New York

- Interactive map of Starr Rink
- Full name: J. Howard Starr Rink
- Address: Hamilton, NY; U.S.
- Coordinates: 42°48′55″N 75°32′33″W
- Owner: Colgate University
- Operator: Colgate University Athletics
- Capacity: 2,000 (hockey)
- Type: Arena
- Surface: 200x85 ft (hockey)
- Current use: Basketball

Construction
- Opened: 1959; 67 years ago

Tenants
- Colgate Raiders men's (1959–2016) and women's (1997-2016) ice hockey

J. Howard Starr Rink is a 2,000-seat arena in Hamilton, New York. It opened in 1959 and was the home of the Colgate Raiders men's and women's ice hockey teams until 2016. The arena was dedicated in honor of former head coach John Howard Starr on December 11, 1959. The hockey arena was built as the southern half of the William A. Reid Athletic Center, a twin barrel-vaulted complex which also houses Cotterell Court. The complex is located on the western side of campus next to Andy Kerr Stadium and across Broad Street from Huntington Gymnasium, the school's former athletics facility.

Prior to its completion, all Colgate home games were played on open-air surfaces and the lack of available ice caused the men's program to be shuttered from 1951 through 1957. The Rink served as the home of the women's program from their move to varsity status in 1997 until the Class of 1965 Arena was completed, upon which both programs migrated to the new facility.

Currently, the building is being used as a basketball practice facility.
