= Reginald Heber Howe, Jr. =

American naturalist and school teacher (1875–1932)

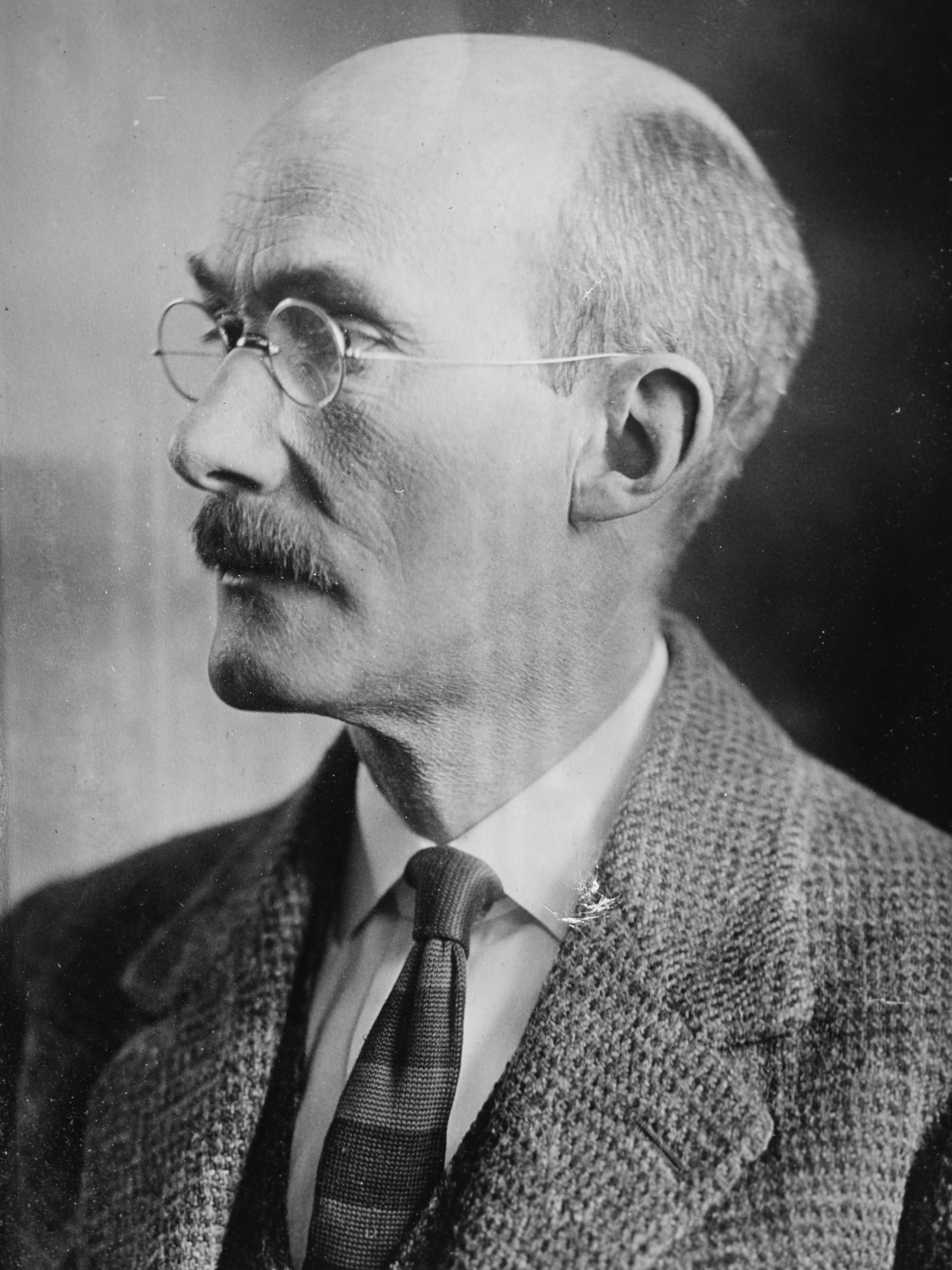
- Born: 10 April 1875; Quincy, Massachusetts
- Died: 28 January 1932 (aged 56)
- Education: Harvard University
- Scientific career
- Workplaces: Middlesex School; Belmont Hill School
- Author abbrev. (botany): R.Howe

Reginald Heber Howe, Jr. (April 10, 1875 – 28 January 1932) was an American naturalist and preparatory school science teacher. His research specialized in the lichens, birds, and dragonflies. He founded the Belmont Hill School and served as its first headmaster.

== Life and career ==
Reginald Heber Howe, Jr., born on April 10, 1875, in Quincy, Massachusetts, was the second child of a prominent Episcopalian minister of the same name. Reginald Heber Howe senior (1846–1924) became the rector of the Church of Our Saviour in Brookline in 1877. The early life of Reginald Heber Howe, Jr., was predominantly spent in the Longwood area of Brookline, known for its grand mansions. Howe completed his education at the Noble and Greenough Preparatory School in Boston and later worked for three years at the Plymouth Cordage Company to fund his college education. He enrolled at Harvard University in 1897, graduating from the Lawrence Scientific School in 1901.

During his academic years, Howe demonstrated a prolific interest in the natural sciences, publishing several articles. His early works included studies on North American wood frogs, subspecies of birds, a mammal species, and the breeding behavior of the American robin in eastern Massachusetts. Additionally, Howe authored or co-authored four books on ornithology, and had a deep interest in biogeography.

Following his graduation in 1901, Howe began a teaching career at Middlesex School in Concord, Massachusetts, a newly established preparatory school for boys. Over the next two decades, he contributed significantly to the school, teaching science, and coaching crew. In 1921, he coached the freshman rowing team; this went so well that he was asked to coach both the freshman and varsity crews the following year. He founded the Thoreau Museum of Natural History. During this period, Howe also became an authority on North American lichens, co-authoring a field guide with his wife.

Howe's academic pursuits led him to the Sorbonne (a name commonly used to refer to the historic University of Paris in Paris), where he obtained a Docteur de l'Université degree in natural science. This achievement was based on his extensive work on lichens, completed during a sabbatical from July 1911 to September 1912. In this excursion, Howe and his wide took a boat to Newfoundland and collected lichens there for month, before sailing for England. Between 1911 and 1916 he edited the exsiccata series Lichenes Novae Angliae. Howe's interest in entomology, particularly dragonflies, was sparked around 1913, following a discovery on the Middlesex School grounds. His entomological research continued during a second sabbatical at Harvard University's Entomological Laboratory from 1921 to 1923. By 1926 he had published more than 300 pages of research in scientific journals, with a particular emphasis on lichens and dragonflies.

A dispute over naming an undescribed dragonfly species between Howe and Edward Bruce Williamson, a dragonfly authority, highlights the complexities and tensions within the scientific community regarding naming rights and historical correctness. Despite Howe's assertion that the new species had already been named in the literature, albeit not formally described, Williamson proceeded to describe and name the species as Williamsonia fletcheri (the ebony boghaunter). The saga, revealed through archived correspondence, involved other prominent odonatologists and exposed the personality clashes and competing interests among specialists in the field. Williamson eventually prevailed, so now the species has the name he proposed, and the author citation "Williamson".

In his later years, Howe founded the Belmont Hill School and served as its first headmaster. He emphasized the importance of athletics in education and had scholarly publications to that effect. In the "Story of Belmont Hill", he is described as "a man of broad experience, unbounded energy, vigorous imagination, sound judgement, and a man who genuinely liked people—boys, teachers, parents and anyone who had anything to do with the school". In this book, a colleague answers the question: "What was Dr. Howe like?"

He was not very tall, about five feet eight, broad-shouldered, and well coordinated – a good athletic type for his size and weight. He had been quite bald since his college years, so that you noticed his ears. What really drew your attention, however, were his eyes as he looked at you through his gold-rimmed glasses – a glance that was at once keen but friendly. As he sat at his desk, clad in his sportscoat, knickerbockers and golf stockings of the period, he would rub his mustache as he listened patiently or spoke – always in moderate tones – with boy or master.

Howe's life came to an abrupt end due to a heart attack on January 28, 1932, at the age of 56. In his obituary, the Boston Society of Natural History lauded him as a respected teacher and naturalist.

The lichen Vermilacinia howei was named in his honor in 1996, for his contributions to lichenology and to acknowledge his efforts in providing images of the type specimens in his revision of the genus Ramalina.

== Selected publications ==
- Howe, R. H. Jr. (1896). Every Bird: A Guide to the Identification of the Birds of Woodland, Beach and Ocean. Boston, MA: Bradlee Whidden.
- ——————— (1906). "Lichens of Mount Monadnock, New Hampshire". The American Naturalist. 40 (477): 661–665. doi:10.1086/278666. JSTOR 2454851.
- ——————— (1912). "A Monograph of the North American Usneaceae". Missouri Botanical Garden Annual Report. 1912: 133–146. doi:10.2307/2400036. JSTOR 2400036.
- ——————— (1914). A Monograph of the Usneaceae of the United States and Canada. 2 parts. Memoirs of the Thoreau Museum of Natural History. Vol. 25. Concord, MA: Thoreau Museum of Natural History.
- ——————— (1921). "The distribution of New England Odonata". Proceedings of the Boston Society of Natural History. 36 (2): 105–133.
- ——————— (1925). "Athletic influence". In The Education of the Modern Boy. Boston, MA: Houghton Mifflin Co. pp. 139–196.
