= 2025–26 Boston College Eagles women's ice hockey season =

NCAA Division I women's hockey season

- Conference: WHEA
- Home ice: Conte Forum

Record
- Overall: 4–5–1
- Conference: 3–1–1
- Home: 1–0–0
- Road: 3–5–1

Coaches and captains
- Head coach: Katie King-Crowley
- Assistant coaches: Kate Leary; Max Gavin; Ian Milosz
- Captain(s): Jade Arnone; Grace Campbell

The 2025–26 Boston College Eagles women's ice hockey season represents Boston College during the 2025–26 NCAA Division I women's ice hockey season. The team is coached by Katie King-Crowley in her 18th season.

== Offseason ==
=== Recruiting ===
Player	Position	Class	Previous school
Sage Babey	Forward	Sophomore	Merrimack
Emma Conner	Forward	Senior	Minnesota
Alaina Dunn	Defense	Incoming freshman	
Emily Mara	Forward	Incoming freshman	
Madelyn Murphy	Defense	Incoming freshman	
Maude Niemann	Forward	Incoming freshman	
Ava Thomas	Forward	Incoming freshman	
Maxim Tremblay	Forward	Incoming freshman	

=== Departures ===
Player	Position	Class	Previous school
Jenna Carpenter	Forward	Graduated	
Keri Clougherty	Defense	Graduated	
Kiley Erickson	Defense	Graduated	
Molly Jordan	Defense	Junior	Minnesota
Abby Newhook	Forward	Boston Fleet	
Olivia O'Brien	Forward	Graduated	
Julia Pellerin	Forward	Junior	Connecticut
Katie Pyne	Forward	Graduated	
Gaby Roy	Defense	Graduated	
Skyler Sharfman	Defense	Sophomore	Holy Cross
Carson Zanella	Forward	Graduated	

=== PWHL Draft ===
Round	Player	Position	Team
5	Abby Newhook	Forward	Boston Fleet

== Standings ==
2025–26 Hockey East standings
	Conference							Overall					
	GP	W	L	T	PTS	GF	GA	GP	W	L	T	GF	GA
#5 Northeastern	24	21	2	1	65	80	34	34	26	7	1	105	60
#6 UConn	24	17	6	1	54	76	40	34	24	8	2	99	57
Boston College	24	14	9	1	42	72	56	34	16	17	1	87	96
Holy Cross	24	10	11	3	37	49	46	33	18	12	3	77	55
New Hampshire	24	10	12	2	33	66	68	34	16	15	3	95	82
Vermont	24	9	11	4	32	55	58	36	15	16	5	78	89
Maine	24	8	12	4	30	46	54	34	12	18	4	66	87
Boston University	24	8	14	2	28	45	61	33	10	20	3	60	87
Providence	24	8	14	2	25	45	72	34	11	21	2	63	109
Merrimack	24	4	18	2	15	36	80	34	7	23	4	61	109
Championship: March 7, 2026 † indicates conference regular season champion; * indicates conference tournament champion Rankings: USCHO.com; updated February 21, 2026; Source: Hockey East

== Schedule ==
As of December 9, 2025.

Date	Time	Opponent^{#}	Rank^{#}	Site	Decision	Result	Attendance	Record	Ref
Regular Season
September 25	7:00	at #3 Minnesota*		Ridder Arena • Minneapolis, MN	Campbell	L 1–7	1,133	0–1–0	
September 26	7:00	at #3 Minnesota*		Ridder Arena • Minneapolis, MN	Campbell	L 0–11	1,721	0–2–0	
October 4	3:00	at St. Anselm*		Sullivan Arena • Manchester, NH	Campbell	W 4–1	234	1–2–0	
October 10	6:00	Holy Cross		Conte Forum • Chestnut Hill, MA	Campbell	W 4–2	345	2–2–0 (1–0–0)	
October 11	2:00	at Providence		Schneider Arena • Providence, RI	Campbell	W 5–1	416	3–2–0 (2–0–0)	
October 17	4:00	at #5 Cornell*		Lynah Rink • Ithaca, NY	Campbell	L 0–3	725	3–3–0	
October 18	3:00	at #5 Cornell*		Lynah Rink • Ithaca, NY	Campbell	L 2–4	950	3–4–0	
October 25	1:00	at Merrimack		Lawler Rink • North Andover, MA	Campbell	W 2–1	344	4–4–0 (3–0–0)	
October 31	11:00	at Vermont		Gutterson Fieldhouse • Burlington, VT	Campbell	L 3–4	1,698	4–5–0 (3–1–0)	
November 1	2:00	at Vermont		Gutterson Fieldhouse • Burlington, VT	Campbell	T 0–0 ^{SOW}	473	4–5–1 (3–1–1)	
November 7	6:00	#8 Connecticut		Conte Forum • Chestnut Hill, MA	Campbell	L 1–3	326	4–6–1 (3–2–1)	
November 8	3:00	at #8 Connecticut		Toscano Family Ice Forum • Storrs, CT	Campbell	W 2–1	778	5–6–1 (4–2–1)	
November 13	6:00	Boston University		Conte Forum • Chestnut Hill, MA	Campbell	W 5–2	482	6–6–1 (5–2–1)	
November 14	7:00	at Boston University		Walter Brown Arena • Boston, MA	Campbell	W 3–2	3,965	7–6–1 (6–2–1)	
November 22	2:00	at Merrimack		Conte Forum • Chestnut Hill, MA	Campbell	W 4–0	324	8–6–1 (7–2–1)	
November 28	5:00	St. Lawrence*		Conte Forum • Chestnut Hill, MA	Campbell	W 3–2 ^{OT}	295	9–6–1	
November 29	2:00	St. Lawrence*		Conte Forum • Chestnut Hill, MA	Campbell	L 2–4	220	9–7–1	
December 5	6:00	#6 Northeastern		Conte Forum • Chestnut Hill, MA	Campbell	L 1–3	251	9–8–1 (7–3–1)	
December 6	1:30	at #6 Northeastern		Matthews Arena • Boston, MA	Campbell	L 2–4	3,101	9–9–1 (7–4–1)	
January 3	2:00	Colgate*		Conte Forum • Chestnut Hill, MA					
January 9	6:00	at Holy Cross		Hart Center • Worcester, MA					
January 13	4:00	vs. Harvard*		TBD • TBD (The Beanpot)					
January 16	2:00	Providence		Conte Forum • Chestnut Hill, MA					
January 20	TBA	vs. TBD*		TD Garden • Boston, MA (The Beanpot)					
January 23	6:00	at New Hampshire		Whittemore Center • Durham, NH					
January 24	2:00	New Hampshire		Conte Forum • Chestnut Hill, MA					
January 30	6:00	Maine		Conte Forum • Chestnut Hill, MA					
February 1	2:00	Maine		Conte Forum • Chestnut Hill, MA					
February 6	2:00	at Holy Cross		Hart Center • Worcester, MA					
February 7	3:00	at Connecticut		Toscano Family Ice Forum • Storrs, CT					
February 13	2:00	Providence		Conte Forum • Chestnut Hill, MA					
February 15	TBA	at Northeastern		TBD • Boston, MA					
February 20	TBD	New Hampshire		Conte Forum • Chestnut Hill, MA					
February 21	2:00	Boston University		Conte Forum • Chestnut Hill, MA					
*Non-conference game. ^{#}Rankings from USCHO.com Poll.

== Roster ==
As of September 26, 2025.

No.	Nat.	Player	Class	Pos	Height	DoB	Hometown	Previous team
2	(United States)	Madelyn Murphy	Freshman	D	5' 8" (1.73 m)	2007-04-24	Dorchester, Massachusetts	Dexter Southfield School
3	(United States)	Alanna Devlin	Sophomore	F	5' 5" (1.65 m)	2006-07-31	Marshfield, Massachusetts	North American Hockey Academy
4	(United States)	Alaina Dunn	Freshman	D	5' 7" (1.7 m)	2007-04-20	Walpole, Massachusetts	Dexter Southfield School
6	(United States)	Emily Mara	Freshman	F	5' 6" (1.68 m)	2007-02-27	Winchester, Massachusetts	Phillips Academy
7	(United States)	Kate Ham	Freshman	F	5' 8" (1.73 m)	2003-06-29	Hingham, Massachusetts	Noble and Greenough School
8	(United States)	Kara Goulding	Freshman	F	5' 8" (1.73 m)	2003-11-06	Belmont, Massachusetts	Dexter Southfield School
9	(United States)	Maude Niemann	Freshman	F	5' 8" (1.73 m)	2006-12-14	Weston, Connecticut	St. Paul's School
10	(United States)	Jansen Lucas	Junior	F	5' 6" (1.68 m)	2005-00-00	Gunnison, Colorado	New Hampton School
11	(United States)	Ava Thomas	Freshman	F	5' 7" (1.7 m)	2006-09-27	Downingtown, Pennsylvania	Philadelphia Jr. Flyers
12	(United States)	Cailin Flynn	Freshman	D	5' 9" (1.75 m)	2003-03-31	Woburn, Massachusetts	Dexter Southfield School
13	(United States)	Jamie Griswold	Sophomore	D	5' 11" (1.8 m)	2006-05-03	Concord, Massachusetts	Noble and Greenough School
14	(United States)	Sammy Taber	Junior	F	5' 5" (1.65 m)	2005-06-13	Tewksbury, Massachusetts	Cushing Academy
16	(United States)	Tricia Piku	Sophomore	F	5' 7" (1.7 m)	2005-02-00	Harrison Township, Michigan	Lakeview High School
17	(United States)	Olivia Maffeo	Sophomore	D	5' 4" (1.63 m)	2005-03-28	Canton, Massachusetts	Noble and Greenough School
18	(Canada)	Sage Babey	Sophomore	F	5' 8" (1.73 m)	2006-08-08	Saskatoon, Saskatchewan	Merrimack
19	(United States)	Jade Arnone (C)	Senior	D	5' 11" (1.8 m)	2004-05-04	Sherborn, Massachusetts	St. Paul's School
20	(United States)	Emma Conner	Senior (RS)	F	5' 8" (1.73 m)	2002-10-01	Edina, Minnesota	Minnesota
21	(Canada)	Maxim Tremblay	Freshman	F	5' 9" (1.75 m)	2006-08-14	Sherbrooke, Quebec	Stanstead College
24	(United States)	Lauren Glaser	Sophomore	F	5' 3" (1.6 m)	2005-04-21	Marlborough, Massachusetts	Shattuck-St. Mary's
25	(United States)	Shea Frost	Freshman	D	5' 10" (1.78 m)	2004-07-27	Andover, Massachusetts	Cushing Academy
26	(United States)	Kiera Dempsey	Sophomore	D	5' 5" (1.65 m)	2006-01-02	Natick, Massachusetts	North American Hockey Academy
29	(United States)	Bailey Callaway	Junior	G	5' 9" (1.75 m)	2004-01-18	Jackson, Wyoming	Boston Jr. Eagles
30	(United States)	Bella Pomarico	Junior	G	5' 4" (1.63 m)	2004-00-00	Brentwood, New Hampshire	Berwick Academy
31	(United States)	Grace Campbell (C)	Senior	G	5' 7" (1.7 m)	2003-04-15	Kensington, Maryland	Shattuck-St. Mary's

== Awards and honors ==
- Ava Thomas: Hockey East Player of the Week (October 14, 2025)
- Grace Campbell: Hockey East Goaltender of the Week (October 14, 2025)
- Ava Thomas: Hockey East Player of the Month (October 2025)
- Grace Campbell: Hockey East Goaltender of the Week (November 11, 2025)
