= Boston College Eagles women's ice hockey =

- Current season
- University: Boston College
- Conference: HEA
- Head coach: Katie King-Crowley; 18th season, 400–175–62
- Assistant coaches: Courtney Kennedy
- Captain(s): Maegan Beres, Cayla Barnes, Kelly Browne
- Arena: Conte Forum; Chestnut Hill, Massachusetts
- Colors: Maroon and gold
- Fight song: For Boston

NCAA tournament runner-up
- 2016

NCAA tournament Frozen Four
- 2007, 2011, 2012, 2013, 2015, 2016, 2017

NCAA tournament appearances
- 2007, 2011, 2012, 2013, 2014, 2015, 2016, 2017, 2018, 2019, 2021

Conference tournament champions
- 2011, 2016, 2017

Conference regular season champions
- 2014, 2015, 2016, 2017, 2018

The Boston College Eagles women's ice hockey team represent Boston College in the NCAA and participate in Hockey East. The Eagles are coached by former Olympic gold medallist Katie King-Crowley and play their home games at Conte Forum. They have won the Hockey East championship three times, and made seven trips to the Frozen Four of the NCAA tournament.

== History ==
The Boston Eagles women's ice hockey program was launched in 1994, under head coach Tom O'Malley, who oversaw the development of the program for five years. In 1999, Tom Babson took the helm and coached for four seasons. In the early years, the team competed in the Eastern Collegiate Athletic Conference (ECAC) but struggled to build a competitive program, largely due to the school being generally unsupportive financially.

In 2002, they joined the newly formed Hockey East Conference for women's hockey. Tom Mutch was hired as the head coach in 2003, and the program began to see greater success, in part due to pressure from Boston University, whose women’s program was set to debut in 2006. The Eagles won their first Beanpot championship in 2006, and finished second in the conference that year. The following year, the team had its best season to-date, finishing 24–20–2, and qualifying for the NCAA championship tournament for the first time. The Eagles lost in the semi-finals to Minnesota-Duluth in double overtime.

Shortly after, on April 24, 2007, Tom Mutch resigned as head coach of the women's ice hockey program. The resignation came in the wake of an inappropriate relationship with Kelli Stack, a freshman who was the Hockey East Player and Rookie of the Year. The Boston Herald had printed an article earlier that day that detailed the alleged explicit text messaging that occurred between the married Tom Mutch and Stack. Mutch was forced to resign. Though a sexual relationship was never proven, the messages were said to be "filthy" by news reports at the time.

Katie King-Crowley, the Eagles assistant coach, was hired as head coach in May 2007. Courtney Kennedy became Associate head coach.

Under King-Crowley's leadership, the program became one of the most competitive in women's ice hockey. Originally from Salem, New Hampshire, she had a strong college career as a forward with Brown University. She competed in three Olympics with the U.S. National team, winning a gold medal in 1998, a silver in 2002, and a bronze in 2006. In thirteen seasons with King-Crowley as head coach, the Eagles have won three Hockey East tournament championships, lead the regular conference season four times, played in six NCAA Frozen Four tournaments, and competed in one NCAA championship final.

The 2010–2011 season was one of the first major successes in the program; the team would go on to win their first Hockey East title. In October, Taylor Wasylk was recognized as Hockey East Rookie of the Week for three consecutive weeks, the first time in Boston College Eagles women's ice hockey history that a player has won a league award for three consecutive weeks. Kelli Stack was the October 2010 Hockey East Player of the Month. She finished October 2010 with fifteen points (nine goals, six assists) in eight games for Boston College. Stack started every game at center and has accumulated points in every game. She finished the month leading the Eagles in points, goals, power play goals, and shorthanded goals. On October 31, she was involved in all three goals against Connecticut (one goal, two assists). She was part of all three goals scored at Vermont on October 15 (two goals, one assist). Against the Syracuse Orange (on October 9), Stack scored a hat trick. On February 8, 2011, with two points in the game against Boston University in the first round of the 2011 Beanpot Tournament, Kelli Stack accumulated 199 points in her career and broke BC's all-time career points record, becoming the new program leader. On March 6, 2011, the Eagles beat the Northeastern Huskies by a 3–1 tally to claim their first Hockey East Tournament championship.

In 2014–2015, the Eagles received their first #1 ranking, after starting the season undefeated. They posted a 27–0–1 record before losing a game, and went undefeated in conference play. The Eagles returned to the NCAA Frozen Four, losing in the semi-final. Alex Carpenter became the first Boston College player to win the Patty Kazmaier Award. She accumulated 81 points during the season, scoring 37 goals and registering 44 assists. King-Crowley won the national Coach of the Year award.

In 2016–2017, the Eagles coaching staff was the only all-female staff in college ice hockey. King-Crowley and Kennedy were joined by assistants Gilian Apps and Alison Quandt.

In 2017–2018, BC won their third straight Beanpot in the annual tournament held in February. They won a fifth straight Hockey East title, and established their best record at 30–5–3.

Daryl Watts would follow Carpenter as the second Patty Kazmaier Award winner in Eagles history, capturing the award in 2018. Watts’ end-to-end shorthanded goal against the University of New Hampshire was also recognized among the BC Eagles Athletics’ Top 10 Plays of the 2017–18 season, placing second. Winning both the Hockey East Player and Rookie of the Year Awards, she became only the second player in conference history to do so, tying a mark set by former Boston College player Kelli Stack in 2006. In 2019, fans were shocked by the sudden departure of Watts, who transferred to the Wisconsin Badgers mid-season.

== Season-by-season results ==
Won championship	Lost championship	Conference champions	League leader

Season	Coach	W	L	T	Conference	Conf. W	Conf. L	Conf. T	Finish	Conference Tournament	NCAA Tournament
2022–23	Katie King Crowley	20	15	1	Hockey East	16	11	0	4th HE	Won Quarterfinals vs. Connecticut (4–3 OT); Lost Semifinals vs. Northeastern (0–3)	Did not qualify
2021–22	Katie King Crowley	19	14	1	Hockey East	16	9	1	4th HE	Lost Quarterfinals vs. Maine (1–2)	Did not qualify
2020–2021	Katie King Crowley	14	6	0	Hockey East	14	4	0	2nd HE	Lost Quarterfinals vs. University of Connecticut (1–5)	Lost First Round vs. Ohio State (1–3)
2019–2020	Katie King Crowley	17	16	3	Hockey East	14	11	2	4th HE	Lost Quarterfinals vs. University of Connecticut (4–2, 2–0,2–1)	Did not qualify
2018–2019	Katie King Crowley	26	12	1	Hockey East	19	7	1	2nd HE	Won Quarterfinals vs. Connecticut (4–1, 5–4 OT); Won Semifinals vs. Boston University, (5–1); Lost Championship vs. Northeastern (2–3 OT)	Lost First Round vs. Clarkson (1–2 OT)
2017–2018	Katie King Crowley	30	5	3	Hockey East	19	2	3	1st HE	Won Quarterfinals vs. Vermont (3–1, 6–1); Lost Semifinals vs. Connecticut, (2–4)	Lost First Round vs. Ohio State (0–2)
2016–2017	Katie King Crowley	28	6	5	Hockey East	17	4	3	1st HE	Won Quarterfinals vs. Merrimack (4–0, 1–0); Won Semifinals vs. Vermont, (4–32OT); Won Championship vs. Northeastern (5–0OT)	Won First Round vs. St. Lawrence (6–0); Lost Frozen Four vs. Wisconsin (0–1)
2015–2016	Katie King Crowley	40	1	0	Hockey East	24	0	0	1st HE	Won Quarterfinals vs. Maine (5–2, 5–1); Won Semifinals vs. Connecticut (4–2); Won Championship vs. Boston University (5–0)	Won First Round vs. Northeastern (5–1); Won Frozen Four vs. Clarkson (3–2 OT); Lost Championship vs. Minnesota (1–3)
2014–15	Katie King Crowley	34	3	2	Hockey East	21	0	1	1st HE	Won Quarterfinals vs. Providence (6–2, 8–0); Won Semifinals vs. Connecticut (3–1); Lost Championship vs. Boston University (1–4)	Won First Round vs. Clarkson (5–1); Lost Frozen Four vs. Harvard (1–2)
2013–14	Katie King Crowley	27	7	3	Hockey East	19	2	1	1st HE	Won Quarterfinals vs. New Hampshire (8–1); Won Semifinals vs. Vermont (3–1); Lost Championship vs. Boston University (2–3)	Lost First Round vs. Clarkson (1–3)
2012–13	Katie King Crowley	28	6	3	Hockey East	18	2	2	2nd HE	Won Quarterfinals vs. Maine (2–1 OT); Lost Semifinals vs. Northeastern (1–4)	Won First Round vs. Harvard (3–1); Lost Frozen Four vs. Minnesota (2–3 OT)
2011–12	Katie King Crowley	24	10	3	Hockey East	15	4	2	2nd HE	Lost Semifinals vs. Boston University (2–5)	Won First Round vs. St. Lawrence (6–3); Lost Frozen Four vs. Wisconsin (2–6)
2010–11	Katie King	24	7	6	Hockey East	13	4	4	2nd HE	Won Semifinals vs. Providence (3–2 OT); Won Championship vs. Northeastern (3–1)	Won First Round vs. Minnesota (4–1); Lost Frozen Four vs. Wisconsin (2–3)
2009–10	Katie King	8	17	10	Hockey East	7	10	4	6th HE	Lost Quarterfinals vs. Boston University (1–3)	Did not qualify
2008–09	Katie King	22	9	5	Hockey East	13	5	3	2nd HE	Won Semifinals vs. Boston University (3–2); Lost Championship vs. New Hampshire (1–2)	Lost First Round vs. Minnesota (3–4)
2007–08	Katie King	14	13	7	Hockey East	9	9	3	5th HE	Did not qualify	Did not qualify
2006–07	Tom Mutch	24	10	2	Hockey East	15	6	0	2nd HE	Lost Semifinals vs. Providence (2–3)	Won First Round vs. Dartmouth (3–2 2OT); Lost Frozen Four vs. Minnesota-Duluth (3–4 2OT)
2005–06	Tom Mutch	20	11	4	Hockey East	16	4	1	2nd HE	Won Semifinals vs. Providence (3–1); Lost Championship vs. New Hampshire (0–6)	Did not qualify
2004–05	Tom Mutch	10	20	4	Hockey East	6	11	3	4th HE	Lost Semifinals vs. Providence (1–9)	Did not qualify
2003–04	Tom Mutch	6	22	3	Hockey East	1	18	1	6th HE	Did not qualify	Did not qualify
2002–03	Tom Babson	12	17	3	Hockey East	2	10	3	6th HE	Did not qualify	Did not qualify
2001–02	Tom Babson	9	19	4	ECAC Eastern	5	13	3	7th ECAC E.	Lost Quarterfinals vs. Northeastern (0–4)	Did not qualify
2000–01	Tom Babson	6	26	0	ECAC	1	23	0	13th ECAC	Did not qualify	Did not qualify
1999-00	Tom Babson	6	22	2	ECAC	1	21	2	13th ECAC	Did not qualify	Did not qualify
1998–99	Tom O'Malley	8	22	2	ECAC	4	20	2	12th ECAC	Did not qualify	Did not qualify
1997–98	Tom O'Malley	10	22	1						Did not qualify	Did not qualify
1996–97	Tom O'Malley	9	20	1						Did not qualify	Did not qualify
1995–96	Tom O'Malley	9	16	2						Did not qualify	Did not qualify
1994–95	Tom O'Malley	15	10	1						Did not qualify	Did not qualify
Totals	4 coaches	27 seasons	480–355–80	.568							

== Current roster ==
As of September 26, 2025.

No.	Nat.	Player	Class	Pos	Height	DoB	Hometown	Previous team
2	(United States)	Madelyn Murphy	Freshman	D	5' 8" (1.73 m)	2007-04-24	Dorchester, Massachusetts	Dexter Southfield School
3	(United States)	Alanna Devlin	Sophomore	F	5' 5" (1.65 m)	2006-07-31	Marshfield, Massachusetts	North American Hockey Academy
4	(United States)	Alaina Dunn	Freshman	D	5' 7" (1.7 m)	2007-04-20	Walpole, Massachusetts	Dexter Southfield School
6	(United States)	Emily Mara	Freshman	F	5' 6" (1.68 m)	2007-02-27	Winchester, Massachusetts	Phillips Academy
7	(United States)	Kate Ham	Freshman	F	5' 8" (1.73 m)	2003-06-29	Hingham, Massachusetts	Noble and Greenough School
8	(United States)	Kara Goulding	Freshman	F	5' 8" (1.73 m)	2003-11-06	Belmont, Massachusetts	Dexter Southfield School
9	(United States)	Maude Niemann	Freshman	F	5' 8" (1.73 m)	2006-12-14	Weston, Connecticut	St. Paul's School
10	(United States)	Jansen Lucas	Junior	F	5' 6" (1.68 m)	2005-00-00	Gunnison, Colorado	New Hampton School
11	(United States)	Ava Thomas	Freshman	F	5' 7" (1.7 m)	2006-09-27	Downingtown, Pennsylvania	Philadelphia Jr. Flyers
12	(United States)	Cailin Flynn	Freshman	D	5' 9" (1.75 m)	2003-03-31	Woburn, Massachusetts	Dexter Southfield School
13	(United States)	Jamie Griswold	Sophomore	D	5' 11" (1.8 m)	2006-05-03	Concord, Massachusetts	Noble and Greenough School
14	(United States)	Sammy Taber	Junior	F	5' 5" (1.65 m)	2005-06-13	Tewksbury, Massachusetts	Cushing Academy
16	(United States)	Tricia Piku	Sophomore	F	5' 7" (1.7 m)	2005-02-00	Harrison Township, Michigan	Lakeview High School
17	(United States)	Olivia Maffeo	Sophomore	D	5' 4" (1.63 m)	2005-03-28	Canton, Massachusetts	Noble and Greenough School
18	(Canada)	Sage Babey	Sophomore	F	5' 8" (1.73 m)	2006-08-08	Saskatoon, Saskatchewan	Merrimack
19	(United States)	Jade Arnone (C)	Senior	D	5' 11" (1.8 m)	2004-05-04	Sherborn, Massachusetts	St. Paul's School
20	(United States)	Emma Conner	Senior (RS)	F	5' 8" (1.73 m)	2002-10-01	Edina, Minnesota	Minnesota
21	(Canada)	Maxim Tremblay	Freshman	F	5' 9" (1.75 m)	2006-08-14	Sherbrooke, Quebec	Stanstead College
24	(United States)	Lauren Glaser	Sophomore	F	5' 3" (1.6 m)	2005-04-21	Marlborough, Massachusetts	Shattuck-St. Mary's
25	(United States)	Shea Frost	Freshman	D	5' 10" (1.78 m)	2004-07-27	Andover, Massachusetts	Cushing Academy
26	(United States)	Kiera Dempsey	Sophomore	D	5' 5" (1.65 m)	2006-01-02	Natick, Massachusetts	North American Hockey Academy
29	(United States)	Bailey Callaway	Junior	G	5' 9" (1.75 m)	2004-01-18	Jackson, Wyoming	Boston Jr. Eagles
30	(United States)	Bella Pomarico	Junior	G	5' 4" (1.63 m)	2004-00-00	Brentwood, New Hampshire	Berwick Academy
31	(United States)	Grace Campbell (C)	Freshman	G	5' 7" (1.7 m)	2003-04-15	Kensington, Maryland	Shattuck-St. Mary's

== Awards and honors ==
- Kara Goulding, Finalist, 2026 Hockey Humanitarian Award
- Hannah Bilka, 2020 Women's Hockey Commissioners Association National Rookie of the Year, and 2020 Hockey East Rookie of the Year
- Molly Barrow, 2019 Distinguished Fellow, Hockey East All Academic team (awarded for making the All Academic Team for all four years)
- Daryl Watts, 2018 Women's Hockey Commissioners Association National Rookie of the Year
- Katie King, 2015 AHCA Women's Ice Hockey Division I Coach of the Year
- Blake Bolden, 2011 Hockey East All-Tournament team
- Kiera Kingston, Bauer/Hockey East Goaltender of the Month, February 2010
- Ashley Motherwell, 2010 WHEA All-Rookie Team
- Molly Schaus, 2011 Bertagna Goaltending Award
- Kelli Stack, 2011 Hockey East All-Tournament team
- Kelli Stack, 2011 Hockey East Tournament Most Valuable Player
- Allie Thunstrom, 2010 WHEA Second-Team All-Star
- Allie Thunstrom, Frozen Four Skills Competition participant

=== Beanpot ===
- Mary Restuccia, 2011 Beanpot MVP

=== Patty Kazmaier Award ===
- Alex Carpenter, 2015 Patty Kazmaier Award recipient
- Daryl Watts, 2018 recipient

=== All-Americans ===
- Molly Schaus, 2011 First Team All-America selection
- Kelli Stack, 2011 Second Team All-America selection
- Alex Carpenter, 2015 First-Team All-America selection
- Megan Keller, 2016–17 AHCA-CCM Women's University Division I All-American
- Daryl Watts, 2018 First-Team All-America selection
- Caitrin Lonergan, 2018 Second-Team All-America selection
- Toni Ann Miano, 2018 Second-Team All-America selection
- Cayla Barnes, 2020–21 Second Team CCM/AHCA All-American

=== Hockey East ===
- Kelli Stack, 2010–11 Cammi Granato Award (Hockey East Player of the Year)

Rookie of the Year

- Hannah Bilka, 2019 Hockey East Rookie of the Year
- Abby Newhook, 2022 Hockey East Rookie of the Year

==== Defensive Player of the Month ====
- Corinne Boyles, Hockey East Goaltender of the Month (Month of December 2011)
- Katie Burt, Hockey East Defensive Player of the Month (December 2014)
- Katie Burt, Hockey East Defensive Player of the Month (January 2015)

==== Player of the Month ====
- Kelli Stack, Hockey East Pure Hockey Player of the Month (October 2010)
- Alex Carpenter, Hockey East Player of the Month (November 2014)
- Haley Skarupa, Hockey East Player of the Month (December 2014)

==== Rookie of the Month ====
- Katie Burt, Hockey East Rookie of the Month (December 2014)
- Alex Carpenter, Hockey East Rookie of the Month (Month of December 2011)
- Kenzie Kent, Hockey East Rookie of the Month (November 2014)

==== All-Rookie Team ====
- Gaby Roy, 2021 Hockey East All-Rookie Team

==== All-Stars ====
- Alex Carpenter, 2014–15 Hockey East First Team All-Star
- Alex Carpenter, 2015–2016 Hockey East First Team All-Star
- Megan Keller, 2014–15 Hockey East First Team All-Star
- Megan Keller, 2015–2016 Hockey East First Team All-Star
- Emily Pfalzer, 2014–15 Hockey East First Team All-Star
- Lexi Bender, 2015–16 Hockey East First Team All-Star
- Haley Skarupa, 2015–16 Hockey East First Team All-Star

==== Weekly awards ====
- Taylor Wasylk, Hockey East Rookie of the Week (Week of October 11, 2010)
- Taylor Wasylk, Hockey East Rookie of the Week (Week of October 18, 2010)
- Taylor Wasylk, Hockey East Rookie of the Week (Week of October 25, 2010)

=== Hockey Commissioners Association ===
- Gaby Roy, Hockey Commissioners Association Women’s Player of the Month (November 2020)

=== New England hockey awards ===
- Kelli Stack, 2010–11 New England Women's Player of the Year
- Mary Restuccia, 2010–11 New England Women's Division I All-Stars
- Molly Schaus, 2010–11 New England Women's Division I All-Stars
- Kelli Stack, 2010–11 New England Women's Division I All-Stars
- Daryl Watts, 2017–18 First Team Hockey East

=== BC honors ===
- Daryl Watts, 2018 Boston College Athletics Female Rookie of the Year Award

== Eagles in professional hockey ==
= CWHL All-Star	= NWHL All-Star	= Clarkson Cup Champion	= Isobel Cup Champion	= Walter Cup Champion

Player	Position	Team(s)	League(s)	Years	Clarkson Cup	Isobel Cup	Walter Cup
Cayla Barnes	Defense	Montreal Victoire Seattle Torrent	PWHL				
Delaney Belinskas	Forward	Boston Pride	PHF			1 (2022)	
Hannah Bilka	Forward	Boston Fleet Seattle Torrent	PWHL				
Blake Bolden	Defense	Boston Blades; Boston Pride; HC Lugano Ladies; Buffalo Beauts; PWHPA Buffalo	CWHL; NWHL; SWHL; NWHL; PWHPA		1 (2015)	1 (2016)	
Dru Burns	Defense	Boston Pride	PHF				
Kaitlin Burt	Goaltender	Boston Pride; Dream Gap Tour	PHF; PWHPA first pick in 2017 NWHL Draft			1 (2022)	
Alex Carpenter	Forward	Boston Pride; Shenzhen KRS Vanke Rays; New York Sirens Seattle Torrent	PHF; CWHL first pick in 2015 NWHL Draft; PWHL				
Kali Flanagan	Defense	Boston Pride; Toronto Sceptres	PHF; PWHL			1 (2022)	
Meghan Grieves	Forward	Worcester Blades; Dream Gap Tour	CWHL; PWHPA	4			
Megan Keller	Defense	Dream Gap Tour Boston Fleet	PWHPA PWHL				
Katelyn Kurth	Forward	Boston Blades	CWHL	2			
Abbey Levy	Goaltender	New York Sirens Boston Fleet	PWHL				
Caitrin Lonergan	Forward	Connecticut Whale	PHF				
Abby Newhook	Forward	Boston Fleet	PWHL				
Molly Schaus	Goaltender	Boston Blades	CWHL	2	1 (2013)		
Kelli Stack	Forward	Boston Blades; Connecticut Whale; Kunlun Red Star	CWHL; PHF; CWHL		1 (2013)		
Allie Thunstrom	Forward	Minnesota Whitecaps; Boston Pride	PHF	5		1 (2019)	
Daryl Watts	Forward	Toronto Six; Ottawa Charge; Toronto Sceptres	PHF; PWHL			1 (2023)	
