= St. Joseph Catholic Church (Boston) =

Church in Boston, Massachusetts

Coordinates: 42.3631°N 71.0654°W

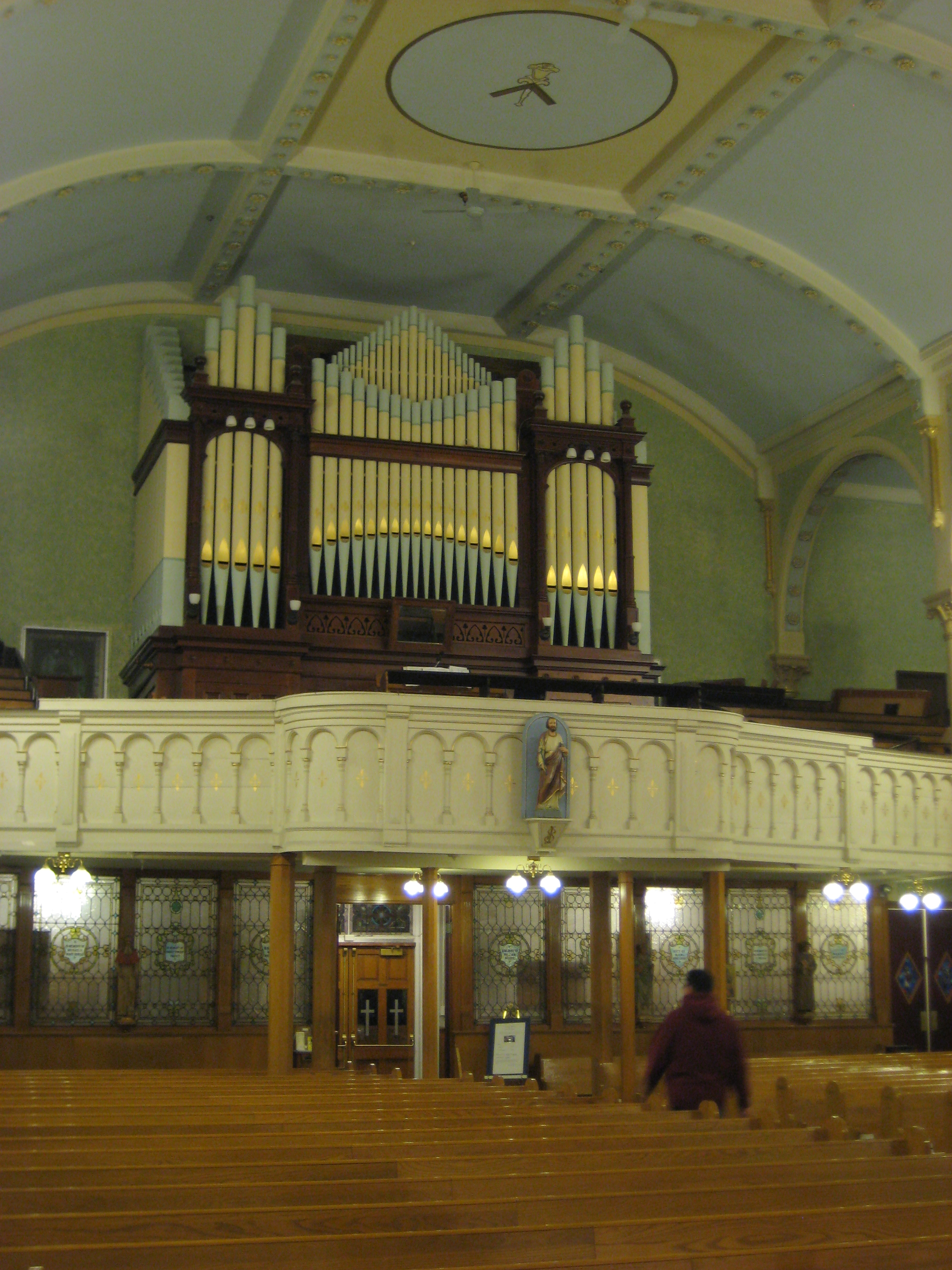
Organ and choir loft of St. Joseph Catholic Church

St. Joseph Catholic Church is a Roman Catholic church serving Beacon Hill and the West End in Boston, Massachusetts. Designed by Alexander Parris and built in 1834 for the Twelfth Congregational Society, it was purchased by the Boston Roman Catholic Diocese in 1862.

The first recorded Mass in the neighborhood was on March 17, 1732, in a private home near the current site of this church. Represented by the many decorative fleur-de-lis inside, the first Catholic Mass legislatively sanctioned and celebrated in New England was celebrated nearby by Father de la Porterie in 1788.

Designed by Alexander Parris (architect of Quincy Market), and constructed in 1834, the building was consecrated as St. Joseph's in 1862. At the time, the West End community was diverse, consisting of working-class families of predominantly European descent.

The crucifixion painting is thought to have been transferred from the Old Cathedral on Franklin Street to St. Joseph's in 1862. It is an enlarged replica painted by Lawrence Sargent (1803) of the original by Pierre-Paul Prud'hon (1758), housed at the Louvre in Paris.

The Hook and Hastings pipe organ was installed in 1884, and, with its characteristic full-bodied sound, it is still in use today.

The parish witnessed urban renewal in the 1950s and 1960s, which significantly changed the community.

At the centennial anniversary of the parish, twenty flags from countries around the world, including the United States and the Vatican, were displayed from the balconies to represent the diversity of the parish.

Regular Mass Schedule: Sunday 9:00 AM, 4:00 PM Monday, Wednesday, Friday 12:10 PM
