= Tom Mutch =

American ice hockey coach (born 1967)

Biographical details
- Born: June 16, 1967 (age 59); Canton, Massachusetts, U.S.
- Education: Northeastern University

Playing career
- 1986–1990: Northeastern
- 1990–1991: Cincinnati Cyclones
- 1991–1992: Flint Bulldogs
- 1992–1994: Memphis RiverKings
- 1994: Fort Worth Fire
- Position: Right Wing

Coaching career (HC unless noted)
- 1994–1996: Northeastern (assistant)
- 1996–1998: U.S. Women's national team (assistant)
- 1998–2000: Omaha Lancers (assistant)
- 2000–2002: Nebraska-Omaha (assistant)
- 2002–2003: Northeastern (assistant)
- 2003–2007: Boston College

Head coaching record
- Overall: 60-63-13 (.489)

Accomplishments and honors

Championships
- 2x Women's Beanpot (2006, 2007)

Awards
- Hockey East Coach of the Year (2005, 2007)

Tom Mutch (born June 16, 1967) is an American former ice hockey coach of the Boston College women's ice hockey team.

== Playing career ==
Mutch played his college career with the Northeastern University Huskies from 1986 to 1988. Afterward, he played professionally in the East Coast Hockey League, Colonial Hockey League, and the Central Hockey League, before retiring for good in 1994.

== Coaching career ==
Mutch served as an assistant coach on the United States national women's ice hockey team, where he started his career as a women's hockey coach in 1996. During his time as assistant coach, the national team won gold at the 1998 Winter Olympics.

Mutch also served as an assistant coach with men's hockey with the Omaha Lancers, the University of Nebraska-Omaha, and his alma mater, Northeastern.

== Boston College women's ice hockey ==
In four years as head coach of the women's ice hockey program at Boston College, Mutch continued building what had, only a few years before, been an afterthought of a program.

During the 2006–2007 season, Mutch led the Boston College Eagles to their first ever NCAA Frozen Four appearance. Additionally, he led the Eagles to the first Beanpot Tournament Trophy in 2006, and repeated in 2007.

Mutch was named Hockey East Coach of the Year for his work with Boston College in 2005 and 2007.

=== Resignation and scandal ===
On April 24, 2007, Mutch resigned as head coach of the women's ice hockey program. The resignation came in the wake of an inappropriate relationship with Kelli Stack, a freshman who was the Hockey East Player and Rookie of the Year. The Boston Herald had printed an article earlier that day that detailed the alleged explicit text messaging that occurred between the married Tom Mutch and Stack.

== Head coaching record ==
Record table
Season	Team	Overall	Conference	Standing	Postseason
Boston College Eagles (Hockey East) (2003–2007)
2003–04	Boston College	6-22-3	1-18-1	6th	
2004–05	Boston College	10-20-4	6-11-3	4th	HE Semifinalist
2005–06	Boston College	20-11-4	16-4-1	2nd	HE Runner-Up
2006–07	Boston College	24-10-2	15-6-0	2nd	HE Semifinalist; Frozen Four Runner-Up
Boston College:		60-63-13	38-39-5		
Total:		60-63-13			
National champion Postseason invitational champion Conference regular season champion Conference regular season and conference tournament champion Division regular season champion Division regular season and conference tournament champion Conference tournament champion
