= Saddleback Ledge Light =

Lighthouse in Maine, US

Saddleback Ledge Light Saddleback Ledge Light
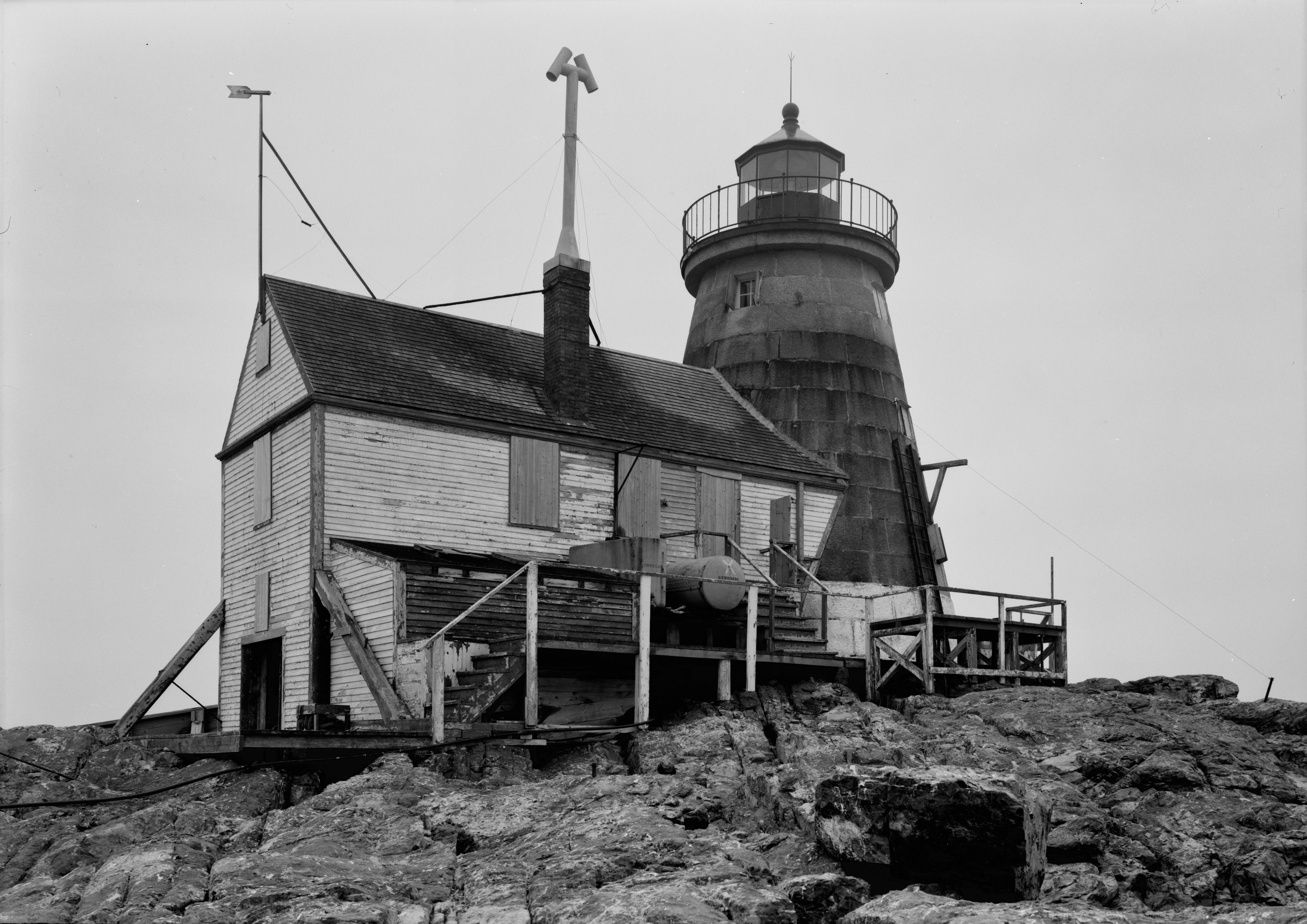
- Historic American Buildings Survey photo, July 1960
- Location: west of Isle au Haut, Maine
- Coordinates: 44°0′51.697″N 68°43′35.217″W

Tower
- Constructed: 1839
- Automated: 1954
- Height: 13 m (43 ft)
- Shape: Conical Granite Tower
- Markings: Gray
- Heritage: National Register of Historic Places listed place
- Fog signal: HORN: 1 every 10s

Light
- Focal height: 54 feet (16 m)
- Lens: 12 inches (300 mm)
- Range: 9 nautical miles (17 km; 10 mi)
- Characteristic: Fl W 6s
- Saddleback Ledge Light Station
- U.S. National Register of Historic Places
- Nearest city: Vinalhaven, Maine
- Area: 2 acres (0.81 ha)
- Architect: Alexander Parris
- MPS: Light Stations of Maine MPS
- NRHP reference No.: 88000158
- Added to NRHP: March 14, 1988

Saddleback Ledge Light is a lighthouse on Saddleback Ledge, an islet lying between Isle au Haut and Vinalhaven, Maine, in the middle of the southeastern entrance to Penobscot Bay. The station was established and the current structure, designed by Alexander Parris, was built in 1839. One of Maine's oldest lighthouses, it was listed on the National Register of Historic Places as Saddleback Ledge Light Station on March 14, 1988.

== Description and history ==
Saddleback Ledge is a rocky outcrop located roughly midway between Isle au Haut and Vinalhaven Island on the east side of Penobscot Bay. The lighthouse on it marks the entrance to the bay's main eastern passage. The light station consists of a single structure, a conical tower 36 feet (11 m) in height, built out of cut granite and topped by a ten-sided lantern house surrounded by an iron deck and railing. The interior of the tower has space for the keeper's quarters and supply storage, and has narrow vertical windows on its east and west faces.

The light station was authorized in 1839, and the tower was built that year to a design by Alexander Parris. It is one of five lighthouses in the state whose design is attributed to Parris. The station at one point in the 19th-century had a wood-frame addition, which doubled as a boathouse, but that has long since been removed. The lantern house, deck, and railing all date to 1883. The light was the second to be placed on Penobscot Bay. It was automated in 1954.

== See also ==
- National Register of Historic Places listings in Knox County, Maine
