= Somerset Club =

Private social club in Boston, Massachusetts

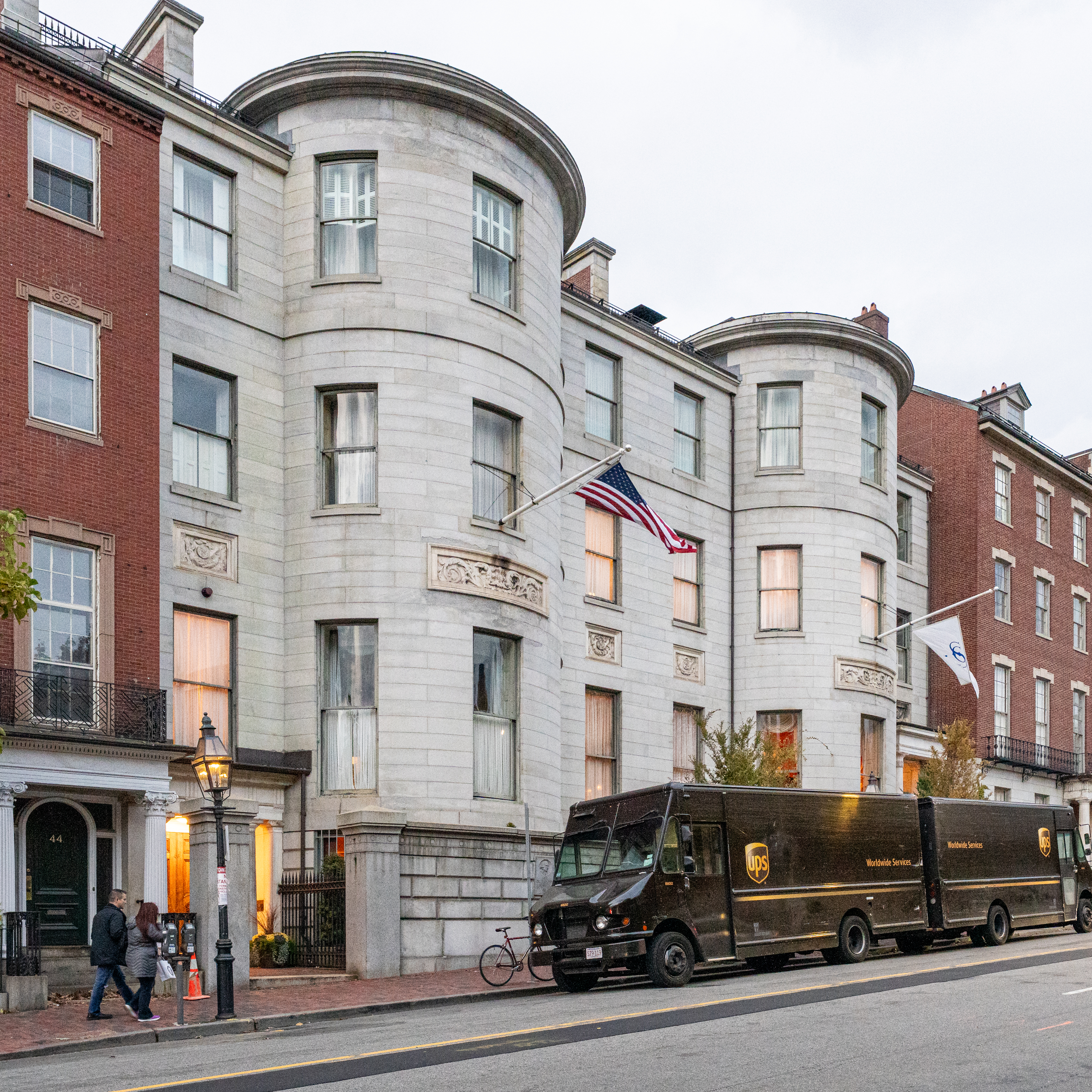
Somerset Club, 42–43 Beacon Street

The Somerset Club is a private social club in Boston, Massachusetts that opened to members in 1852, but had origins in related associations dating back to 1826. It is a center of Boston Brahmin families - New England's upper class - and is known as one of the big four clubs in the country, the other three being the Knickerbocker Club in New York, the Metropolitan Club in Washington D.C, and the Pacific-Union Club in San Francisco.

The Club is organized under 501(c)(7) Social and Recreation Clubs; in 2025 it claimed total revenue of $3,181,285 and total assets of $15,616,128. The separate Somerset Club Charitable Trust is a 501(c)(3) Private Operating Foundation granting "awards to people who are rendering or have rendered service to the Somerset Club and their immediate family who are in need of financial assistance due to old age, sickness, accident, or misfortune." In 2025 it claimed total revenue of $5,202 and total assets of $243,031.

== History ==
The original club was informal, without a clubhouse. By the 1830s this had evolved into a group called the Temple as it was on Temple Street. In 1851 the group purchased the home of Benjamin W. Crowninshield, located at the corner of Beacon and Somerset Streets. Originally called the Beacon Club, it was renamed the Somerset Club in 1852.

During the Civil War, members of the Somerset Club split along political lines. Somerset defectors formed the Union Club of Boston in 1863, which demanded "unqualified loyalty to the constitution and the Union of our United States, and unwavering support of the Federal Government in effort for the suppression of the rebellion."

In 1871 the Somerset Club purchased the David Sears townhouse at 42 Beacon Street on Beacon Hill. Originally designed by Alexander Parris and built in 1819, Sears had added to the house in 1832 and had built the adjacent Crowninshield-Amory house at 43 Beacon Street for his daughter. The land on which the house stood was originally part of an 18-acre (73,000 m^{2}) parcel owned by John Singleton Copley, who called it "his farm on Beacon Street." Eventually the Club bought 43 Beacon Street and joined the two houses into one large clubhouse.

A rare public notice of the club came in 1945, when it caught on fire. The visiting firefighters were requested to use the service entrance.

== See also ==
- List of American gentlemen's clubs
- Boston Brahmins
