= Alexander Parris =

American architect (1780–1852)

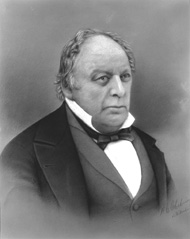
- Born: November 24, 1780; Halifax, Massachusetts, U.S.
- Died: June 16, 1852 (aged 71); Pembroke, Massachusetts, U.S.
- Occupation: Architect
- Parent(s): Mercy Thompson; Matthew Parris
- Buildings: Virginia Executive Mansion; Quincy Market

Alexander Parris (November 24, 1780 – June 16, 1852) was a prominent American architect-engineer. Beginning as a housewright, he evolved into an architect whose work transitioned from Federal style architecture to the later Greek Revival. Parris taught Ammi B. Young, and was among the group of architects influential in founding what would become the American Institute of Architects. He is also responsible for the designs of many lighthouses along the coastal Northeastern United States.

== Early life and work ==
Parris was born in Halifax, Massachusetts. At the age of 16, he apprenticed to a housewright in Pembroke, but talent led him towards architecture. Married to Silvina Bonney Stetson in 1800, he moved to Portland, Maine, which was then experiencing a building boom. The city had been bombarded during the Revolution by the Royal Navy, reducing three-quarters to ashes in 1775. But following the war, its trade recovered, almost challenging Boston as the busiest port in New England. Parris received numerous residential and commercial commissions, working in the fashionable style of architect Charles Bulfinch. Like most housewrights of the era, he often used elements derived directly from English architectural books, or those published in the United States by Asher Benjamin. Unfortunately, some of his designs were lost in the Great Fire of 1866, but early photographs and Parris' surviving drawings bespeak works of neoclassical artistry and taste.

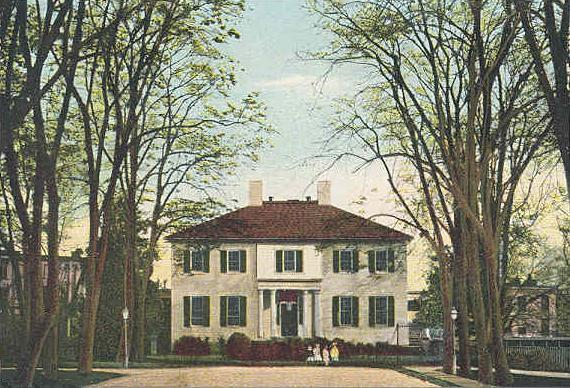
The Executive Mansion at Richmond, Virginia, c. 1905

The boom would end, however, with Jefferson's Embargo of 1807, which lasted 14 months and devastated Portland's mercantile base. Merchants went bankrupt. The Portland Bank, its building designed by Parris, failed. By 1809, construction in the city had come to a halt. Parris left for Richmond, Virginia, where he designed the Wickham House and the Executive Mansion. But architect Benjamin Latrobe examined Parris' preliminary plans for the Wickham House, which resembled his previous Federal style works in Portland, and gave it a blistering review. Latrobe's advice left a profound imprint on the future work of Parris, beginning with the building's revised design. Consequently, the Wickham House is considered a watershed design by Parris, marking the shift from his earlier Adamesque period towards his later, more severe, monumental and architectonic period. In the War of 1812, he served in Plattsburgh, New York as a Captain of the Artificers (engineers), gaining knowledge of military requirements for engineering.

== Boston and federal patronage ==
In 1815, he moved to Boston, where he found a position in the office of Charles Bulfinch. Like his famous employer, Parris produced refined residences, churches and commercial buildings. When in 1817 Bulfinch was called to Washington to work on the U.S. Capitol Building, Parris helped complete the Bulfinch Building home of the Ether Dome at Massachusetts General Hospital. With Bulfinch's departure, Parris soon became the city's leading architect, and a proponent of what would be called "Boston Granite Style", with austere, monolithic stonework. Around 1818-1823 he kept an office on Court Street. He belonged to the Massachusetts Charitable Mechanic Association.

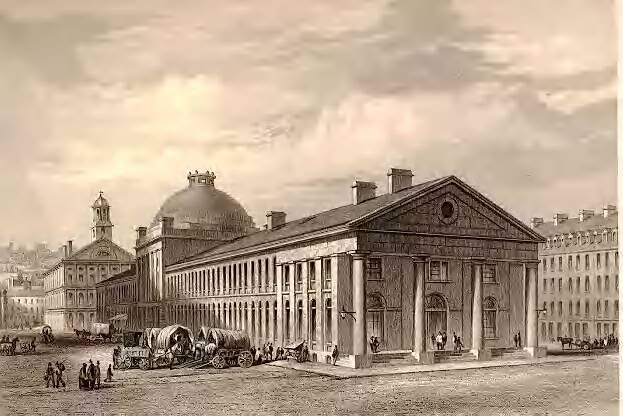
Quincy Market in 1830, Boston, Massachusetts

In 1824, however, he began a twenty-year association working for the Boston Navy Yard in Charlestown. He would end his career as chief engineer at the Portsmouth Naval Shipyard in Kittery, Maine. With the federal government as patron, Parris produced plans for numerous utilitarian structures, from storehouses to ropewalks, and was superintendent of construction at one of the nation's first drydocks, located at the Charlestown base. Today, he is fondly remembered for his stalwart stone lighthouses, commissioned by the U.S. Treasury Department. They are often of a tapered form termed "windswept."

Parris balanced the delicacy of his "superb draftsmanship", as it was called, with the coarseness of his building material of choice: granite. His most famous building, Quincy Market, is made of it. Parris died in Pembroke, where he is interred in the Briggs Burying Ground.

== Designs ==
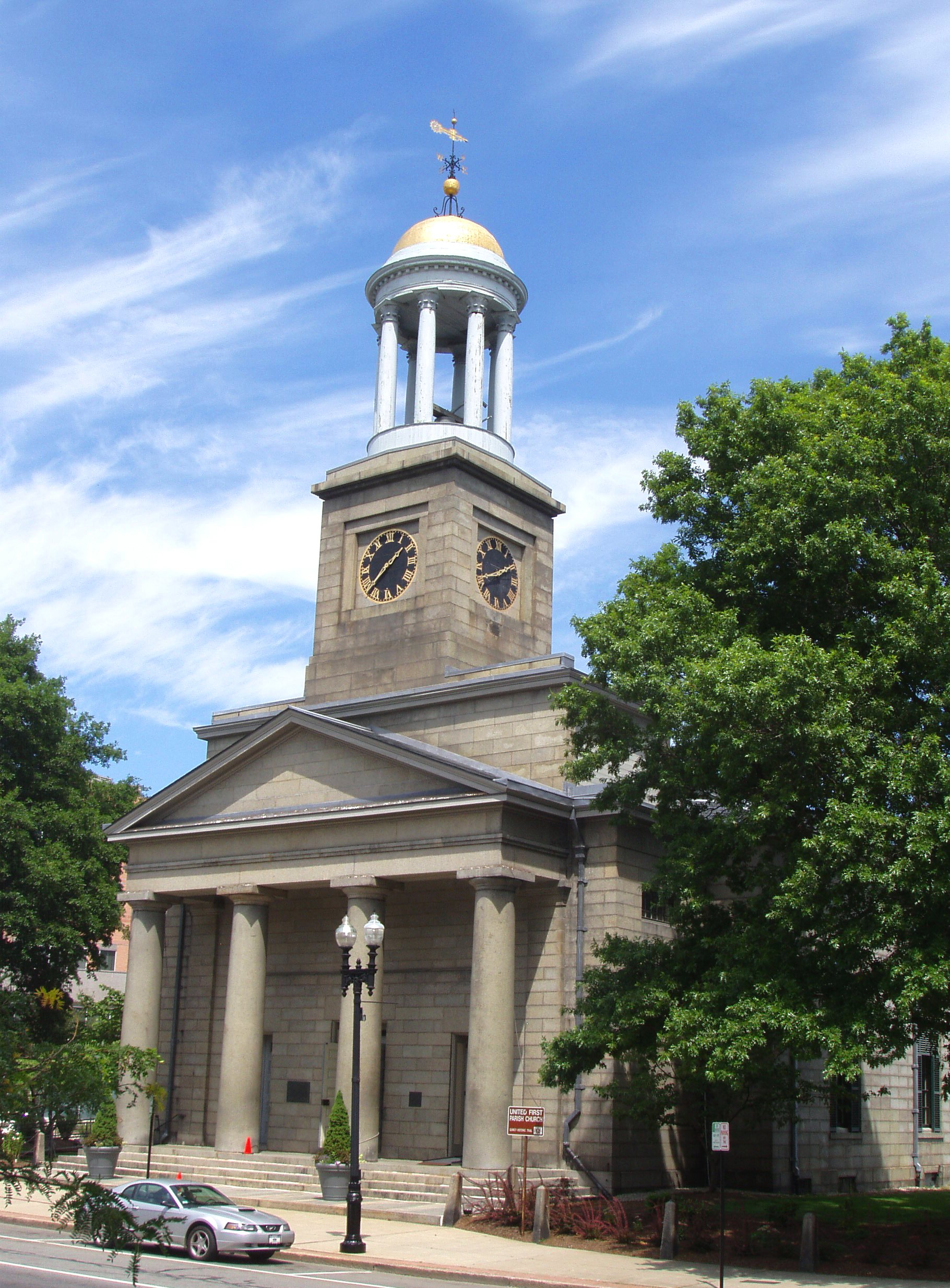
United First Parish Church, 1828, Quincy, Massachusetts -- exterior

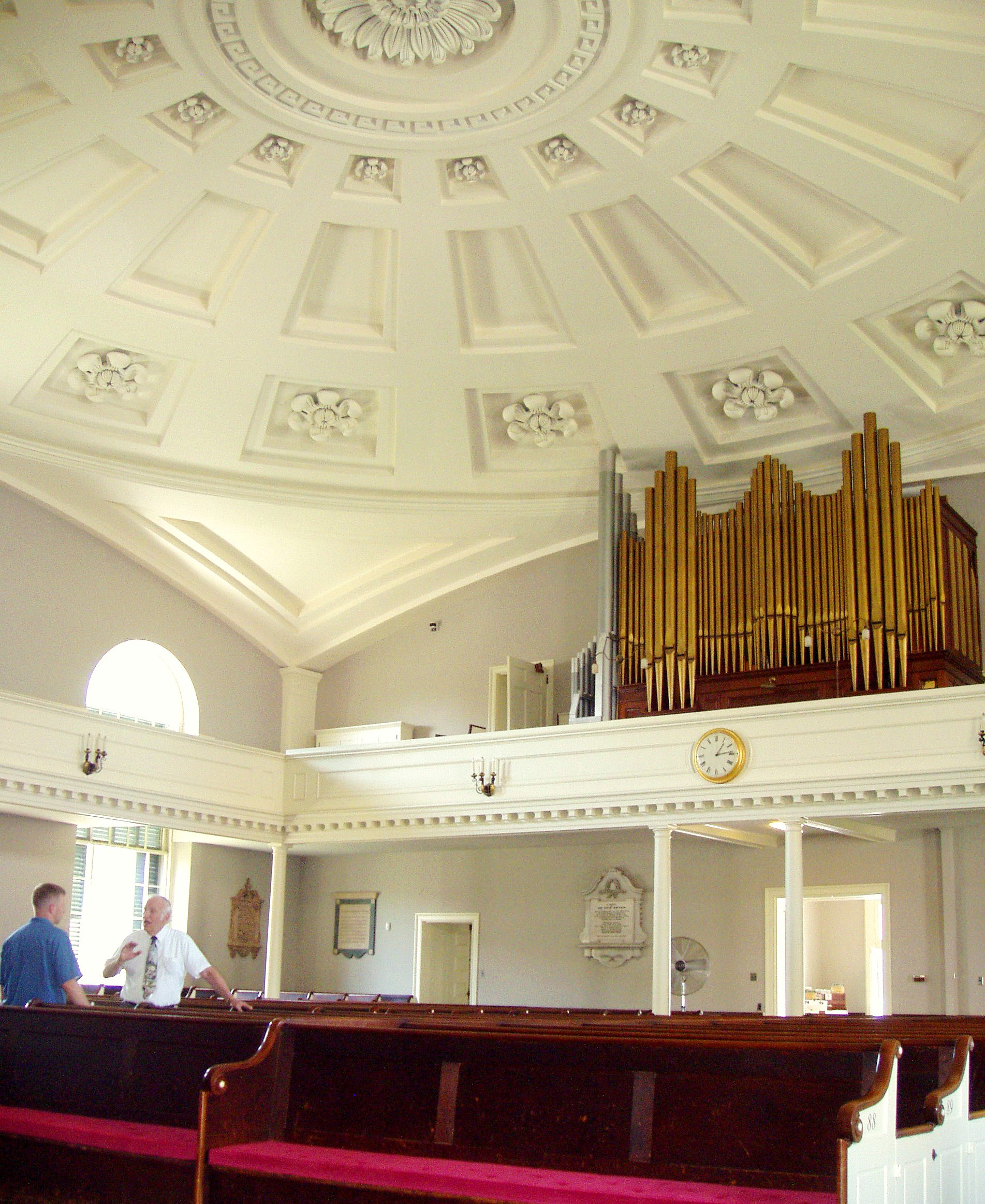
-- and interior

- 1801 - Joseph Holt Ingraham House, Portland, Maine
- 1803-1804 - Maine Fire & Marine Insurance Company Building, Portland, Maine
- 1804 - James Deering House, Portland, Maine
- 1805 - Commodore Edward Preble House, Portland, Maine
- 1805 - Hunnewell-Shepley House, Portland, Maine
- 1806-1807 - Portland Bank, Portland, Maine
- 1807 - St. John's Church, Portsmouth, New Hampshire
- 1809-1810 - Moses Payson House, Bath, New Hampshire
- 1812 - Wickham House, Richmond, Virginia
- 1813 - Executive Mansion, Richmond, Virginia
- 1816 - Watertown Arsenal, Watertown, Massachusetts
- 1818 - 39 and 40 Beacon Street, Boston, Massachusetts
- 1819 - Cathedral Church of St. Paul, Boston, Massachusetts
- 1819 - David Sears House (now the Somerset Club), Boston, Massachusetts
- 1819 - Appleton-Parker House, or Nathan Appleton Residence, Boston, Massachusetts
- 1822 - St. Paul's Episcopal Church, Windsor, Vermont
- 1824 - Pilgrim Hall, Plymouth, Massachusetts
- 1824-1826 - Quincy Market, Boston, Massachusetts
- 1828 - United First Parish Church, Quincy, Massachusetts
- 1831 - Barnstable County Courthouse, Barnstable, Massachusetts
- 1834 - St. Joseph's Church, Boston, Massachusetts
- 1834 - Ropewalk, Boston Navy Yard, Charlestown, Massachusetts
- 1836 - Chelsea Naval Hospital, Chelsea, Massachusetts
- 1837 - Chelsea Naval Magazine, Chelsea, Massachusetts
- 1839 - Saddleback Ledge Lighthouse, between the islands of Vinalhaven and Isle au Haut, Maine
- 1847 - Mount Desert Rock Lighthouse, south of Mount Desert Island, Maine
- 1848 - Libby Island Lighthouse, Machiasport, Maine, at the entrance to Machias Bay
- 1848 - Matinicus Rock Lighthouse, 6 miles south of Matinicus Island, Maine
- 1848 - Whitehead Island Lighthouse, Whitehead Island, Maine—southern entrance to Penobscot Bay
- 1849 - Execution Rocks Lighthouse, Long Island Sound, New York
- 1850 - Monhegan Island Lighthouse, Monhegan Island, Maine
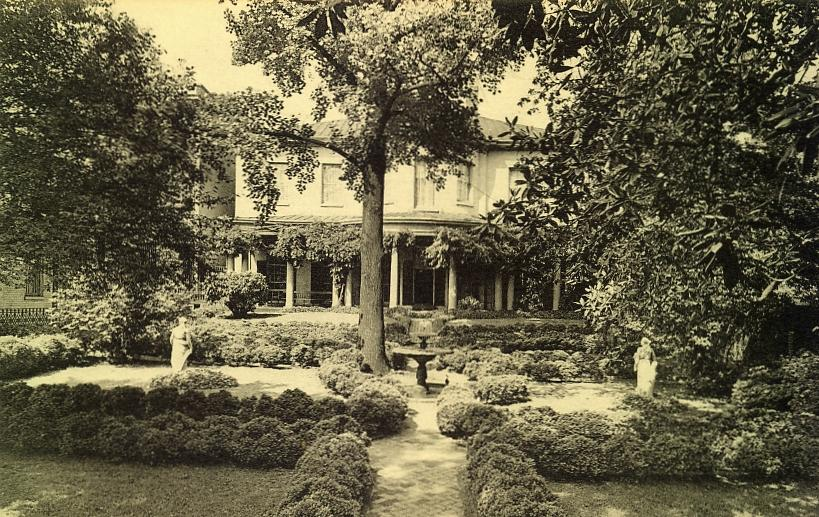
Wickham House, 1812, Richmond, Virginia

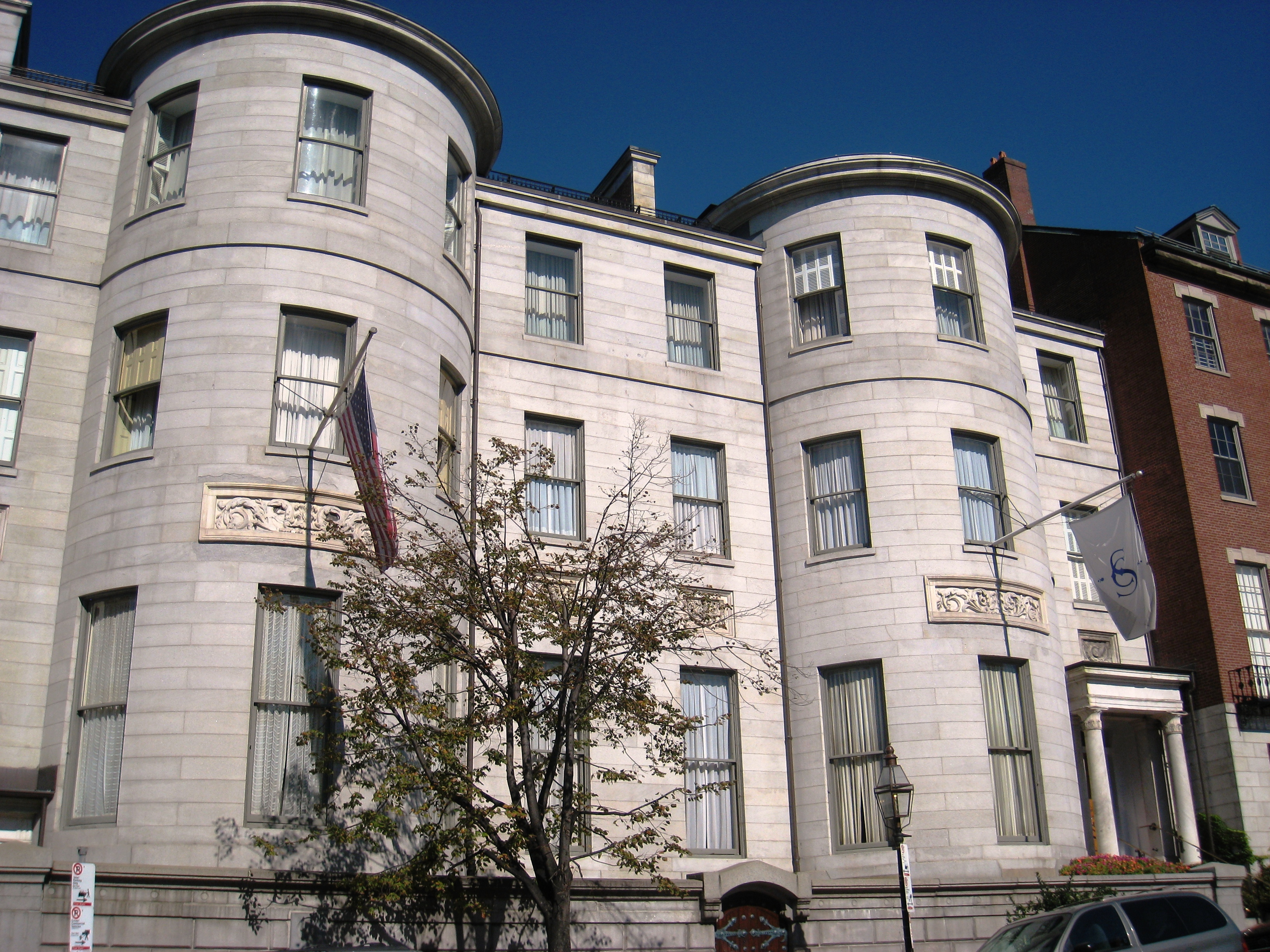
Somerset Club, 1819, Boston, Massachusetts

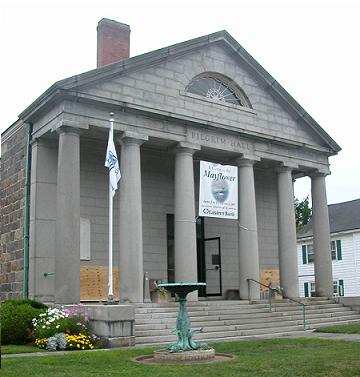
Pilgrim Hall, 1824, Plymouth, Massachusetts

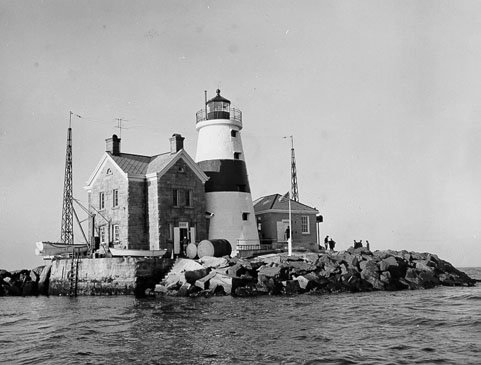
Execution Rocks Light, 1849, Long Island Sound

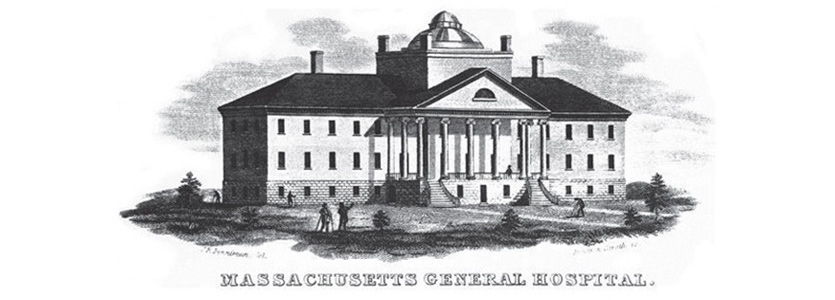
The Bulfinch Building: State of the Art from the Start.
