= Richard Sears (pilgrim) =

- Richard Sears
- Born: about 1595
- Died: September 26, 1676; Yarmouth, Plymouth Colony
- Other names: Richard Sares
- Citizenship: Yes

Richard Sears (about 1595 – 5 September 1676) was an early settler of New England who lived in both the Massachusetts Bay Colony and Plymouth Colony.

== Life ==
Coat of Arms of Richard Sears

Based on his reported age at death, Richard Sears was born about 1595. The earliest record of Richard Sears is the 1633 Plymouth tax list. (Note: Several mid-19th century publications give a claimed English pedigree for Richard Sears, and claimed he had a son Knyvett Sears. These assertions, contending a connection to the Bourchiers and Egmonds, were promulgated in a genealogy commissioned by David Sears of Boston, a wealthy descendant of Richard Sears, and were widely copied in genealogical writings of the time. These claims were examined by Samuel Pearce May and found to be baseless. May published his genealogy of the family (The Descendants of Richard Sares (Sears) of Yarmouth, Mass., 1638–1888) in 1890. It traces much of the genealogical forgery back to Horatio Gates Somerby.)

His parentage and origins are unknown.

In the book The Descendants of Richard Sares (Sears) of Yarmouth, Mass. 1638–1888 by Samuel Pearce May published in 1890, the author states, "There are no reliable traditions extant of Richard Sares and his family, and our only sources of information relative to them are the public records to which I have referred. In Plymouth Colony, the governor, deputy-governor, and magistrates and assistants, the ministers of the gospel and elders of the church, schoolmasters, commissioned officers in the militia, men of wealth, or men connected with the families of the nobility or gentry, were alone entitled to the prefix, Mr., pronounced Master, and their wives, Mrs., Mistress. This rule was rigidly enforced in early Colonial times, and in lists of names it was almost the invariable custom to commence with those who stood highest in rank, and follow that order to the end. Our forefathers claimed, and were cheerfully accorded the title due to their birth and position, and it is unwise to claim for them any title which they did not themselves assume. I do not find that Richard Sares was given the prefix of respect, and in the town records it is written that his wife, Goody Sares was buried Mar. 19, 1678–9. He was a farmer, hard-working and industrious, an affectionate husband and kind parent, a God-fearing man, and respected by his neighbors. His descendants showed good breeding, and many of them were prominent in church and town affairs, and in the militia. Their names may be found in the records of the Indian and French wars, the Revolutionary war, and that of 1812. Numbers served during the late Civil war, and shed their blood freely for their country. The family has always been very religious in its tendency, in latter years leaning to the Methodist and Baptist persuasions, and rather given to '-isms'; some of its members have been foremost in the temperance and anti-slavery movements, but it has never given rise to any prominent politicians, and while holding many local offices, not aspiring beyond the State Legislature. Of good stature, and comely appearance, they are healthy and long-lived, enterprising and esteemed citizens wherever found.

'Worth is better than Wealth, Goodness greater than Nobility, Excellence brighter than Distinction'

- Sears' Monument."

By 1637, by which time he had removed from Plymouth to Marblehead, he had married Dorothy Jones, daughter of George and Agnes Jones of Dinder, Somerset, England. She was the sister of Richard Jones of Dorchester and of Elizabeth (Jones) Thatcher of Yarmouth. Dorothy survived Richard, and was buried 19 March 1678–9 at Yarmouth.

Their children were Paul, Deborah, and Silas Sears.

Richard died at Yarmouth 5 September 1676 at the age of 81 years and 4 months.

== Legacy ==
Today, over 20,000 people can trace their lineage to Richard Sears. These people have influenced not only the British Colonies but the United States and the world. Today, many thousands of those descendants live in the United States alone.He is also a direct paternal ancestor of Richard Warren Sears the founder of Sears.
