= Vermilacinia howei =

Scientific classification
- Domain: Eukaryota
- Kingdom: Fungi
- Division: Ascomycota
- Class: Lecanoromycetes
- Order: Lecanorales
- Family: Ramalinaceae
- Genus: Vermilacinia
- Species: V. howei

Binomial name
- Vermilacinia howei Spjut (1996)

Species of lichen

Vermilacinia howei is a fruticose lichen that grows on trees and shrubs in the fog regions along the Pacific Coast of North America in the coastal scrub region of the Channel Islands of California, and around Bahía de San Quintín, Baja California and further south in the Vizcaíno Desert. The epithet honors Reginald Heber Howe, Jr. for his contributions to lichenology, especially acknowledged for providing images of the type (biology) specimens in his revision of the genus Ramalina.

== Distinguishing features ==
Vermilacinia howei is classified in the subgenus Cylindricaria in which it is distinguished from related species by the thallus divided into tubular slightly inflated branches. The species is also one of two in the genus—within North America—that lacks the diterpene, a diagnostic character trait that easily separates the species from most others in the genus. The triterpene zeorin, which is also common in the genus, is usually present in trace amounts, while other lichen substances are not evident from thin-layer chromatography (plates). Mature apothecia (fruiting bodies) are usually present, in contrast to rarely being fully developed in V. cerebra.

Vermilacinia howei is similar to V. leopardina in possessing black bands, or large irregularly shaped black spots, on the branches, and in addition to differing by the absence of (-)-16-hydroxykaurane, it further differs by the relatively smaller thallus, the branches not more than 3 cm long. The type (biology) has short cylindrical branches that appear to have been inflated such as might occur by taking in moisture from fog and then deflated upon drying out. Another distinction is its dark green cortex and relatively large tea-cup shaped apothecia in proportion to the size of the branches. However, other thalli of the species are recognized to have uniformly slender branches that occasionally differ in containing zeorin in higher concentrations, but they still lack the diterpene (-)-16-hydroxykaurane.

Vermilacinia howei occurs most frequently on the Vizcaíno Peninsula between Punta Eugenia and Bahía Tortugas, generally further inland from the ocean than V. nylanderi. These two species have a reverse morphology and chemistry relationship to that of V. leopardina and V. corrugata. This may have been the result of past geologic isolation of the Vizcaíno Peninsula from main peninsula.

== Taxonomic History ==
Vermilacinia howei was described in 1996, but also perceived to be a synonym (taxonomy) under an extremely broad species and genus concept; one that essentially combines all species of Vermilacinia that grow on trees and shrubs, including two sorediate species, under one species name, Niebla ceruchis, an epithet that is based on a type (biology) specimen for a species interpreted to grow on earth in South America, recognized as Vermilacinia ceruchis, one that is also endemic to South America. The listing of seven different species names under “Niebla ceruchis” that includes V. howei, for example as one synonym (biology) of the seven synonyms does not mean that they are equal to N. ceruchis, as sometimes indicated on web sites and in literature, especially when the listing of synonyms provide no scientific basis for reaching such a conclusion, and when the species already had been substantiated as distinct by their differences in morphology, chemistry, ecology, and geography.

The genus Vermilacinia is distinguished from Niebla by the absence of chondroid strands in the medulla, and by the major lichen substance predominantly of terpenes.
