= Execution Rocks Light =

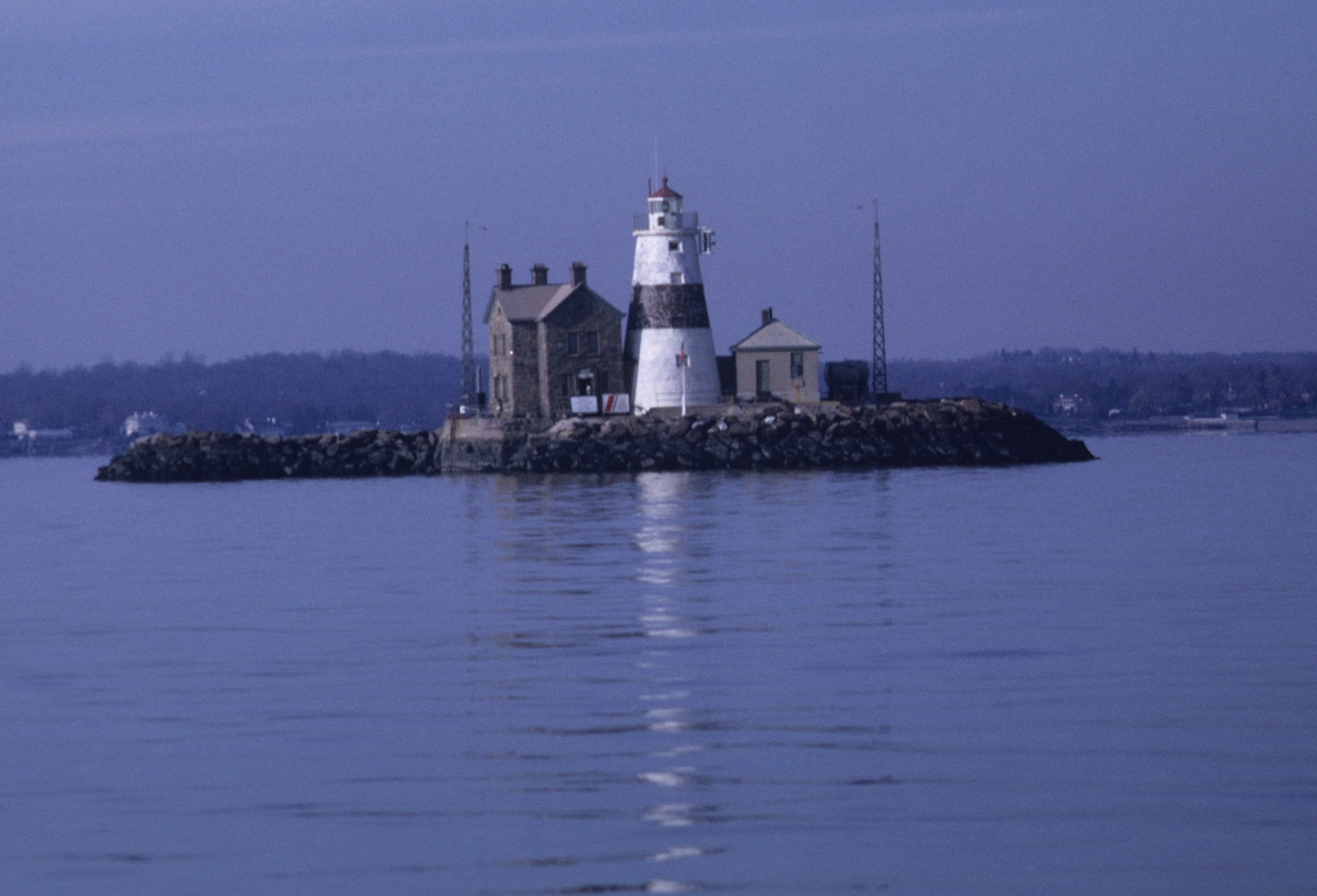
- Location: West end of Long Island Sound
- Coordinates: 40°52′41.3″N 73°44′16.3″W

Tower
- Constructed: 1849
- Foundation: Dressed stone/timber
- Construction: Granite with brick lining
- Automated: 1979
- Height: 60 feet (18 m)
- Shape: Conical
- Heritage: National Register of Historic Places listed place
- Fog signal: none
- Racon: "X" (– •• –)

Light
- First lit: 1850
- Focal height: 62 feet (19 m)
- Lens: Fourth Order Fresnel, 1856 (original), APRB-251 (current)
- Range: 15 nautical miles (28 km; 17 mi)
- Characteristic: Flashing white 10s
- Execution Rocks Light Station
- U.S. National Register of Historic Places
- Nearest city: New Rochelle, New York
- Architect: Alexander Parris
- MPS: Light Stations of the United States MPS
- NRHP reference No.: 07000094
- Added to NRHP: February 23, 2007

Execution Rocks Light is a lighthouse in the middle of Long Island Sound on the border between New Rochelle and Sands Point, New York. It stands 55 feet (17 m) tall, with a white light flashing every 10 seconds. The granite tower is painted white with a brown band around the middle. It has an attached stone keeper's house which has not been inhabited since the light was automated in 1979.

== History ==
This island on which this lighthouse sits is claimed to derive its name from colonial New York, when slaveowning settlers of Sands Point murdered enslaved people by chaining them to the rocks during low tide to let them drown; this tale is first recorded by Robert Caro in 1974. A 1964 account in The Journal of Long Island History claims that in fact, murderers were manacled with chains to staples driven into the rock at low tide.

A more likely etymology is that the British Admiralty named them Executioner's Rocks because so many ships ran aground on the treacherous rocks. References to "the Execution Rocks" in the Long Island Sound pre-date the American Revolution, existing as far back as 1766.

In March 1847, the United States Congress appropriated $25,000 for the creation of Execution Rocks Lighthouse. Designed by Alexander Parris, construction was completed in 1849. It began operation in 1850. Over the years, it has survived both a fire and a shipwreck.

The island is under the authority of the United States Coast Guard and is off limits to the public. It can be seen, however, during the Long Island Lighthouse Society's Spring Cold Coast Cruise, and from the Throgs Neck Bridge.

In January 1869, a daboll trumpet was added to Execution Rocks Light.

Before being executed for murder, serial killer Carl Panzram claimed in a posthumous autobiography that in the summer of 1920, he raped and killed a total of ten sailors and dumped their bodies at sea near Execution Rocks Light.

In November 1958, Execution Rocks Light was the location of a pivotal scene in the first-season episode "The Bird Guard" of the television series Naked City.

In May 2007, the Department of the Interior identified Execution Rocks Light Station as surplus under the National Historic Lighthouse Preservation Act of 2000.

Designed and built (1848–49) by Alexander Parris. Six story 72 ft. tower has frustum shape. Cut granite masonry keeper's dwelling (1867–68) in Gothic Revival style with 2.5 floors, approx. 1000 SF. Early example of "wave swept tower" engineering. On protective rip-rap artificial island (approx. 0.3 acre) with small boat basin.

Listed on the National Register of Historic Places and designated Historic Civil Engineering Landmark by American Society of Engineers. Property must be maintained according to the Secretary of Interior's Standards for Rehabilitation. Historic covenants will be incorporated into the Quitclaim Deed; however, no submerged land will be conveyed under the Quitclaim Deed.

The U.S. Coast Guard shall retain an easement for an Arc of Visibility and an unrestricted right of access in, to and across the Property to maintain, operate, service, repair and install equipment as necessary to support its aid to navigation mission. Additionally, the U.S. Coast Guard shall retain the unrestricted right to relocate or add any aids to navigation, or communications towers and equipment (along with necessary right of ingress/egress), or make any changes on any portion of the property as may be necessary for navigation/public safety purposes.

In 2007, it was added to the National Register of Historic Places as Execution Rocks Light Station. In January 2009, the Secretary of the Interior announced that Execution Rocks Light would be transferred to the Philadelphia-based Historically Significant Structures, which would collaborate with the Science Museum of Long Island to restore the light.

== Chronology ==
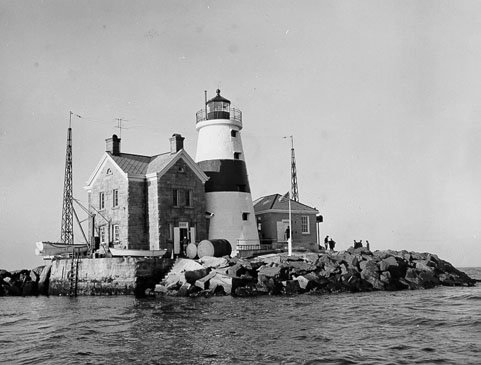

A chronological history of the lighthouse from the Coast Guard:

- 1847, March: Congress appropriated $25,000 for the light to be built.
- 1849, May: Construction was completed.
- 1850: The lighthouse was first lit.
- 1856: A fourth order Fresnel lens was installed.
- 1868: The keeper's quarters were added. The keeper no longer had to live in the cramped space inside the tower.
- December 8, 1918: A fire with an unknown origin caused $13,500 in damage. The engine house and machinery were destroyed, the tower and oil house were damaged and the windows, woodwork, gutters and eaves were also damaged.
- December 5, 1979: The lighthouse was automated. A VEGA lantern replaced the Fresnel lens.
- 2010: Historically Significant Structures Inc. is giving tower climb tours of the lighthouse in the summer.
