= Longwood Historic District (Massachusetts) =

Historic district in Massachusetts, United States

- U.S. National Register of Historic Places
- U.S. Historic district
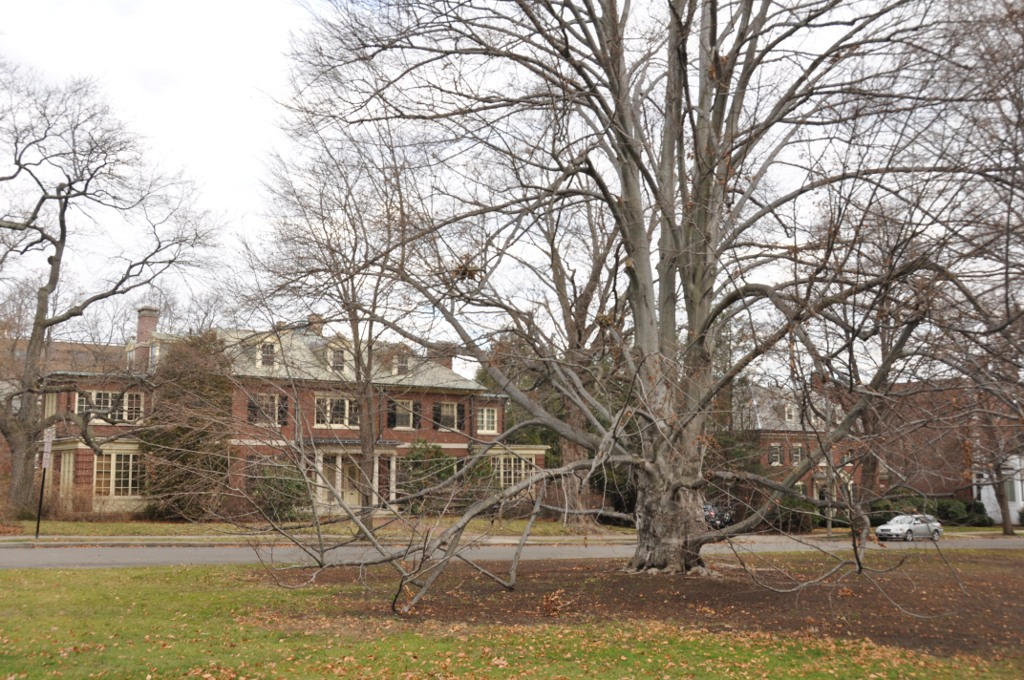

- Location within Massachusetts Location within the United States
- Location: Roughly bounded by Chapel, St. Marys, Monmouth, and Kent Sts., Brookline, Massachusetts
- Coordinates: 42°20′32″N 71°6′40″W
- Area: 52 acres (21 ha)
- Architectural style: Queen Anne, Gothic Revival, Romanesque
- NRHP reference No.: 78000460
- Added to NRHP: September 13, 1978

The Longwood Historic District is roughly bounded by Chapel, St. Marys, Monmouth, and Kent Sts. in Brookline, Massachusetts. The area was developed in the mid-19th century by David Sears and Amos Adams Lawrence as a fashionable residential area, and retains a number of architecturally distinguished buildings, including the Longwood Towers complex at 20 Chapel Street, Christ's Church Longwood, and Church of Our Saviour, Brookline. The district was listed on the National Register of Historic Places on September 13, 1978.

== Description and history ==
Originally the property of CPT John Hull and Judith Quincy Hull. Judge Sewall came into possession of this tract, which embraced more than 350 acres, through Hannah Quincy Hull (Sewall) who was the Hull's only daughter. John Hull in his youth lived in Muddy River Hamlet, in a little house which stood near the Sears Memorial Church. Hull removed to Boston, where he amassed a large fortune for those days. Judge Sewall probably never lived on his Brookline estate.

During the early colonial period, the Longwood area of eastern Brookline was part of the large farming estate of Samuel Sewall. Prior to 1850, it remained largely farmland, bisected only by Colchester Street. In the first half of the 19th century David Sears and Amos Lawrence, both prominent Boston businessmen, bought up large tracts of what had been Sewall's estate. The arrival of the Brookline Branch Railroad (now the MBTA Green Line D branch) served as an impetus to develop the area more fully. Some of the houses built by Lawrence and Sears became homes to friends and business associates, but neither lived in the area. (Lawrence had a home in the Cottage Farm area just to the north across Beacon Street.) Sears was responsible for the construction of Christ's Church, Longwood, while Lawrence funded the construction of the Episcopal Church of Our Saviour, Brookline, two of the non-residential buildings in the district.

The historic district is roughly triangular in shape, bounded on the east by St. Marys Street (on the town line with Boston) and on the west by Kent Street. It is bounded on the north by Beacon Street, but excludes buildings on the at street, and is bounded on the south by the MBTA right-of-way, which curves along the north bank of the Muddy River. The centerpiece of this area is Longwood Park, laid out by Sears, and its most prominent feature is the Longwood Towers, a group of Gothic Revival apartment towers built in the 1920s. Despite their large size, they do not detract from the older buildings that make up the bulk of the neighborhood. Most of the residences are Second Empire in style, with some Gothic elements, including one of the churches.

== See also ==
- National Register of Historic Places listings in Brookline, Massachusetts
