= Tom Babson =

American ice hockey coach and actor

Thomas William Babson (born July 15, 1945) is an American ice hockey coach and actor.

== Early life ==
Tom Babson graduated from Gloucester High School, where he was the captain of the ice hockey team in 1963. After graduating, he played one season at the Northwood School. He played college hockey at St. Lawrence University and the University of Massachusetts. Babson earned a bachelor's degree in theatre from the University of Massachusetts and a Master of Fine Arts degree from Smith College.

== Acting ==
Since the mid-1970s, Babson has been a "writer, teacher, actor and director of theatre, film and television". One of his first jobs in Hollywood was helping Paul Newman learn to play hockey for the film Slap Shot. Also, since the early 1980s, he has made appearances in more than 250 films and television series, such as portraying a recurring character Tom, an aspiring lawyer in the television sitcom Cheers. He also wrote a book The Actor’s Choice, published by Heinemann in 1996.

== Coaching ==
He served as a training coach for the United States women's national ice hockey team, especially during Olympics, from 1996 to 1998. He was a camp director for the United States National Women’s Hockey Festival from 1997 to 1999. He served the coach of the Boston College Eagles women's ice hockey from 1999 to 2003, where he compiled a record of 33–84–9. He was a coach "for several junior Olympic Development Program teams in Lake Placid."

== Personal life ==
He has a wife and a son. They reside in Gloucester, Massachusetts and the Beacon Hill section of Boston.
