= Union Club of Boston =

Private social club in Massachusetts, USA

Coordinates: 42°21′27.5″N 71°3′45.8″W

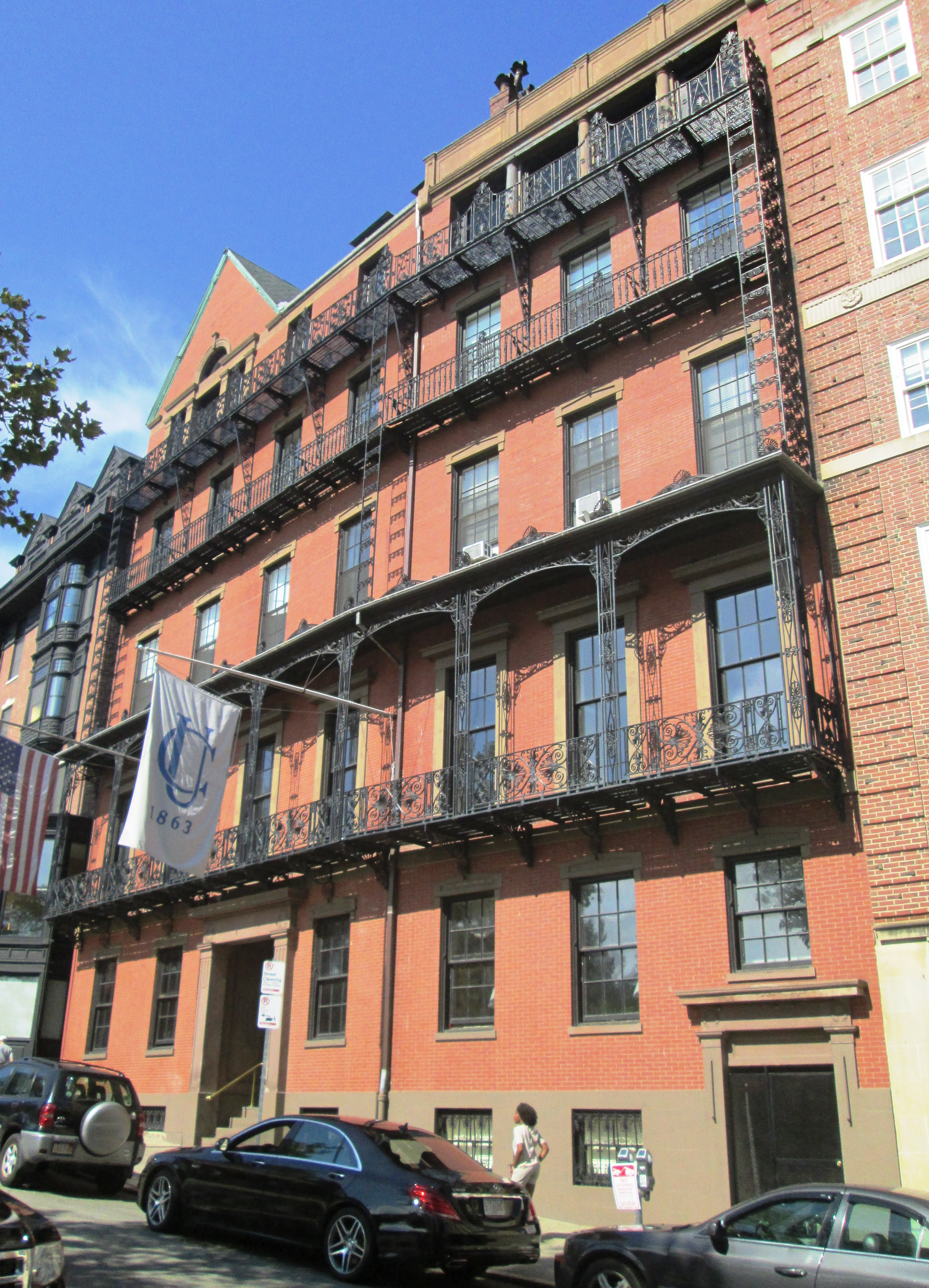
The clubhouse at 7-8 Park Street on Beacon Hill

The Union Club of Boston, founded in 1863, is one of the oldest gentlemen's clubs in the United States. It is located on Beacon Hill, adjacent to the Massachusetts State House. The clubhouse at No. 7 and No. 8 Park Street was originally the homes of John Amory Lowell (#7), and Abbott Lawrence (#8). The houses were built c.1830-40, and they were remodeled for club use in 1896. The clubhouse overlooks the Boston Common, and has views of the Common itself, Boston's Back Bay neighborhood, and the hills to the west of the city.

The club has EIN 04-1920190 under the classification 501(c)(7) Social and Recreation Clubs; in 2024, it claimed total revenue of $1,854,562 and total assets of $3,622,354.

The Union Club was formed by members of another prominent Boston gentlemen's club, the Somerset Club, after disagreement over whether to support the Union cause during the American Civil War, about which the members of the club split along political lines. In response, defectors formed the Union Club, which demanded "unqualified loyalty to the constitution and the Union of our United States, and unwavering support of the Federal Government in effort for the suppression of the rebellion." The founders of the club did not restrict membership to those of a single political party, but accepted all those willing to support the Union Cause in the Civil War.

The club later became the first male club in the city to welcome women as members. A few months later, in 1983, the club welcomed its first Black member.

== Notable Members ==
- President of the United States
  - Calvin Coolidge, Republican (1923-1929)
- Vice-president of the United States
  - Henry Wilson, Republican (1873-1875), under Ulysses S. Grant
- Speaker of the U.S. House of Representatives
  - Frederick Huntington Gillett, Republican (1919-1925)
- United States Senators
  - Charles Sumner, Free Soil, Liberal Republican, Republican (1851-1874)
  - Edward Everett, Whig (1853-1854)
  - Henry Wilson, Republican (1855-1873)
  - George Frisbie Hoar, Republican (1877-1904)
  - Henry Cabot Lodge, Republican (1893-1924)
  - Winthrop Murray Crane, Republican (1904-1913)
  - Frederick Huntington Gillett, Republican (1925-1931)
  - Sinclair Weeks, Republican (1944)
- United States Supreme Court Justices
  - Horace Gray (1881-1902)
  - Louis Dembitz Brandeis (1916-1939)
- Governors of Massachusetts
  - Edward Everett, Whig (1836-1846)
  - Emory Washburn, Whig (1854-1855)
  - John Albion Andrew, Republican (1861-1866)
  - Alexander Hamilton Bullock, Republican (1866-1869)
  - William Claflin, Republican (1869-1872)
  - William Gaston, Democrat (1875-1876)
  - Alexander Hamilton Rice, Republican (1876-1879)
  - John Davis Long, Republican (1880-1883)
  - Benjamin Franklin Butler, Democrat (1883-1884)
  - William Eustis Russell, Democrat (1891-1894)
  - Roger Wolcott, Republican (1896-1900)
  - Winthrop Murray Crane, Republican (1900-1903)
  - Curtis Guild Jr., Republican (1906-1909)
  - Eben Sumner Draper, Republican (1909-1911)
  - Samuel Walker McCall, Republican (1916-1919)
  - Calvin Coolidge, Republican (1919-1921)
  - Channing Harris Cox, Republican (1921-1925)
  - Frank G. Allen, Republican (1929-1931)
  - Joseph Buell Ely, Democrat (1931-1935)
- Presidents of Harvard University
  - Josiah Quincy (1829-1846)
  - Edward Everett (1846-1849)
  - Jared Sparks (1849-1853)
- Presidents of the Massachusetts Institute of Technology
  - Willian Barton Rogers (1862-1870)
  - Francis Amasa Walker (1881-1897)
  - Karl Taylor Compton (1930-1948)
  - James Rhyne Killian Jr. (1948-1959)
- Men of letters, authors, poets, scholars, politicians, etc.
  - Charles Francis Adams Jr. – author and historian
  - John K. Burgess, state representative
  - Henry Ingersoll Bowditch – abolitionist
  - Richard Henry Dana Jr. – author
  - Charles Devens Jr. – general
  - Ralph Waldo Emerson – philosopher
  - John Murray Forbes – merchant, philanthropist and abolitionist
  - Asa Gray – botanist
  - Edward Everett Hale – theologian
  - Henry Lee Higginson – founder of the Boston Symphony Orchestra
  - Thomas Wentworth Higginson – soldier and writer
  - Oliver Wendell Holmes Sr. – poet, novelist and physician
  - James Russel Lowell – poet
  - Charles Eliot Norton – editor and man of letters
  - Robert Keating O'Neill - librarian, historian, and author
  - Francis Parkman – historian
  - Josiah Quincy IV – Mayor of Boston
  - Charles Storer Storrow, civil engineer and industrialist
  - William Fiske Whitney – anatomist, curator and pathologist

== See also ==
- List of American gentlemen's clubs
