= Church of Our Saviour, Brookline =

Coordinates: 42.343685°N 71.10927°W

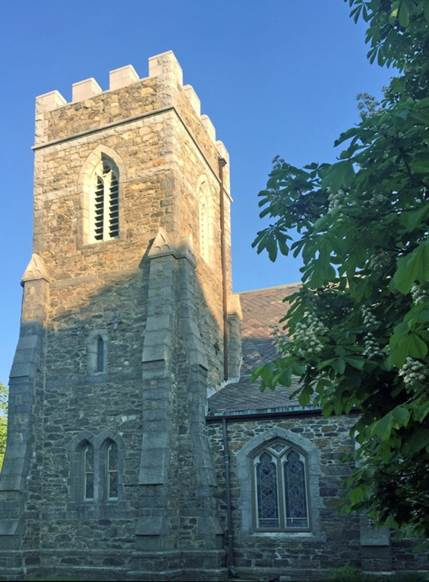
Church of Our Saviour, Brookline, Massachusetts

Episcopal Church of Our Saviour is a parish of the Episcopal Diocese of Massachusetts in the Longwood neighborhood of Brookline, Massachusetts, which is now located in the Longwood Historic District (Massachusetts). The church is located at the corner of Carlton and Monmouth Streets, one block from Beacon Street and two blocks from Park Drive. The street address is 25 Monmouth St., Brookline MA.

== History ==
The parish of the Church of Our Saviour was organized by twelve families who lived in the Longwood and Cottage Farm neighborhoods of Brookline, Massachusetts and was accepted as a parish of the Episcopal Diocese of Massachusetts on April 17, 1867. The first worship service was held on March 22, 1868, and the church was consecrated on September 29, 1868. The first rector was the Rev. Elliott Dunham Tompkins, who served from 1868 to 1873. The Rev. Henry Knox Sherrill served as the fourth rector from 1919 to 1923 and later served as Bishop of the Diocese of Massachusetts (1930–1947) and Presiding Bishop of the national Episcopal Church (United States) (1947–1958).

The church was built by brothers Amos Adams Lawrence and William R. Lawrence, in honor of their father, textile industrialist and philanthropist Amos Lawrence. It was designed by architect Alexander Rice Esty. A transept chapel designed by the firm Sturgis and Cabot was dedicated in 1893 to the memory of Sarah Appleton Lawrence (wife of Amos A. Lawrence). A parish hall designed by the firm of Cabot and Chandler was completed in 1880 and enlarged in 1922. A rectory, designed by architect Arthur Rotch of the firm Rotch and Tilden, was the gift of Sarah Appleton Lawrence and was dedicated in 1886.

The parish has a long and distinguished history of church music. Composer Gardner Evans served as organist and choir director from 1923 until his death in 1951. A rebuilt 1887 Hook and Hastings organ (Opus 1366) was installed in 2012.

The parish was the home parish of Ida Whittemore Soule (1849–1944), who has been recognized as the "mother of the United Thank Offering"

== Present day ==
The ninth and present rector is the Rev. Joel M. Ives, a native of Rockport, Massachusetts and a graduate of the General Theological Seminary in New York. The music program follows the English cathedral tradition with a choir of twenty members, under the direction of music director Katie Yosua. The Sunday School follows a Montessori-based Godly Play curriculum for elementary school level classes and uses experiential activities and thought-provoking class discussions for the middle school class. Middle school and high school students also participate in the Charles River Deanery Youth Collaborative, which offers teens town-wide and regional social and community service mission-based events. Sunday services take place in the fall, winter, and spring at 10:30AM with a coffee hour following the service. In the summer, services switch to 10:00AM and are held outdoors in the Cloister of the Church.
