= David Sears (businessman) =

David Sears Jr.
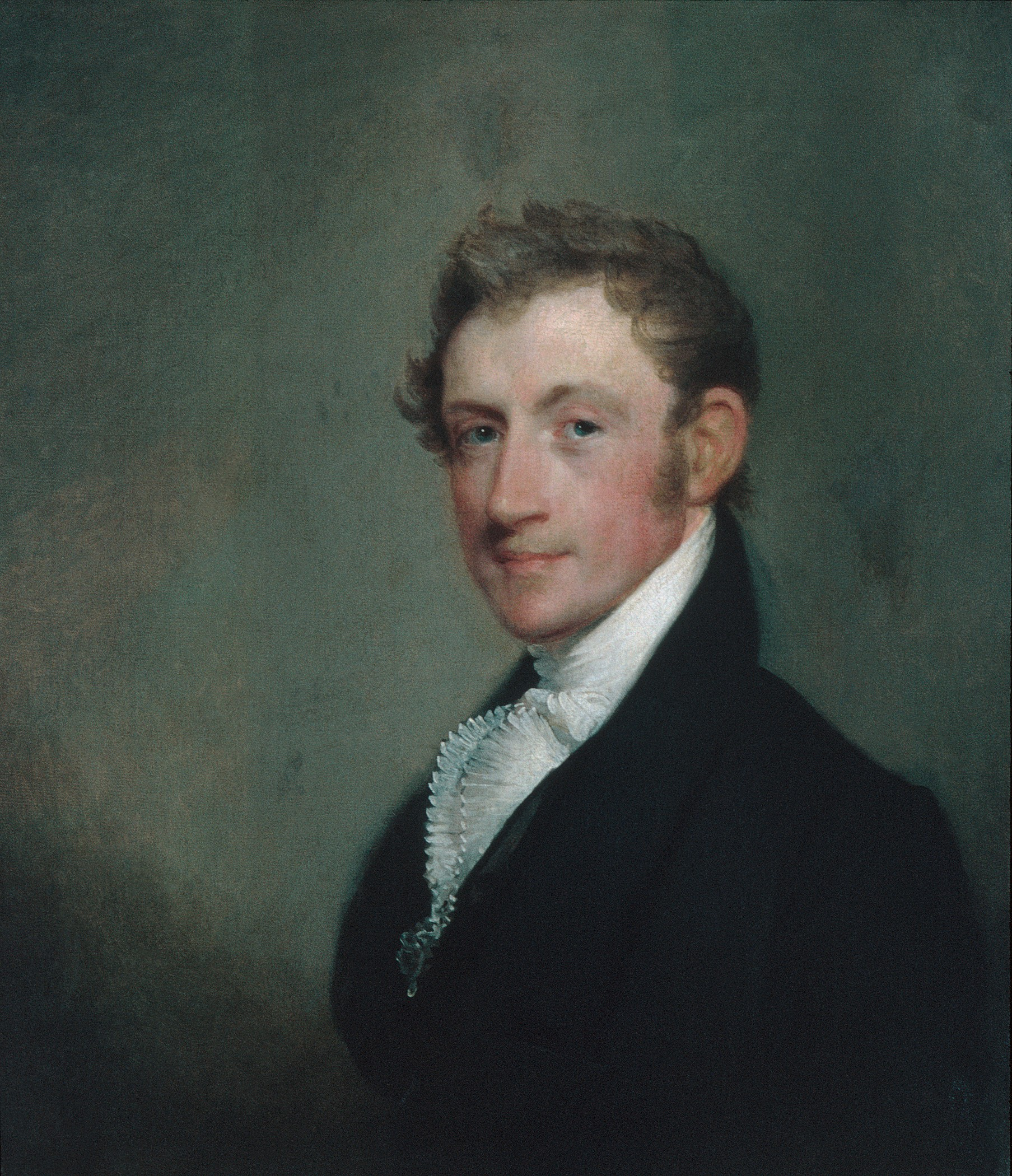
- Portrait of Sears, by Gilbert Stuart, c. 1815
- Born: October 8, 1787; Boston, Massachusetts
- Died: January 14, 1871 (aged 83)
- Education: Harvard College
- Spouse: Miriam Clarke Mason (m. 1809; died 1870)
- Children: Harriet Sears; Frederick Richard Sears; Grace Winthrop Rives; David Sears III; Anna Amory; Knyvet Winthrop Sears; Ellen Sears
- Parent(s): David Sears Sr. Ann Winthrop

David Sears Jr. (October 8, 1787 – January 14, 1871) was a prominent 19th-century Boston philanthropist, merchant, real estate developer, and landowner.

== Early life ==
David Sears Jr. was born on October 8, 1787, in Boston, Massachusetts to David Sears Sr. and Ann Winthrop, a descendant of the first governor of Massachusetts, John Winthrop. Through his father, he was a descendant of Richard Sears, who settled in the Plymouth Colony in 1630.

He graduated from Harvard College in 1807, where he was a member of the Porcellian Club.

== Career ==
Coat of Arms of David Sears

Upon the death of his father David Sr. in 1816, he inherited a large fortune, the result of a career in the China trade.

About 1820, Sears purchased some 200 acres (0.81 km^{2}) in Brookline, Massachusetts, which he developed into the village of Longwood, now a historic district. He also built Christ's Church Longwood there, in the crypt of which he and many of his family members are buried. He established it as an ecumenical house of worship to promote Christian unity, in accordance with his personal beliefs, which have been termed "outspoken and peculiar". He also purchased a large tract to the north of Longwood, where he built a house for his son Frederick in 1844. Sears sold the area in 1850 and the purchasers developed Cottage Farm, another historic district.

For about fifteen years beginning in 1849, he promoted a plan for the development of Boston's Back Bay neighborhood that would increase the value of his real estate investments at the expense of the state government. As it evolved before its final rejection, his proposal included a large lake or a long narrow channel as well as seven block-sized parks.

Sears purchased some 200 acres (0.81 km^{2}), which he developed into the village of Longwood.

== Personal life ==
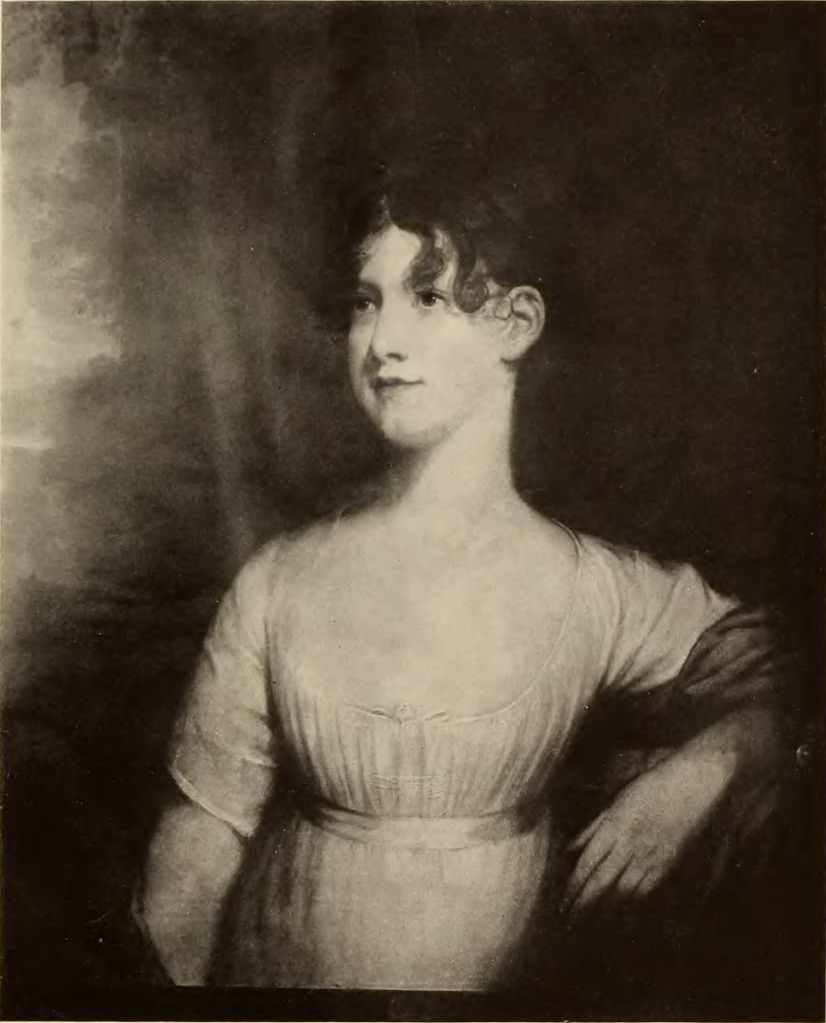
Miriam Clarke Mason Sears, painted by Gilbert Stuart

In 1809, he married Miriam Clarke Mason (1789–1870), daughter of U.S. Representative and Senator Jonathan Mason. They had nine children, one of whom was called David Sears III

Gilbert Stuart painted his portrait twice and one of those, painted about 1815 and entirely in Stuart's hand, is in the collections of the Metropolitan Museum of Art.

David Sears died at his Beacon Street home on January 14, 1871.

=== Philanthropy and legacy ===
He helped fund the construction and decoration of St. Paul's Cathedral on Boston Common in 1819.

He donated a large telescope that served as the central feature of the Harvard Astronomical Observatory at its founding in 1843.

In 1844 his gift of $10,000 rescued Amherst College during a difficult time and marks the beginning of the Sears Foundation of Literature and Benevolence.

Sears spent summers at a vacation home in Maine where local residents, in the hope of attracting his patronage, named a new municipality Searsport in his honor. He donated $1000 for the construction of a town hall, denounced the design of the one they built, and made no further donations.

In 1819, he had a house designed by Alexander Parris and built on Beacon Hill at 42–43 Beacon Street that is believed to be the first granite structure in Boston and the finest residence of his day. He doubled its size in 1831. Sears was enamored of Napoleon Bonaparte, naming several of his properties "Longwood" for the French emperor's last home on St. Helena, and his Beacon Street home paid tribute in adopting the empire style for its decor with a liberal use of golden eagles and the initial "N". (Note: An example of Sears' furniture is displayed at the Art Institute of Chicago.) It was purchased by the Somerset Club in 1871.

Sears Island and Searsport, Maine, are named for him.

=== Descendants ===
His great-great-grandson was John W. Sears, a Republican politician active in the 1960s and 1970s. He was not related to Richard Warren Sears, who along with Alvah Curtis Roebuck founded the well-known department store chain and catalog Sears, Roebuck, & Co.

== See also ==
- Sears Tower – Harvard Observatory
- Searsport, Maine
- Somerset Club
