= Cottage Farm Historic District =

Historic district in Massachusetts, United States

- U.S. National Register of Historic Places
- U.S. Historic district
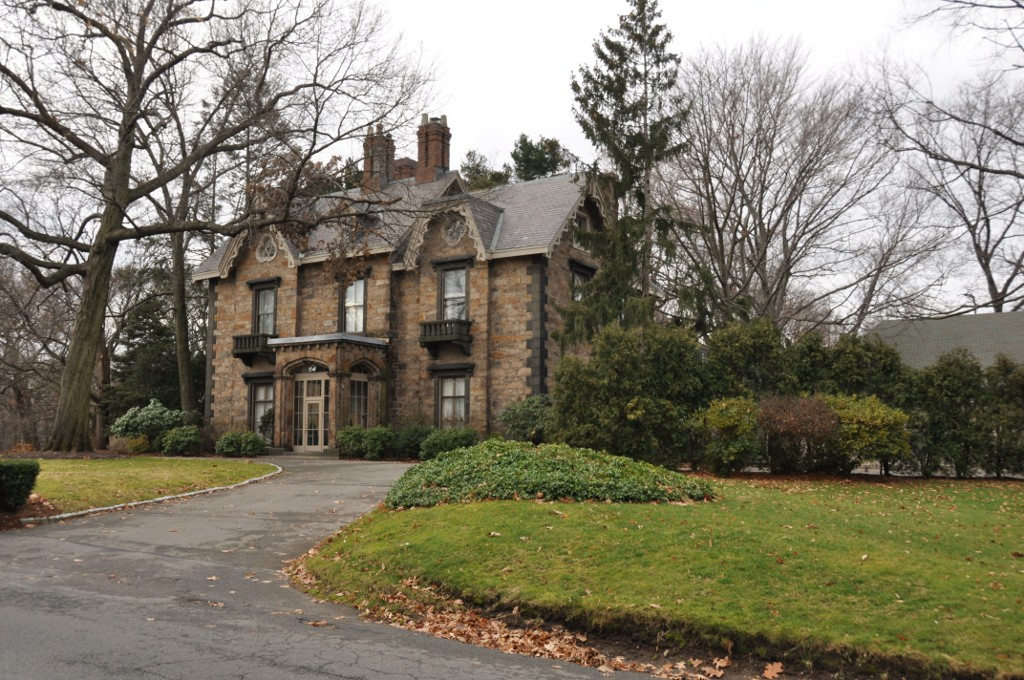
- A house on Cottage Farm Road

- Location within Massachusetts Location within the United States
- Location: Roughly bounded by Amory, Dummer, Lenox, Brookline and Beacon Sts., Brookline, Massachusetts
- Coordinates: 42°20′51″N 71°6′44″W
- Built: 1850
- Architect: Multiple
- Architectural style: Queen Anne, International style, Gothic Revival
- NRHP reference No.: 78000455
- Added to NRHP: March 29, 1978

The Cottage Farm Historic District is a residential area in the northeastern corner of Brookline, Massachusetts, United States, known for its association with industrialist Amos Adams Lawrence (1814–1886). Laid out in the 1850s and centered around the junction of Essex and Ivy Streets, it features high-quality housing on large lots, built between the 1850s and 1910s. The district was listed on the National Register of Historic Places in 1978.

== Description and history ==
The area that is now Cottage Farm was, in the 17th century, part of a large meadowland owned by jurist Samuel Sewall, bounded on the north by the Charles River and the south by the Muddy River, west of the latter's mouth. In the early 19th century, this property was acquired by David Sears, who built a house in the Cottage Farm area in 1844 for his son Frederick. Amos Lawrence acquired the Cottage Farm tract from Sears in 1850, built a house for his family in 1851, and began subdividing and building out the property. Three of the early houses, including that of Lawrence, are notable English Gothic Revival stone buildings, including one designed by architect George Minot Dexter as his own home. Later houses were built in popular architectural styles.

The historic district is bounded on the north by Dummer and Mountfort Streets, on the west by Amory Street, on the south by Beacon Street, and on the east by St. Mary's Street. The district excludes properties on the latter two roads. The southwestern portion of this area is mainly openspace, with a playground and conservation area surrounding Hall's Pond. There are 75 historically significant buildings on 67 acres (27 ha). Most of them are residential, with a shared setting and scale. Some are institutional buildings, including those of the New England Hebrew Academy, but even these are not out of scale with the residences.

Much of the district was saved from demolition by governor Francis Sargent's 1970 moratorium on all highway construction inside Route 128, as it sat directly in the path of one of the highways cancelled by the moratorium, the Inner Belt Expressway.

== See also ==
- National Register of Historic Places listings in Brookline, Massachusetts
