= Dexter Southfield School =

Dexter Southfield

Location
- 20 Newton Street; Brookline, Massachusetts 02445; United States

Information
- Type: Private, Independent
- Motto: Our Best Today, Better Tomorrow
- Religious affiliation: None
- Founded: 1926; 100 years ago
- Head of school: Dr. Peter Folan
- Grades: Pre-K-12
- Enrollment: 1,100
- Student to teacher ratio: 7:1
- Campus size: 36 acres
- Colors: Maroon and navy
- Accreditation: NEASC
- Annual tuition: $68,000 (grades 6-12)
- Website: www.dextersouthfield.org

The Dexter Southfield School is an independent co-educational day school located in Brookline, Massachusetts, educating students from pre-kindergarten through twelfth grade. Dexter Southfield was founded in 1926 as the Dexter School. In 2013 the Dexter School merged with the sister school Southfield School to form Dexter Southfield with which it had shared its campus since 1992.

== History ==
The Dexter School was founded in 1926 in response to the closure of the Noble & Greenough Lower School and lack of educational opportunities for boys in the Brookline area. The Dexter School opened on Freeman Street in the affluent Cottage Farm neighborhood educating boys through ninth grade. Dexter was attended by Joseph P. Kennedy Jr. and the 35th president of the United States, John F. Kennedy, along with other notable figures. The school developed a strong bond with many of Boston's leading families with ties to the leading preparatory and Ivy League schools. In 1966, Dexter sold its campus on Freeman Street and moved to its present location on Mount Walley on Newton Street on the South Brookline/Jamaica Plain line. The school bought the property from the Catholic Foreign Mission Society of America who had resided on the site since 1945. The property was the former estate of Anna Sears, who had built a Mediterranean Revival Style villa on the site in 1924. As Dexter expanded, the school continued the style of the white stucco façade and red terra-cotta roof of the Sears House. Today, the original house remains the central structure on campus and houses the Senior Lounge, Business Office and Admissions Office. In preparation for the school's move in 1966, the A building, Fiske Hall, and pool and gymnasium were built to the west of the Sears House. The Thorndike Hockey rink was added to the campus in 1973. From its long tradition as a boy's lower school, Dexter has undergone a vast transformation over the last 25 years. In the 1990s, further additions were made to the campus including the construction of the Mid-Rise and original lower school building. In 1992, the Southfield School was established on the same campus to expand Dexter's educational philosophy to young girls. In 2002, the Upper School was established to enable both the Dexter and Southfield schools to continue the school's mission into the competitive secondary school market. The Clay Center was also constructed to the east of the Sears House greatly altering the school campus. The new center included a new lecture hall, dining hall and fifth floor observatory. In 2011 Mr. and Mrs. William Phinney, who had led the school since 1964, and oversaw its move and expansion, retired after 47 years at the school. In 2013, the school was rededicated as the Dexter Southfield School, after receiving formal accreditation from the New England Association of Schools and Colleges (NEASC) Today, Dexter Southfield students offers single-sex classrooms in Pre-K through 8 and co-education in grades 9 through 12.

== Campus ==
The 36-acre (15 ha) campus on the Boston-Brookline border includes buildings such as Fiske Hall and the Sears House grace the campus. Of particular note is the Clay Center for Science and Technology which provided students with classroom opportunities as well as an astronomical observatory.

== Academics ==
Dexter Southfield School's curriculum includes arts as painting, wood shop, choir, and much more. Beginning in Kindergarten, each homeroom does one public speaking event per year. When in seventh grade, each student takes Latin or a modern language. Every student in the seventh and eighth grades is required to take a language and all students take six classes in grade 8. In the high school, there are approximately fifteen AP courses offering anything from AP Physics to AP European History to AP Latin. There are also honors and accelerated level classes for most courses. There are many upper class electives in history, english, and science.

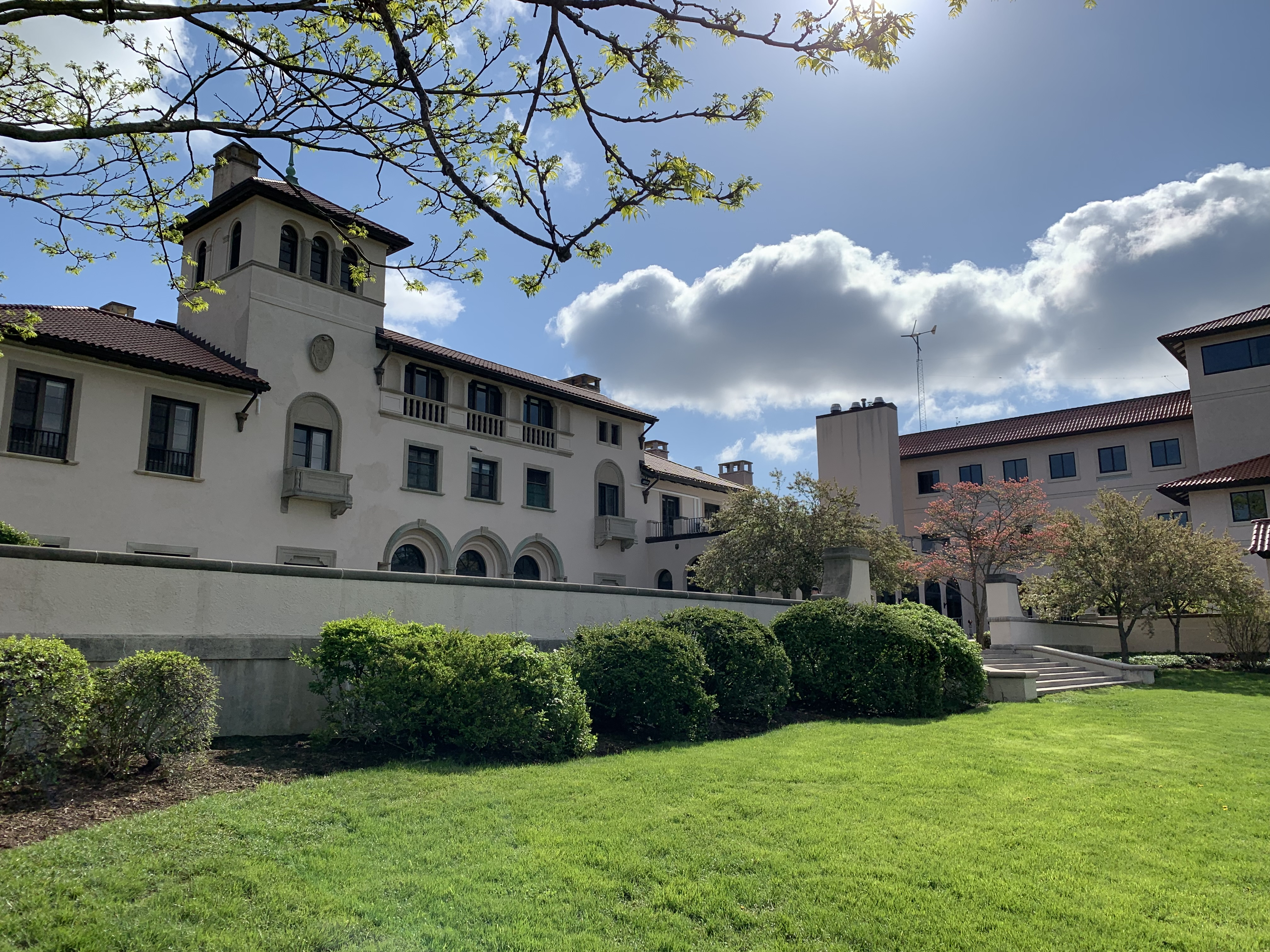
Dexter Southfield's Sears House

== Athletics ==
The Varsity Hockey team is competes against teams including Avon Old Farms, Cushing, Nobles, Belmont Hill, Kimball Union, and Salisbury. Dexter's Varsity Tennis in 2012 was in NEPSAC Class A and beat teams like Phillips Andover and Phillips Exeter and advanced to the semifinals of the Class A tournament. The Varsity Hockey, Lacrosse, Tennis, Football, and Baseball teams have had a number of athletes continue their careers at the Division 1 level of NCAA sports.

== Notable alumni ==
- John F. Kennedy, 35th President of the United States (1961–1963)
- Joseph P. Kennedy Jr. Brother of John F. Kennedy, Naval aviator during World War II; killed in action
- John W. Sears, American lawyer, historian and politician
- F. Warren McFarlan, Professor of Business Administration, Emeritus, at Harvard Business School
- Dmitri Nabokov, son of Vladimir Nabokov, opera singer and author
- Story Musgrave, Astronaut
- Ben Bradlee, Editor of The Washington Post
- McGeorge Bundy, United States National Security Advisor
- William Bundy, American attorney and intelligence expert
- Gaston Caperton, Governor of West Virginia, President of the College Board
- Ernie Adams, Director of Football Operations for the New England Patriots
- David Walton, actor
- Ryan Donato, ice hockey player for the Chicago Blackhawks
- Conor Garland, ice hockey player for the Vancouver Canucks
- Matthew Boldy, ice hockey player for the Minnesota Wild
- Jack Rathbone, ice hockey player in the Buffalo Sabres organization
- Joshua Báez, baseball player for the St. Louis Cardinals
- Stephen Belichick, defensive coordinator, North Carolina Tar Heels football
