= Abby Newhook =

Canadian ice hockey player (born 2003)

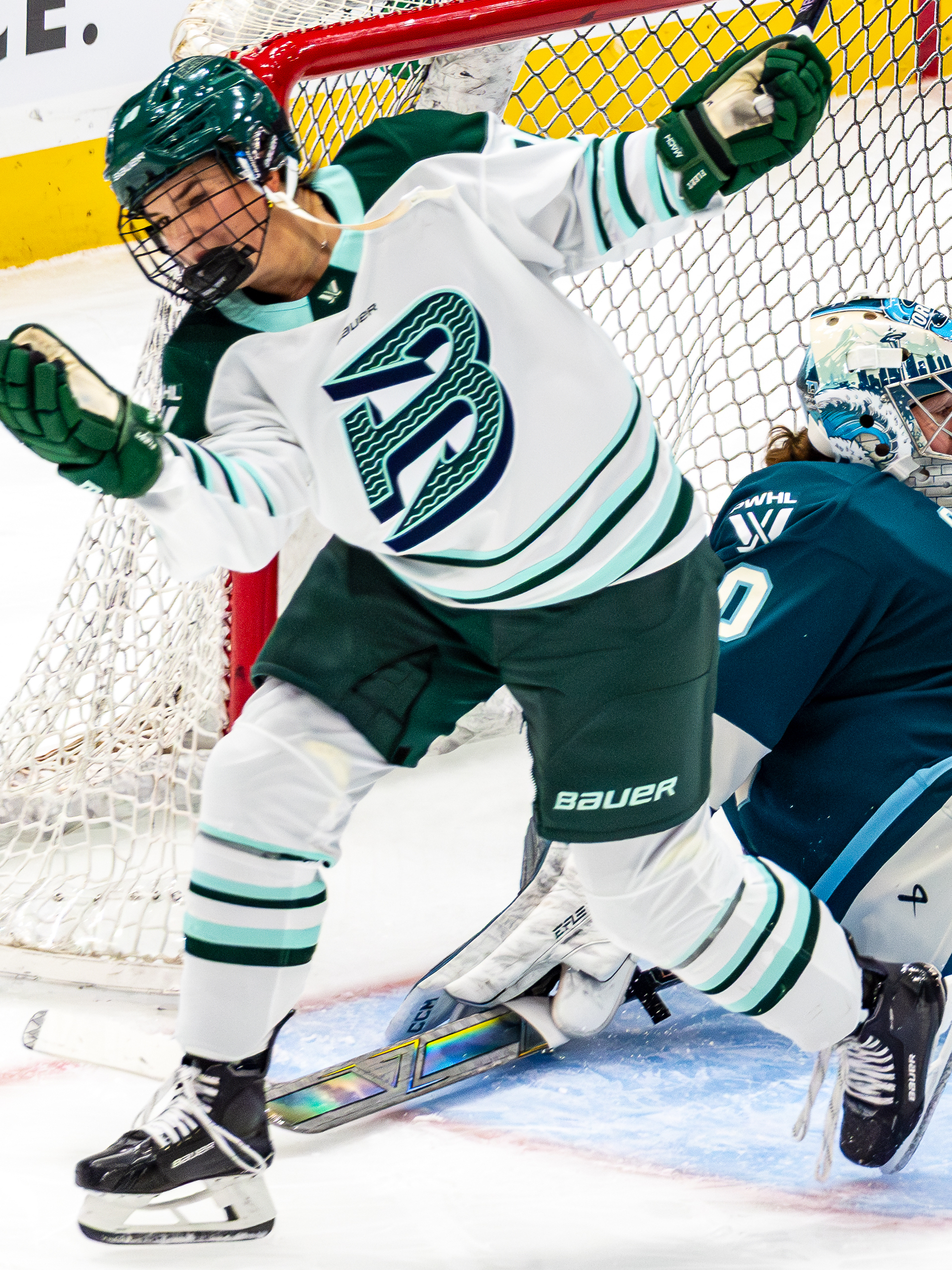
- Newhook with the Boston Fleet in 2026
- Born: May 13, 2003 (age 23) St. John's, Newfoundland and Labrador, Canada
- Height: 171 cm (5 ft 7 in)
- Position: Forward
- Shoots: Right
- PWHL team: Boston Fleet
- Playing career: 2021–present

Abigail Newhook (born May 13, 2003) is a Canadian professional ice hockey forward for the Boston Fleet of the Professional Women's Hockey League (PWHL). She played college ice hockey at Boston College.

== Career ==
Newhook began playing hockey at the age of three. Until 2018, she played for the boys' St. John's Hitmen bantam AAA, serving as team captain in the 2017–18 season. She then moved to the United States to play for the Bay State Breakers and Tabor Academy. She committed to join Boston College in the United States for college hockey when she was 14, the youngest girl from Newfoundland & Labrador to commit to an NCAA Division I team. She began studying at the university in the 2021–22 season.

In her first NCAA season, Newhook finished ninth in Hockey East scoring, and led the league in goals (16), assists (13) and points (29) by a rookie player. She was consequently named the Hockey East Rookie of the Year, as well as to the All-Rookie Squad. In her second year with the Eagles, Newhook recorded 19 goals and 14 assists in 36 games. She was named to the league's Third All-Star Team. In advance of her third NCAA season, she was named team co-captain, a rarity for a junior player that she professed to be "surprised" about, adding "I think that my teammates have a lot of confidence in me and that means a lot to me."

On June 24, 2025, she was drafted in the fifth round, 34th overall, by the Boston Fleet in the 2025 PWHL Draft. On November 20, 2025, she signed a one-year contract with the Fleet.

== International play ==
Newhook appeared at three selection camps for the Canadian U18 team, but did not make the final roster on those occasions. In 2022 she was invited to Hockey Canada's U23 development camp for the first time. She returned the following year as well, and this time participated in a three-game tournament against the United States in Lake Placid.

== Personal life ==
Newhook's older brother Alex also played for Boston College and was selected by the Colorado Avalanche in the first round, 16th overall, of the 2019 NHL entry draft.

== Career statistics ==
=== Regular season and playoffs ===
			Regular season					Playoffs
Season	Team	League	GP	G	A	Pts	PIM	GP	G	A	Pts	PIM
2021–22	Boston College	HE	34	17	15	32	12	—	—	—	—	—
2022–23	Boston College	HE	36	19	14	33	4	—	—	—	—	—
2023–24	Boston College	HE	36	10	12	22	18	—	—	—	—	—
2024–25	Boston College	HE	36	9	17	26	24	—	—	—	—	—
2025–26	Boston Fleet	PWHL	29	7	7	14	6	4	0	1	1	0
PWHL totals			29	7	7	14	6	4	0	1	1	0

== Awards and honours ==
Honors	Year	Ref
PWHL
All-Rookie Team	2026	
