= 2015–16 NCAA Division I women's ice hockey rankings =

- NCAA tournament: 2016
- NCAA champion: Minnesota
- Preseason No. 1 (USA Today): Minnesota
- Preseason No. 1 (USCHO): Minnesota
- NCAA Division I women's ice hockey rankings

2015–16 NCAA Division I women's ice hockey rankings

Two polls make up the 2015–16 NCAA Division I women's ice hockey rankings, the USCHO.com/CBS College Sports poll and the USA Today/USA Hockey Magazine poll. As the 2015–16 season progresses, rankings are updated weekly.

Legend
| | Increase in ranking |
| | Decrease in ranking |
| | Not ranked previous week |
| Italics | Number of first place votes |
| (#-#) | Win–loss–tie record |
| т | Tied with team above or below also with this symbol |

== USCHO ==
| | Preseason Sep 21 | Week 1 Oct 5 | Week 2 Oct 12 | Week 3 Oct 19 | Week 4 Oct 26 | Week 5 Nov 2 | Week 6 Nov 9 | Week 7 Nov 16 | Week 8 Nov 23 | Week 9 Nov 30 | Week 10 Dec 7 | Week 11 Dec 14 | Week 12 Jan 4 | Week 13 Jan 11 | Week 14 Jan 18 | Week 15 Jan 25 | Week 16 Feb 1 | Week 17 Feb 8 | Week 18 Feb 15 | Week 19 Feb 22 | Week 20 Feb 29 | Week 21 Mar 7 | Week 22 (Final) Mar 21 | |
|---|---|---|---|---|---|---|---|---|---|---|---|---|---|---|---|---|---|---|---|---|---|---|---|---|
| 1. | Minnesota (15) | Minnesota (2–0–0) (15) | Minnesota (4–0–0) (15) | Minnesota (6–0–0) (15) | Minnesota (8–0–0) (15) | Wisconsin (10–0–0) (8) | Wisconsin (10–0–0) (8) | Wisconsin (12–0–0) (10) | Wisconsin (14–0–0) (12) | Wisconsin (16–0–0) (11) | Wisconsin (18–0–0) (14) | Boston College (20–0–0) (14) | Boston College (20–0–0) (15) | Boston College (21–0–0) (15) | Boston College (23–0–0) (15) | Boston College (26–0–0) (15) | Boston College (27–0–0) (15) | Boston College (29–0–0) (15) | Boston College (32–0–0) (15) | Boston College (34–0–0) (15) | Boston College (36–0–0) (15) | Boston College (38–0–0) (15) | Minnesota (35–4–1) (15) | 1. |
| 2. | Boston College | Boston College (2–0–0) | Boston College (3–0–0) T-2 | Boston College (6–0–0) | Boston College (8–0–0) | Boston College (10–0–0) (7) | Boston College (11–0–0) (7) | Boston College (14–0–0) (5) | Boston College (15–0–0) (3) | Boston College (17–0–0) (4) | Boston College (19–0–0) (1) | Wisconsin (18–1–1) (1) | Wisconsin (18–1–1) | Wisconsin (20–1–1) | Wisconsin (22–1–1) | Wisconsin (24–1–1) | Wisconsin (26–1–1) | Wisconsin (28–1–1) | Wisconsin (30–1–1) | Minnesota (29–3–1) | Minnesota (31–3–1) | Wisconsin (34–3–1) | Boston College (40–1–0) | 2. |
| 3. | Wisconsin | Wisconsin (2–0–0) | Wisconsin (4–0–0) T-2 | Wisconsin (6–0–0) | Wisconsin (8–0–0) | Minnesota (9–1–0) | Minnesota (9–1–0) | Minnesota (11–1–0) | Minnesota (13–1–0) | Minnesota (15–1–0) | Minnesota (15–3–0) | Minnesota (15–3–0) | Minnesota (15–3–0) | Minnesota (18–3–0) | Minnesota (20–3–0) | Minnesota (22–3–0) | Minnesota (24–3–0) | Minnesota (25–3–1) | Minnesota (27–3–1) | Wisconsin (30–3–1) | Wisconsin (32–3–1) | Minnesota (32–4–1) | Wisconsin (35–4–1) | 3. |
| 4. | Harvard | Harvard (0–0–0) | Clarkson (5–0–0) | Clarkson (7–0–0) | Clarkson (9–0–0) | Clarkson (9–0–2) | Clarkson (10–1–2) | Clarkson (13–1–2) | Northeastern (11–2–1) | Quinnipiac (11–1–3) | Quinnipiac (13–1–3) | Quinnipiac (14–1–3) | Quinnipiac (16–1–3) | Quinnipiac (17–1–4) | Quinnipiac (19–1–4) | Quinnipiac (20–1–4) | Quinnipiac (22–1–4) | Quinnipiac (23–2–4) | Quinnipiac (24–2–5) | Quinnipiac (26–2–5) | Quinnipiac (28–2–5) | Quinnipiac (30–2–5) | Clarkson (30–5–5) | 4. |
| 5. | Clarkson | Clarkson (2–0–0) | Harvard (0–0–0) | Harvard (0–0–0) | Quinnipiac (4–0–1) | North Dakota (6–2–2) | Bemidji State (10–2–2) | Northeastern (10–1–1) | Quinnipiac (9–1–3) | Clarkson (14–2–2) | Clarkson (15–3–2) T-5 | Bemidji State (13–5–2) | Clarkson (15–3–2) | Clarkson (17–3–2) | Clarkson (19–3–2) | Clarkson (20–3–3) | Clarkson (21–3–4) T-5 | Clarkson (23–3–4) | Clarkson (24–3–5) | Clarkson (26–3–5) | Clarkson (28–3–5) | Clarkson (29–4–5) | Quinnipiac (30–3–5) | 5. |
| 6. | North Dakota | North Dakota (2–0–0) | North Dakota (4–0–0) | Bemidji State (6–0–2) | Bemidji State (6–2–2) | Bemidji State (8–2–2) | North Dakota (6–2–2) | Bemidji State (10–4–2) | Clarkson (14–2–2) | Bemidji State (12–4–2) | Bemidji State (13–5–2) T-5 | Clarkson (15–3–2) | Bemidji State (13–5–2) | Bemidji State (15–5–2) | Northeastern (20–4–1) | Northeastern (22–4–1) | Northeastern (23–4–1) T-5 | Northeastern (25–4–1) | Northeastern (25–6–1) | Northeastern (26–7–1) | Northeastern (28–7–1) | Northeastern (28–8–1) | Northeastern (28–9–1) | 6. |
| 7. | Quinnipiac | Boston University (2–0–0) | Quinnipiac (3–0–1) | North Dakota (4–1–1) | North Dakota (5–1–2) | Quinnipiac (5–1–1) | Northeastern (8–1–1) | North Dakota (7–3–2) | Bemidji State (12–4–2) | Harvard (8–2–1) | Northeastern (13–4–1) | North Dakota (11–6–3) | North Dakota (11–6–3) | Northeastern (17–4–1) | Bemidji State (15–7–2) | Bemidji State (17–7–2) | Bemidji State (17–9–2) | Bemidji State (18–9–3) | Bemidji State (20–9–3) | Bemidji State (22–9–3) | Colgate (22–8–7) | Princeton (22–8–2) | Princeton (22–9–2) | 7. |
| 8. | Boston University | Quinnipiac (1–0–1) | Bemidji State (5–0–1) | Quinnipiac (3–0–1) | Harvard (0–1–0) | Northeastern (7–1–1) | Quinnipiac (6–1–2) | Quinnipiac (7–1–3) | Harvard (6–1–1) | Northeastern (11–4–1) | Harvard (8–4–1) | Northeastern (13–4–1) | Northeastern (14–4–1) | Harvard (10–4–1) | North Dakota (13–6–3) | North Dakota (13–8–3) | North Dakota (14–8–4) | Princeton (19–5–1) | Princeton (20–6–1) | Princeton (21–6–2) | North Dakota (18–11–5) | Colgate (22–9–7) | Colgate (22–9–7) | 8. |
| 9. | Bemidji State | Bemidji State (3–0–1) | Boston University (3–1–0) | Cornell (0–0–0) | Northeastern (6–1–1) | Harvard (1–1–1) | Harvard (3–1–1) | Harvard (5–1–1) | North Dakota (8–4–2) | North Dakota (9–5–2) | North Dakota (10–6–2) | Harvard (8–4–1) | Harvard (8–4–1) | North Dakota (11–6–3) | Princeton (15–4–1) | Princeton (15–4–1) | Princeton (17–5–1) | North Dakota (14–9–5) | North Dakota (15–10–5) | Colgate (20–7–7) | Princeton (22–8–2) | North Dakota (18–12–5) | North Dakota (18–12–5) | 9. |
| 10. | Cornell | Cornell (0–0–0) | Cornell (0–0–0) | Northeastern (4–1–1) | Dartmouth (1–0–0) | Princeton (4–0–0) | Princeton (5–1–0) | Princeton (5–2–1) | Colgate (7–2–5) | Minnesota Duluth (6–10–0) | Colgate (10–3–5) | Colgate (10–3–5) | Colgate (10–3–5) | Princeton (15–4–1) | Colgate (14–4–6) | Colgate (14–5–7) | Colgate (16–5–7) | Colgate (17–6–7) | Colgate (19–6–7) | North Dakota (16–11–5) | Bemidji State (22–11–3) | Bemidji State (22–11–3) | Bemidji State (22–11–3) | 10. |
| | Preseason Sep 21 | Week 1 Oct 5 | Week 2 Oct 12 | Week 3 Oct 19 | Week 4 Oct 26 | Week 5 Nov 2 | Week 6 Nov 9 | Week 7 Nov 16 | Week 8 Nov 23 | Week 9 Nov 30 | Week 10 Dec 7 | Week 11 Dec 14 | Week 12 Jan 4 | Week 13 Jan 11 | Week 14 Jan 18 | Week 15 Jan 25 | Week 16 Feb 1 | Week 17 Feb 8 | Week 18 Feb 15 | Week 19 Feb 22 | Week 20 Feb 29 | Week 21 Mar 7 | Week 22 (Final) Mar 21 | |
| | | None | None | Dropped: Boston University | Dropped: Cornell | Dropped: Dartmouth | None | None | Dropped: Princeton | Dropped: Colgate | Dropped: Minnesota Duluth | None | None | Dropped: Colgate | Dropped: Harvard | None | None | None | None | None | None | None | None | |

== USA Today ==
| | Preseason Sep 29 | Week 1 Oct 6 | Week 2 Oct 13 | Week 3 Oct 20 | Week 4 Oct 27 | Week 5 Nov 3 | Week 6 Nov 10 | Week 7 Nov 17 | Week 8 Nov 24 | Week 9 Dec 1 | Week 10 Dec 8 | Week 11 Dec 15 | Week 12 Jan 5 | Week 13 Jan 12 | Week 14 Jan 19 | Week 15 Jan 26 | Week 16 Feb 2 | Week 17 Feb 9 | Week 18 Feb 16 | Week 19 Feb 23 | Week 20 Mar 1 | Week 21 Mar 8 | Week 22 Mar 15 | Week 23 (Final) Mar 22 | |
|---|---|---|---|---|---|---|---|---|---|---|---|---|---|---|---|---|---|---|---|---|---|---|---|---|---|
| 1. | Minnesota (19) | Minnesota (2–0–0) (19) | Minnesota (4–0–0) (19) | Minnesota (6–0–0) (19) | Minnesota (8–0–0) (17) | Wisconsin (10–0–0) (10) | Wisconsin (10–0–0) (10) | Wisconsin (12–0–0) (11) | Wisconsin (14–0–0) (11) | Wisconsin (16–0–0) (12) | Wisconsin (18–0–0) (18) | Boston College (20–0–0) (16) | Boston College (20–0–0) (19) | Boston College (21–0–0) (19) | Boston College (23–0–0) (18) | Boston College (26–0–0) (18) | Boston College (27–0–0) (19) | Boston College (29–0–0) (19) | Boston College (32–0–0) (19) | Boston College (34–0–0) (19) | Boston College (36–0–0) (19) | Boston College (38–0–0) (19) | Boston College (39–0–0) (19) | Minnesota (35–4–1) (19) | 1. |
| 2. | Boston College | Boston College (2–0–0) | Wisconsin (4–0–0) | Wisconsin (6–0–0) | Boston College (8–0–0) (2) | Boston College (10–0–0) (7) | Boston College (11–0–0) (7) | Boston College (14–0–0) (7) | Boston College (15–0–0) (7) | Boston College (17–0–0) (7) | Boston College (19–0–0) (1) | Wisconsin (18–1–1) (2) | Wisconsin (18–1–1) | Wisconsin (20–1–1) | Wisconsin (22–1–1) (1) | Wisconsin (24–1–1) (1) | Wisconsin (26–1–1) | Wisconsin (28–1–1) | Wisconsin (30–1–1) | Minnesota (29–3–1) | Minnesota (31–3–1) | Wisconsin (34–3–1) | Wisconsin (35–3–1) | Boston College (40–1–0) | 2. |
| 3. | Wisconsin | Wisconsin (2–0–0) | Boston College (4–0–0) | Boston College (6–0–0) | Wisconsin (8–0–0) | Minnesota (9–1–0) (2) | Minnesota (9–1–0) (2) | Minnesota (11–1–0) (1) | Minnesota (13–1–0) (1) | Minnesota (15–1–0) | Minnesota (15–3–0) (1) | Minnesota (15–3–0) (1) | Minnesota (15–3–0) | Minnesota (18–3–0) | Minnesota (20–3–0) | Minnesota (22–3–0) | Minnesota (24–3–0) | Minnesota (25–3–1) | Minnesota (27–3–1) | Wisconsin (30–3–1) | Wisconsin (32–3–1) | Minnesota (32–4–1) | Minnesota (33–4–1) | Wisconsin (35–4–1) | 3. |
| 4. | Harvard | Harvard (0–0–0) | Harvard (0–0–0) | Clarkson (7–0–0) | Clarkson (9–0–0) | Clarkson (9–0–2) | Bemidji State (10–2–2) | Clarkson (13–1–2) | Northeastern (11–2–1) | Quinnipiac (11–1–3) | Quinnipiac (13–1–3) | Quinnipiac (14–1–3) | Quinnipiac (16–1–3) | Quinnipiac (17–1–4) | Quinnipiac (19–1–4) | Quinnipiac (20–1–4) | Quinnipiac (22–1–4) | Quinnipiac (23–2–4) | Quinnipiac (24–2–5) | Quinnipiac (26–2–5) | Quinnipiac (28–2–5) | Quinnipiac (30–2–5) | Clarkson (30–4–5) | Clarkson (30–5–5) | 4. |
| 5. | Clarkson | Clarkson (2–0–0) | Clarkson (5–0–0) | Harvard (0–0–0) | Quinnipiac (4–0–1) | Bemidji State (8–2–2) | Clarkson (10–1–2) | Northeastern (10–1–1) | Quinnipiac (9–1–3) | Bemidji State (12–4–2) | Bemidji State (13–5–2) | Bemidji State (13–5–2) | Bemidji State (13–5–2) | Clarkson (17–3–2) | Clarkson (19–3–2) | Northeastern (22–4–1) | Northeastern (23–4–1) | Clarkson (23–3–4) | Clarkson (24–3–5) | Clarkson (26–3–5) | Clarkson (28–3–5) | Clarkson (29–4–5) | Quinnipiac (30–3–5) | Quinnipiac (30–3–5) | 5. |
| 6. | North Dakota | North Dakota (2–0–0) | North Dakota (4–0–0) | Bemidji State (6–0–2) | Bemidji State (6–2–2) | North Dakota (6–2–2) | North Dakota (6–2–2) | Bemidji State (10–4–2) | Bemidji State (12–4–2) | Clarkson (14–2–2) | Northeastern (13–4–1) | Clarkson (15–3–2) | Clarkson (15–3–2) | Bemidji State (15–5–2) | Northeastern (20–4–1) | Clarkson (20–3–3) | Clarkson (21–3–4) | Northeastern (25–4–1) | Northeastern (25–6–1) | Northeastern (26–7–1) | Northeastern (28–7–1) | Northeastern (28–8–1) | Northeastern (28–9–1) | Northeastern (28–9–1) | 6. |
| 7. | Quinnipiac | Quinnipiac (1–0–1) | Quinnipiac (3–0–1) | Quinnipiac (3–0–1) | Harvard (0–1–0) | Quinnipiac (5–1–1) | Northeastern (8–1–1) | Quinnipiac (7–1–3) | Clarkson (14–2–2) | Northeastern (11–4–1) | Clarkson (15–3–2) | Northeastern (13–4–1) | North Dakota (11–6–3) | Northeastern (17–4–1) | Bemidji State (15–7–2) | Bemidji State (17–7–2) | Bemidji State (17–9–2) | Bemidji State (18–9–3) | Bemidji State (20–9–3) | Bemidji State (22–9–3) | Colgate (22–8–7) | Princeton (22–8–2) | Princeton (22–9–2) | Princeton (22–9–2) | 7. |
| 8. | Boston University | Boston University (2–0–0) | Bemidji State (5–0–1) | North Dakota (4–1–1) | North Dakota (5–1–2) | Northeastern (7–1–1) | Quinnipiac (6–1–2) | Harvard (5–1–1) T-8 | Harvard (6–1–1) | Harvard (8–2–1) | Harvard (8–4–1) | North Dakota (11–6–3) | Northeastern (14–4–1) | North Dakota (11–6–3) | North Dakota (13–6–3) | North Dakota (13–8–3) | North Dakota (14–8–4) | North Dakota (14–9–5) | Princeton (20–6–1) | Princeton (21–6–2) | North Dakota (18–11–5) | Colgate (22–9–7) | Colgate (22–9–7) | Colgate (22–9–7) | 8. |
| 9. | Northeastern T-9 | Bemidji State (3–0–1) | Boston University (3–1–0) | Northeastern (4–1–1) | Northeastern (6–1–1) | Harvard (1–1–1) | Harvard (3–1–1) | North Dakota (7–3–2) T-8 | North Dakota (8–4–2) | North Dakota (9–5–2) | North Dakota (10–6–2) | Harvard (8–4–1) | Harvard (8–4–1) | Harvard (10–4–1) | Princeton (15–4–1) | Princeton (15–4–1) | Princeton (17–5–1) | Princeton (19–5–1) | North Dakota (15–10–5) | Colgate (20–7–7) | Princeton (22–8–2) | North Dakota (18–12–5) | Bemidji State (22–11–3) | Bemidji State (22–11–3) | 9. |
| 10. | Bemidji State T-9 | Northeastern (1–0–1) | Cornell (0–0–0) | Boston University (3–3–0) | Dartmouth (1–0–0) | Princeton (4–0–0) | Princeton (5–1–0) | Princeton (5–2–1) | Minnesota Duluth (5–9–0) | Minnesota Duluth (6–10–0) | Princeton (9–4–1) | Princeton (11–4–1) | Princeton (13–4–1) | Princeton (15–4–1) | Colgate (14–4–6) | Colgate (14–5–7) | Colgate (16–5–7) | Colgate (17–6–7) | Colgate (19–6–7) | North Dakota (16–11–5) | Bemidji State (22–11–3) | Bemidji State (22–11–3) | North Dakota (18–12–5) | North Dakota (18–12–5) | 10. |
| | Preseason Sep 29 | Week 1 Oct 6 | Week 2 Oct 13 | Week 3 Oct 20 | Week 4 Oct 27 | Week 5 Nov 3 | Week 6 Nov 10 | Week 7 Nov 17 | Week 8 Nov 24 | Week 9 Dec 1 | Week 10 Dec 8 | Week 11 Dec 15 | Week 12 Jan 5 | Week 13 Jan 12 | Week 14 Jan 19 | Week 15 Jan 26 | Week 16 Feb 2 | Week 17 Feb 9 | Week 18 Feb 16 | Week 19 Feb 23 | Week 20 Mar 1 | Week 21 Mar 8 | Week 22 Mar 15 | Week 23 (Final) Mar 22 | |
| | | None | Dropped: Northeastern | Dropped: Cornell | Dropped: Boston University | Dropped: Dartmouth | None | None | Dropped: Princeton | None | Dropped: Minnesota Duluth | None | None | None | Dropped: Harvard | None | None | None | None | None | None | None | None | None | |
