= 2015–16 Merrimack Warriors women's ice hockey season =

- Conference: 9th WHEA
- Home ice: Volpe Complex

Record
- Overall: 5-26-3
- Home: 4-12-1
- Road: 1-13-2
- Neutral: 0-1-0

Coaches and captains
- Head coach: Erin Hamlen
- Assistant coaches: Brent Hill; Kacey Bellamy
- Captain(s): Marie Delarbre; Jackie Pieper.
- Alternate captain(s): Paige Sorenson; Dominique Kremer

The Merrimack Warriors represented Merrimack College in the Women's Hockey East Association during the 2015–16 NCAA Division I women's ice hockey season. It was the inaugural season of the varsity women's ice hockey team.

== Roster ==
=== 2015–16 Warriors ===
No.	Nat.	Player	Class	Pos	Height	DoB	Hometown	Previous team
4		Felila Manu	Freshman	D	5' 6" (1.68 m)		Anchorage, Alaska	East HS
5		Paige Sorensen (A)	Freshman	D	5' 7" (1.7 m)		Plymouth, Minnesota	Wayzata HS
6		Paige Voight	Freshman	F	5' 7" (1.7 m)		St. Michael, Minnesota	Cretin-Derham Hall
8		Baye Flanagan	Freshman	D	5' 7" (1.7 m)		Billerica, Massachusetts	Northern Cyclones
9		Dominique Kremer (A)	Freshman	F	5' 6" (1.68 m)		West Fargo, North Dakota	Shattuck-St. Mary's
10		Meghan Martin	Freshman	D	5' 4" (1.63 m)		Newport, Vermont	North American Hockey Academy
11		Jillian Batista	Freshman (RS)	F	5' 5" (1.65 m)		Tonawanda, New York	Kenmore East HS
12		Emily Volpe	Freshman	F	5' 6" (1.68 m)		Whitby, Ontario	Whitby Wolves
14		Jessica Kuhlman	Freshman	F	5' 6" (1.68 m)		Severna Park, Maryland	Pittsburgh Penguins Elite
15		Jackie Pieper (C)	Freshman (RS)	F	5' 7" (1.7 m)		Edina, Minnesota	Edina HS
17		Jessica Bonfe	Freshman	F	5' 9" (1.75 m)		Woodbury, Minnesota	Hill-Murray HS
18		Katelyn Rae	Freshman	F	5' 0" (1.52 m)		Courtice, Ontario	Whitby Wolves
19		Samantha Saulnier	Junior	F	5' 4" (1.63 m)		Somerville, Massachusetts	Southfield School
21		Annie Boekers	Freshman	F	5' 1" (1.55 m)		Otsego, Minnesota	Cretin-Derham Hall
22		Marie Delarbre (C)	Junior (RS)	F	5' 7" (1.7 m)		Füssen, Germany	EV Füssen
23		Beatrice Dufour	Freshman	D	5' 11" (1.8 m)		Sarnia, Ontario	Northern Collegiate Institute
25		Madison Morey	Freshman	F	5' 8" (1.73 m)		Fairbanks, Alaska	North American Hockey Academy
27		Alison Sexton	Freshman	F	5' 7" (1.7 m)		Stonewall, Manitoba	North American Hockey Academy
30		Chaislyn Burgio	Freshman (RS)	G	5' 8" (1.73 m)		Quincy, Massachusetts	Bay State Breakers
33		Kate Kowalchuk	Freshman	G	5' 7" (1.7 m)		Chestermere, Alberta	Pursuit of Excellence Academy
34		Samantha Ridgewell	Freshman	G	5' 9" (1.75 m)		Outlook, Saskatchewan	Notre Dame Jr.
		Maddie Santosuosso		G	4' 10" (1.47 m)		Topsfield, Massachusetts

== Schedule ==
Date	Opponent^{#}	Rank^{#}	Site	Decision	Result	Record
Regular Season
October 2	St. Cloud State*		Volpe Complex • North Andover, MA	Samantha Ridgewell	L 4–6	0–1–0
October 3	St. Cloud State*		Volpe Complex • North Andover, Massachusetts	Kate Kowalchuk	L 2–6	0–2–0
October 9	at Robert Morris*		RMU Island Sports Center • Neville Township, PA	Samantha Ridgewell	L 1–6	0–3–0
October 10	at Robert Morris*		RMU Island Sports Center • Neville Township, PA	Samantha Ridgewell	L 2–4	0–4–0
October 17	New Hampshire		Volpe Complex • North Andover, MA	Samantha Ridgewell	W 2–1	1–4–0 (1–0–0)
October 18	Maine		Volpe Complex • North Andover, MA	Samantha Ridgewell	L 1–2	1–5–0 (1–1–0)
October 23	#10 Colgate*		Volpe Complex • North Andover, MA	Samantha Ridgewell	L 3–4	1–6–0
October 24	#10 Colgate*		Volpe Complex • North Andover, MA	Samantha Ridgewell	W 4–2	2–6–0
October 30	#9 Northeastern		Volpe Complex • North Andover, MA	Samantha Ridgewell	L 1–5	2–7–0 (1–2–0)
November 7	at Connecticut		Freitas Ice Forum • Storrs, CT	Samantha Ridgewell	L 0–1	2–8–0 (1–3–0)
November 13	#7 Northeastern		Volpe Complex • North Andover, MA	Chaislyn Burgio	L 3–8	2–9–0 (1–4–0)
November 14	at #7 Northeastern		Matthews Arena • Boston, MA	Kate Kowalchuk	L 0–6	2–10–0 (1–5–0)
November 20	Boston University		Volpe Complex • North Andover, MA	Kate Kowalchuk	L 1–5	2–11–0 (1–6–0)
November 21	at Boston University		Walter Brown Arena • Boston, MA	Chaislyn Burgio	L 2–4	2–12–0 (1–7–0)
November 27	at Yale*		Ingalls Rink • New Haven, CT (Nutmeg Classic Opening Round)	Chaislyn Burgio	L 1–3	2–13–0
November 28	vs. Connecticut*		Ingalls Rink • New Haven, CT (Nutmeg Classic Consolation Game)	Kate Kowalchuk	L 1–4	2–14–0
December 4	at New Hampshire		Whittemore Center • Durham, NH	Samantha Ridgewell	L 1–4	2–15–0 (1–8–0)
December 5	New Hampshire		Volpe Complex • North Andover, MA	Samantha Ridgewell	L 1–2 ^{OT}	2–16–0 (1–9–0)
December 11	at Providence		Schneider Arena • Providence, RI	Samantha Ridgewell	L 3–4	2–17–0 (1–10–0)
January 4, 2016	at Vermont		Gutterson Field House • Burlington, VT	Samantha Ridgewell	W 2–1 ^{OT}	3–17–0 (2–10–0)
January 6	at St. Lawrence*		Appleton Arena • Canton, NY	Samantha Ridgewell	L 2–6	3–18–0
January 9	Connecticut		Volpe Complex • North Andover, MA	Samantha Ridgewell	L 3–4	3–19–0 (2–11–0)
January 10	at Connecticut		Freitas Ice Forum • Storrs, CT	Samantha Ridgewell	T 2–2 ^{OT}	3–19–1 (2–11–1)
January 15	#1 Boston College		Volpe Complex • North Andover, MA	Samantha Ridgewell	L 0–2	3–20–1 (2–12–1)
January 16	at #1 Boston College		Kelley Rink • Chestnut Hill, MA	Samantha Ridgewell	L 0–6	3–21–1 (2–13–1)
January 19	Brown*		Volpe Complex • North Andover, MA	Samantha Ridgewell	W 4–1	4–21–1
January 26	#1 Boston College		Volpe Complex • North Andover, MA	Samantha Ridgewell	L 1–4	4–22–1 (2–14–1)
January 30	at Boston University		Walter Brown Arena • Boston, MA	Samantha Ridgewell	L 2–6	4–23–1 (2–15–1)
February 6	at Maine		Alfond Arena • Orono, ME	Samantha Ridgewell	L 0–4	4–24–1 (2–16–1)
February 7	at Maine		Alfond Arena • Orono, ME	Samantha Ridgewell	L 0–1	4–25–1 (2–17–1)
February 13	Providence		Volpe Complex • North Andover, MA	Samantha Ridgewell	L 1–4	4–26–1 (2–18–1)
February 14	at Providence		Schneider Arena • Providence, RI	Samantha Ridgewell	T 2–2 ^{OT}	4–26–2 (2–18–2)
February 19	Vermont		Volpe Complex • North Andover, MA	Samantha Ridgewell	W 2–1	5–26–2 (3–18–2)
February 20	Vermont		Volpe Complex • North Andover, MA	Samantha Ridgewell	T 3–3 ^{OT}	5–26–3 (3–18–3)
*Non-conference game. ^{#}Rankings from USCHO.com Poll.

== Awards and honors ==
- Dec 14: Paige Voight named WHEA Rookie of the Week
- Jan. 18: Samantha Ridgewell named WHEA Defensive Player of the Week
- Feb. 2: Kaitlyn Rae named WHEA Rookie of the Month
- Mar. 2: Paige Voight, Samantha Ridgewell named to Pro Ambitions All Rookie Team
- Mar. 16: Asst Coach Kacey Bellamy wins Isobel Cup with Boston Pride
