= 2015–16 New Hampshire Wildcats women's ice hockey season =

- Conference: 5th WHEA
- Home ice: Whittemore Center

Record
- Overall: 11-24-1
- Home: 5-11-0
- Road: 6-13-1

Coaches and captains
- Head coach: Hilary Witt
- Assistant coaches: Stephanie Jones; Bill Bowes
- Captain: Sara Carlson
- Alternate captain(s): Heather Kashman; Cassandra Vilgrain

The New Hampshire Wildcats represented the University of New Hampshire in Women's Hockey East Association play during the 2015–16 NCAA Division I women's ice hockey season.

== Offseason ==
- July 1: Brooke Avery named to Hockey East All Academic All-Star Team

=== Recruiting ===
| Player | Position | Nationality | Notes |
|---|---|---|---|
| Caitlyn Radatovich | Forward | United States | Played with Pittsburgh Penguins U19 |
| Devan Taylor | Forward | United States | Played for Assabet Valley U19 |
| Marie-Jo Pelletier | Defense | Canada | Played for Team Canada U18 |
| Jenna Rheault | Defense | United States | Played for St. Paul's School |
| Hilary Cashin | Goaltender | Canada | Played for New Hampton School |
| Kyra Smith | Goaltender | United States | Pomfret School |

== Roster ==
=== 2015–16 Wildcats ===
| No. | Nat. | Player | Class | Pos | Height | DoB | Hometown | Previous team |
|---|---|---|---|---|---|---|---|---|
| 1 | | Kyra Smith | Freshman | G | 5' 9" (1.75 m) | | Littleton, Colorado | Pomfret School |
| 2 | | Ashley Wilkes | Junior | G | 5' 9" (1.75 m) | | North Pole, Alaska | North American Hockey Academy |
| 3 | | Haley Breedlove | Senior | F | 6' 0" (1.83 m) | | Plano, Texas | U19 Alliance Bulldogs |
| 4 | | Heather Kashman (A) | Senior | F | 5' 9" (1.75 m) | | Edmonton, Alberta | Edmonton Thunder |
| 5 | | Julia Fedeski | Sophomore | D | 5' 10" (1.78 m) | | Algonquin Highlands, Ontario | Toronto Aeros |
| 6 | | Jonna Curtis | Junior | F | 5' 4" (1.63 m) | | Elk River, Minnesota | U19 Minnesota Jr. Whitecaps |
| 7 | | Sara Carlson (C) | Senior | F | 5' 0" (1.52 m) | | Hutchinson, Minnesota | Hutchinson HS] |
| 8 | | Nicoline Jensen | Senior | F | 5' 5" (1.65 m) | | Rodovre, Denmark | Danish National Team |
| 10 | | Amy Schlegal | Sophomore | D | 5' 7" (1.7 m) | | Blaine, Minnesota | Blaine HS |
| 11 | | Kaylee Forster | Sophomore | D | 5' 8" (1.73 m) | | Zimmerman, Minnesota | Elk River HS |
| 12 | | Taylor Wenczkowski | Freshman | F | 5' 7" (1.7 m) | | Rochester, New Hampshire | Boston Shamrocks |
| 13 | | Amy Boucher | Freshman | F | 5' 7" (1.7 m) | | Edmonton, Alberta |
| 14 | | Jenna Rheault | Freshman | D | 5' 7" (1.7 m) | | Deering, New Hampshire | St. Paul's School |
| 16 | | Ali Praus | Sophomore | F | 5' 10" (1.78 m) | | Long Lake, Minnesota | Benilde St. Margaret's HS |
| 17 | | Devan Taylor | Freshman | F | 5' 7" (1.7 m) | | Billerica, Massachusetts | Lawrence Academy |
| 18 | | Kate Haslett | Sophomore | D | 5' 4" (1.63 m) | | Rothesay, New Brunswick | Brooks School |
| 19 | | Cassandra Vilgrain (A) | Junior | F | 5' 5" (1.65 m) | | Calgary, Alberta | Edge School for Athletes |
| 20 | | Margo Lund | Senior | F | 5' 9" (1.75 m) | | White Bear Lake, Minnesota | Hill-Murray School |
| 21 | | Marie-Jo Pelletier | Freshman | D | 4' 11" (1.5 m) | | Dalhousie, New Brunswick | Team Canada U18 |
| 23 | | Brooke Avery | Sophomore | F | 5' 10" (1.78 m) | | Loudon, New Hampshire | St. Paul's School |
| 26 | | Carlee Toews | Sophomore | F | 5' 5" (1.65 m) | | Grande Prairie, Alberta | Okanagan Hockey Academy |
| 27 | | Caitlyn Radatovich | Freshman | F | 5' 10" (1.78 m) | | Advance, North Carolina | Pittsburgh Penguins U19 |
| 29 | | Hilary Cashin | Freshman | G | 5' 11" (1.8 m) | | Fredericton, New Brunswick | New Hampton School |
| 35 | | Vilma Vaattovaara | Senior | G | 5' 8" (1.73 m) | | Veikkola, Finland | Hameenlinnan Lyseon Lukio |

== Schedule ==
| Date | Opponent^{#} | Rank^{#} | Site | Decision | Result | Record |
Regular Season
| October 2 | Maine | | Whittemore Center • Durham, NH | Hilary Cashin | L 0–4 | 0–1–0 (0–1–0) |
| October 9 | Lindenwood* | | Whittemore Center • Durham, NH | Vilma Vaattovaara | L 2–4 | 0–2–0 |
| October 10 | Syracuse* | | Whittemore Center • Durham, NH | Kyra Smith | L 2–3 | 0–3–0 |
| October 17 | at Merrimack | | Volpe Complex • North Andover, MA | Ashley Wilkes | L 1–2 | 0–4–0 (0–2–0) |
| October 18 | at #2 Boston College | | Kelley Rink • Chestnut Hill, MA | Vilma Vaattovaara | L 0–6 | 0–5–0 (0–3–0) |
| October 23 | at #4 Clarkson* | | Cheel Arena • Potsdam, NY | Vilma Vaattovaara | L 2–4 | 0–6–0 |
| October 24 | at #4 Clarkson* | | Cheel Arena • Potsdam, NY | Vilma Vaattovaara | L 4–6 | 0–7–0 |
| October 30 | at Vermont | | Gutterson Fieldhouse • Burlington, VT | Vilma Vaattovaara | W 4–0 | 1–7–0 (1–3–0) |
| November 1 | Boston University | | Whittemore Center • Durham, NH | Vilma Vaattovaara | L 3–5 | 1–8–0 (1–4–0) |
| November 7 | at Providence | | Schneider Arena • Providence, RI | Vilma Vaattovaara | L 4–5 | 1–9–0 (1–5–0) |
| November 8 | at Connecticut | | Freitas Ice Forum • Storrs, CT | Kyra Smith | W 2–1 | 2–9–0 (2–5–0) |
| November 13 | #2 Boston College | | Whittemore Center • Durham, NH | Kyra Smith | L 1–6 | 2–10–0 (2–6–0) |
| November 14 | at #2 Boston College | | Kelley Rink • Chestnut Hill, MA | Kyra Smith | L 1–6 | 2–11–0 (2–7–0) |
| November 18 | at #9 Harvard* | | Bright-Landry Hockey Center • Allston, MA | Kyra Smith | L 0–4 | 2–12–0 |
| November 21 | Providence | | Whittemore Center • Durham, NH | Kyra Smith | W 3–2 | 3–12–0 (3–7–0) |
| November 22 | Providence | | Whittemore Center • Durham, NH | Kyra Smith | L 1–4 | 3–13–0 (3–8–0) |
| November 27 | at Rensselaer* | | Houston Field House • Troy, NY | Kyra Smith | T 3–3 ^{OT} | 3–13–1 |
| November 28 | at Rensselaer* | | Houston Field House • Troy, NY | Kyra Smith | W 2–1 | 4–13–1 |
| December 4 | Merrimack | | Whittemore Center • Durham, NH | Kyra Smith | W 4–1 | 5–13–1 (4–8–0) |
| December 5 | at Merrimack | | Volpe Complex • North Andover, MA | Kyra Smith | W 2–1 ^{OT} | 6–13–1 (5–8–0) |
| December 8 | Dartmouth* | | Whittemore Center • Durham, NH | Kyra Smith | W 3–2 | 7–13–1 |
| December 11 | at Quinnipiac* | | TD Bank Sports Center • Hamden, CT | Kyra Smith | L 0–6 | 7–14–1 |
| December 13 | Yale* | | Whittemore Center • Durham, NH | Kyra Smith | W 5–2 | 8–14–1 |
| January 9, 2016 | at Northeastern | | Matthews Arena • Boston, MA | Kyra Smith | L 2–4 | 8–15–1 (5–9–0) |
| January 10 | Northeastern | | Whittemore Center • Durham, NH | Kyra Smith | L 2–5 | 8–16–1 (5–10–0) |
| January 23 | at Maine | | Alfond Arena • Orono, ME | Kyra Smith | W 5–1 | 9–16–1 (6–10–0) |
| January 24 | at Maine | | Alfond Arena • Orono, ME | Kyra Smith | W 3–0 | 10–16–1 (7–10–0) |
| January 29 | at Northeastern | | Matthews Arena • Boston, MA | Kyra Smith | L 2–5 | 10–17–1 (7–11–0) |
| February 5 | Vermont | | Whittemore Center • Durham, NH | Kyra Smith | L 1–2 | 10–18–1 (7–12–0) |
| February 6 | Vermont | | Whittemore Center • Durham, NH | Kyra Smith | L 2–3 | 10–19–1 (7–13–0) |
| February 13 | at Boston University | | Walter Brown Arena • Boston, MA | Kyra Smith | L 4–6 | 10–20–1 (7–14–0) |
| February 14 | Boston University | | Whittemore Center • Durham, NH | Vilma Vaattovaara | L 2–6 | 10–21–1 (7–15–0) |
| February 20 | Connecticut | | Whittemore Center • Durham, NH | Kyra Smith | W 2–1 | 11–21–1 (8–15–0) |
| February 21 | Connecticut | | Whittemore Center • Durham, NH | Kyra Smith | L 1–2 ^{OT} | 11–22–1 (8–16–0) |
WHEA Tournament
| February 26 | at Connecticut* | | Freitas Ice Forum • Storrs, CT (Quarterfinal, Game 1) | Vilma Vaattovaara | L 2–3 | 11–23–1 |
| February 27 | at Connecticut* | | Freitas Ice Forum • Storrs, CT (Quarterfinal, Game 2) | Vilma Vaattovaara | L 3–4 ^{3OT} | 11–24–1 |
*Non-conference game. ^{#}Rankings from USCHO.com Poll.
