= Kaitlin Burt =

American ice hockey goaltender (born 1997)

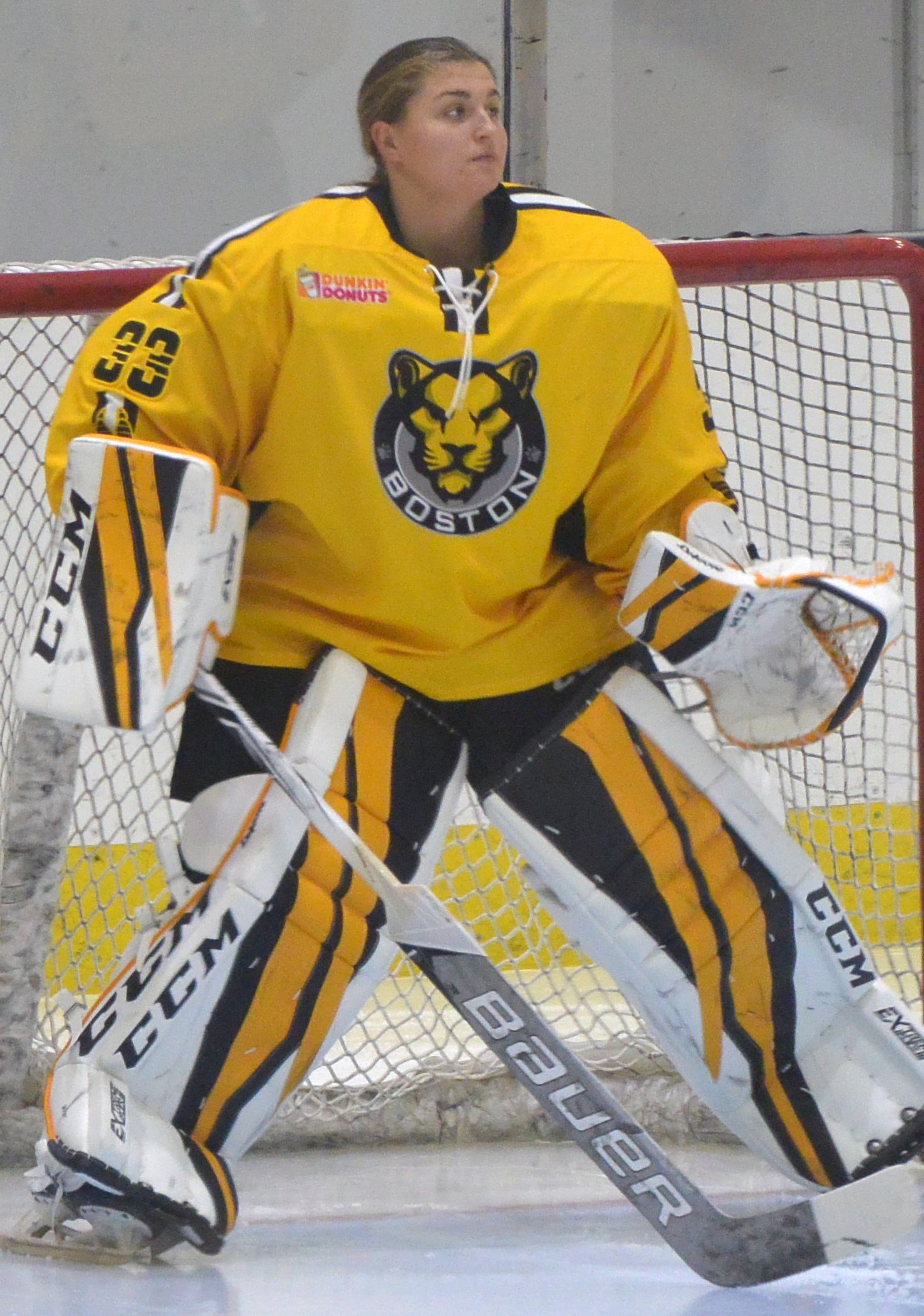
- Burt with the Boston Pride in November 2018
- Born: January 26, 1997 (age 29) Lynn, Massachusetts, United States
- Height: 170 cm (5 ft 7 in)
- Position: Goaltender
- Catches: Left
- PHF team Former teams: Metropolitan Riveters: Boston Pride; PWHPA New Hampshire; PWHPA New England; Boston College Eagles
- National team: United States
- Playing career: 2018–present

Kaitlin "Katie" Burt (born January 26, 1997) is an American ice hockey goaltender who played in the now defunct Premier Hockey Federation (PHF) with the Metropolitan Riveters. She was selected first overall by the Boston Pride in the 2017 NWHL Draft.

== Playing career ==
=== NCAA ===
Following her freshman season with the Boston College Eagles women's ice hockey program, she captured the Hockey East Goaltending Championship. She was recognized as a Hockey East All-Rookie Team selection and was also a Second Team All-Star selection. She had 35 starts and recorded a 1.11 goals against average (GAA).

As a sophomore, she captured the Hockey East Goaltending Championship for the second straight year. She posted a program record 35–1–0 record, losing her only game in the 2016 NCAA Frozen Four championship game. In Hockey East play, she recorded an undefeated mark of 20–0–0.

In 2018, she broke Noora Räty's record for all-time NCAA wins.

=== Professional ===
Selected first overall in the 2017 NWHL Draft, Burt signed her first professional contract on June 25, 2018, with the Boston Pride of the National Women's Hockey League (NWHL; rebranded as PHF in 2021). The Pride had obtained the first round pick of the Connecticut Whale in a trade that sent Zoe Hickel to the Whale on February 7, 2017. Burt played 16 games in her rookie season with the Pride, posting a .920 SV% and 2.26 GAA. She was named to the 2019 NWHL All-Star Game and as a finalist for the NWHL Goaltender of the Year award.

In May 2019, she left the PHF to join the New England chapter of the Professional Women's Hockey Players Association (PWHPA).

Burt returned to the Boston Pride in the 2021–22 PHF season and won the 2022 Isobel Cup with the team.

=== International ===
Burt competed for the United States women's national under-18 ice hockey team in 2014 and 2015. At the 2014 IIHF World Women's U18 Championship, Burt emerged with a silver medal. The following year, she would help the US capture the gold at the 2015 IIHF World Women's U18 Championship. Burt competed for Team Americas at the 2019 Aurora Games.

== Personal life ==
Burt has a degree in economics. She previously worked as a ball girl for the Boston Red Sox.

== Career statistics ==
			Regular season									Playoffs
Season	Team	League	GP	W	L	T/OT	MIN	GA	SO	GAA	SV%	GP	W	L	MIN	GA	SO	GAA	SV%
2014–15	Boston College	NCAA	35	30	3	2	2061	38	10	1.11	.941	—	—	—	—	—	—	—	—
2015–16	Boston College	NCAA	36	35	1	0	2097	43	13	1.23	.943	—	—	—	—	—	—	—	—
2016–17	Boston College	NCAA	37	26	6	5	2225	57	8	1.54	.935	—	—	—	—	—	—	—	—
2017–18	Boston College	NCAA	38	30	5	3	2305	75	4	1.95	.933	—	—	—	—	—	—	—	—
2018–19	Boston Pride	NWHL	16	10	5	0	869	35	1	2.42	.920	1	0	1	60	4	0	4.00	.897
2019–20	New England	PWHPA	—	—	—	—	—	—	—	—	—	—	—	—	—	—	—	—	—
2020–21	New Hampshire	PWHPA	3	0	3	0	180	15	0	5.00	.881	—	—	—	—	—	—	—	—
2021–22	Boston Pride	PHF	11	7	4	0	526	16	3	1.41	.958	3	3	0	180	3	1	1.00	.965
PHF totals			27	17	9	0	1395	51	4	2.19	.937	4	3	1	240	7	1	1.75	.944

== Awards and honours ==
- Independent School League co-MVP (2011–12)
- ACC Academic Honor Roll (2014–15)
- Hockey East All-Rookie Team (2014–15)
- Hockey East Second Team All-Star (2014–15)
- Hockey East Goaltending Champion (2014–15)
- Boston College Athletic Director's Award for Academic Achievement (2015–16)

Preceded by Kelsey Koelzer (2016)	First Pick Overall, NWHL Draft (2017)	Succeeded by Annie Pankowski (2018)
