= 2015–16 NCAA Division I women's ice hockey season =

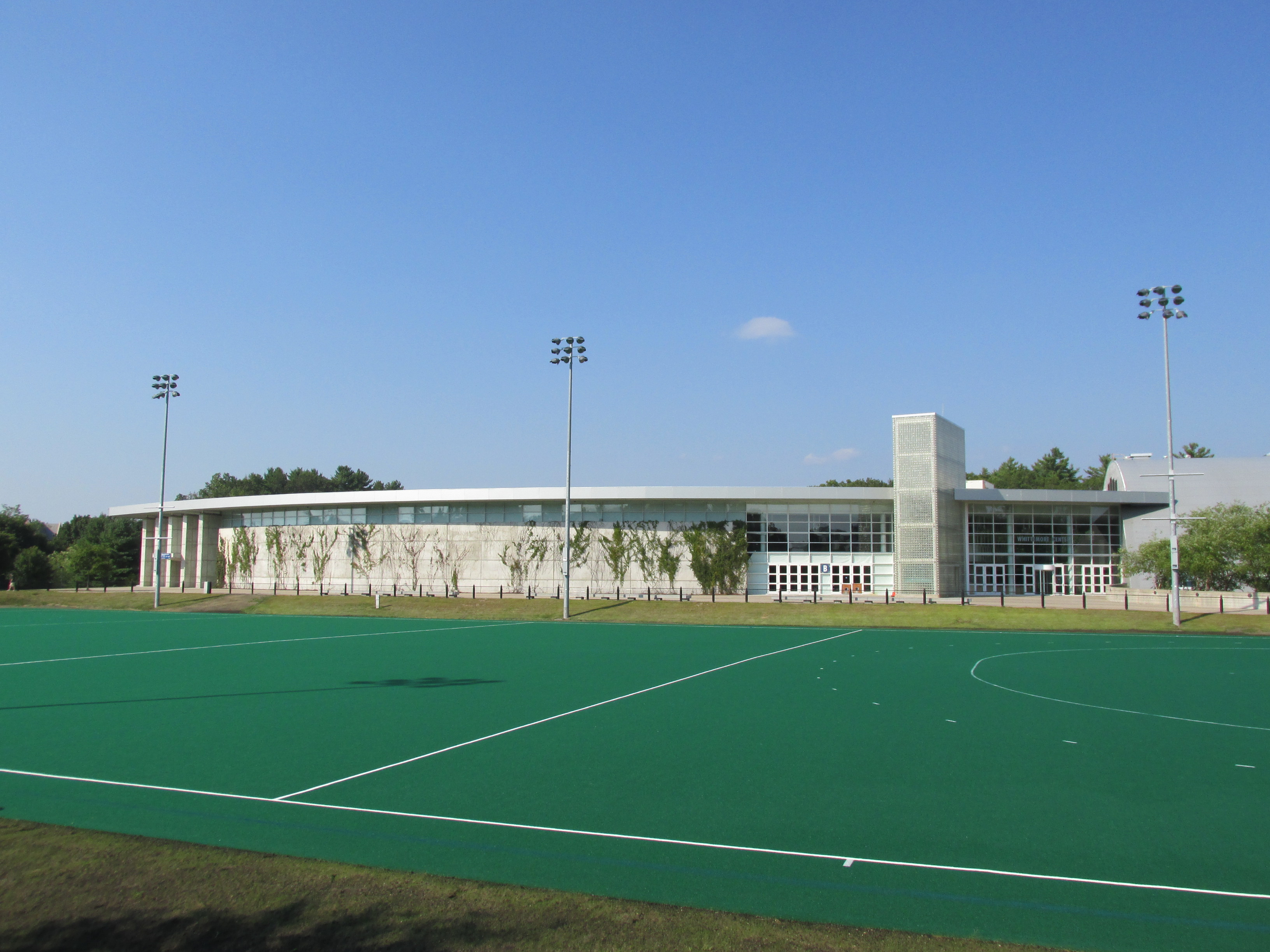
- University of New Hampshire's Whittemore Center in Durham, NH was the site for the 2016 Frozen Four (Women)
- Duration: September 27, 2015– March 20, 2016
- NCAA tournament: 2016
- National championship: Whittemore Center; Durham, NH
- NCAA champion: Minnesota Golden Gophers
- Patty Kazmaier Award: Kendall Coyne, Northeastern ()

The 2015–16 NCAA Division I women's ice hockey season began in September 2015 and ended with the 2016 NCAA Division I women's ice hockey tournament's championship game in March 2016.

== Pre-season polls ==
The top 10 from USCHO.com, September 21, 2015, and the top 10 from USA Today/USA Hockey Magazine, First place votes are in parentheses.

USCHO.com
Ranking	Team
1	Minnesota (15)
2	Boston College
3	Wisconsin
4	Harvard
5	Clarkson
6	North Dakota
7	Quinnipiac
8	Boston University
9	Bemidji State
10	Cornell

USA Today/USA Hockey Magazine
Ranking	Team
1	Minnesota (19)
2	Wisconsin
3	Boston College
4	Harvard
5	Clarkson
6	North Dakota
7	Quinnipiac
8	Boston University
9 – tie	Northeastern
9 – tie	Bemidji State

== Regular season ==
=== Standings ===
- 2015–16 College Hockey America standings
  	Conference							Overall					
  	GP	W	L	T	PTS	GF	GA	GP	W	L	T	GF	GA
  Mercyhurst†*	20	14	3	3	31	55	26	35	19	11	5	92	74
  Syracuse	20	14	4	2	30	56	28	36	19	14	3	96	77
  Penn State	20	6	8	6	18	33	35	37	12	19	6	65	76
  Robert Morris	20	7	9	4	18	52	57	38	17	16	9	108	97
  Lindenwood	20	5	11	4	14	31	46	37	9	24	4	64	102
  RIT	20	4	15	1	9	25	60	36	8	27	1	51	108
  Championship: Mercyhurst † indicates conference regular season champion * indicates conference tournament champion Current rankings: USCHO.com Division I women's poll
- Rankings based on number of wins in the conference
- 2015–16 Division I Independents standings
  	Overall					
  	GP	W	L	T	GF	GA
  Sacred Heart	27	12	13	2	68	60
- 2015–16 ECAC Hockey standings
  	Conference							Overall					
  	GP	W	L	T	PTS	GF	GA	GP	W	L	T	GF	GA
  #5 Quinnipiac†*	22	16	2	4	36	70	18	38	30	3	5	118	35
  #4 Clarkson	22	14	3	5	33	78	30	40	30	5	5	140	54
  #7 Princeton	22	14	6	2	30	67	41	33	22	9	2	102	61
  #8 Colgate	22	12	5	5	29	58	49	38	22	9	7	109	86
  Harvard	22	12	7	3	27	53	33	32	17	12	2	78	59
  St. Lawrence	22	9	8	5	23	45	47	38	17	15	6	93	98
  Cornell	22	9	9	4	22	49	58	31	13	14	4	72	87
  Rensselaer	22	8	9	5	21	38	49	34	10	17	7	62	80
  Yale	22	9	11	2	20	58	62	29	10	17	2	71	94
  Dartmouth	22	6	13	3	15	43	51	28	6	19	3	51	74
  Brown	22	1	18	3	5	25	89	29	3	23	3	37	114
  Union	22	0	19	3	3	14	71	34	0	28	6	25	104
  Championship: Quinnipiac † indicates conference regular season champion * indicates conference tournament champion Final rankings:USCHO.com Division I women's poll
- 2015–16 Western Collegiate Hockey Association standings
  	Conference								Overall					
  	GP	W	L	T	SW	PTS	GF	GA	GP	W	L	T	GF	GA
  #3 Wisconsin*†	28	24	3	1	1	74	100	22	40	35	4	1	154	29
  #1 Minnesota	28	24	3	1	0	73	139	39	40	35	4	1	187	51
  #10 Bemidji State	28	17	9	2	1	54	56	51	36	22	11	3	77	68
  #8 North Dakota	28	13	10	5	2	46	54	49	35	18	12	5	79	62
  St. Cloud State	28	9	15	4	3	34	44	88	35	13	18	4	63	115
  Minnesota Duluth	28	10	17	1	0	31	67	84	37	15	21	1	90	109
  Ohio State	28	6	21	1	1	20	58	110	36	10	25	1	80	134
  Minnesota State	28	0	25	3	0	3	41	116	36	3	29	4	55	137
  Championship: Wisconsin † indicates conference regular season champion * indicates conference tournament champion Current rankings: USCHO.com Division I women's poll
- 2015–16 WHEA standings
  	Conference							Overall					
  	GP	W	L	T	PTS	GF	GA	GP	W	L	T	GF	GA
  #2 Boston College†*	24	24	0	0	48	127	27	41	40	1	0	213	51
  #6 Northeastern	24	20	4	0	40	110	45	38	28	9	1	163	94
  Boston University	24	17	5	2	36	96	70	39	23	14	2	140	119
  Connecticut	24	11	10	3	25	52	61	37	17	15	5	82	93
  New Hampshire	24	8	16	0	16	51	75	36	11	24	1	79	117
  Vermont	24	6	15	3	15	47	77	37	9	25	3	64	121
  Providence	24	6	16	2	14	44	88	36	10	24	2	72	136
  Maine	24	6	17	1	13	40	75	35	10	23	2	61	105
  Merrimack	24	3	18	3	9	33	82	34	5	26	3	57	124
  Championship: Boston College † indicates conference regular season champion * indicates conference tournament champion Current rankings: USCHO.com Division I women's poll
  *Rankings based on number of wins in the conference

== Player stats ==
=== Scoring leaders ===
The following players lead the NCAA in points at the conclusion of games played on March 24, 2016.

Player	Class	Team	GP	G	A	Pts
Alex Carpenter	Senior	Boston College	41	43	45	88
Kendall Coyne	Senior	Northeastern	37	50	34	84
Haley Skarupa	Senior	Boston College	41	35	44	79
Dani Cameranesi	Junior	Minnesota	40	33	35	68
Hannah Brandt	Senior	Minnesota	38	25	39	64
Denisa Křížová	Sophomore	Northeastern	37	20	39	59
Annie Pankowski	Sophomore	Wisconsin	40	22	36	58
Sarah Potomak	Freshman	Minnesota	38	15	39	54
Taylar Cianfarano	Sophomore	Quinnipiac	37	28	24	52
Megan Keller	Sophomore	Boston College	41	12	40	52

=== Leading goaltenders ===
The following goaltenders lead the NCAA in goals against average at the conclusion of games played on March 24, 2016, while playing at least 33% of their team's total minutes.

Player	Class	Team	GP	Min	W	L	T	GA	SO	SV%	GAA
Ann-Renee Desbiens	Junior	Wisconsin	38	2279:18	33	4	1	29	21	.960	0.76
Sydney Rossman	Junior	Quinnipiac	38	2342:10	29	3	5	35	16	.949	0.90
Katie Burt	Sophomore	Boston College	36	2096:49	35	1	0	43	13	.943	1.23
Amanda Leveille	Senior	Minnesota	34	1957:32	29	4	1	42	10	.942	1.29
Shea Tiley	Sophomore	Clarkson	36	2090:50	27	4	5	46	12	.931	1.32

== Awards ==
=== WCHA ===
Award		Recipient
Player of the Year		Ann-Renee Desbiens, Wisconsin
Outstanding Student-Athlete of the Year		Shelby Amsley-Benzie, North Dakota
Defensive Player of the Year		Ivana Bilic, Bemidji State
Rookie of the Year		Sarah Potomak, Minnesota
Scoring Champion		Dani Cameranesi, Minnesota
Goaltending Champion		Ann-Renee Desbiens, Wisconsin
Coach of the Year		Mark Johnson, Wisconsin
All-WCHA Teams
First Team	Position	Second Team
Ann-Renee Desbiens, Wisconsin	G	Brittni Mowat, Bemidji State
Courtney Burke, Wisconsin	D	Milica McMillen, Minnesota
Lee Stecklein, Minnesota	D	Jenny Ryan, Wisconsin
Hannah Brandt, Minnesota	F	Emily Clark, Wisconsin
Dani Cameranesi, Minnesota	F	Ashleigh Brykaliuk, Minnesota Duluth
Annie Pankowski, Wisconsin	F	Amy Menke, North Dakota
Third Team	Position	Rookie Team
Shelby Amsley-Benzie, North Dakota	G	Maddy Rooney, Minnesota Duluth
Ivana Bilic, Bemidji State	D	Anna Kilponen, North Dakota
Halli Krzyzaniak, North Dakota	D	Melissa Hunt, Bemidji State
Sarah Nurse, Wisconsin	F	Julia Tilke, St. Cloud State
Sarah Potomak, Minnesota	F	Sarah Potomak, Minnesota
Molly Illikainen, St. Cloud State	F	Sam Cogen, Wisconsin

=== CHA ===
Award		Recipient
Player of the Year		Melissa Piacentini, F, Syracuse
Rookie of the Year		Rachael Smith, F, Mercyhurst
Goaltender Trophy (Best GAA)		Sarah McDonnell, Mercyhurst
Defenseman of the Year		Nicole Renault, Syracuse
Defensive Forward of the Year (Tie)		Jessica Sibley, Syracuse
Defensive Forward of the Year (Tie)		Micayla Catanzariti, Penn State
Sportsmanship Award		Jill Holdcroft, Penn State
Coach of the Year		Mike Sisti, Mercyhurst
CHA All-Conference Teams
First Team	Position	Second Team
Nicole Hensley, Lindenwood	G	Celine Whitlinger, Penn State
Mikaela Lowater, Robert Morris	D	Megan Quinn, Syracuse
Nicole Renault, Syracuse	D	J'Nai Mahadeo, Mercyhurst
Shara Jasper, Lindenwood	F	Melissa Piacentini, Syracuse
Stephanie Grossi, Syracuse	F	Jessica Sibley, Syracuse
Brittany Howard, Robert Morris	F	Amy Petersen, Penn State
Rookie Team	Position	–
Sarah McDonnell, Mercyhurst	G	
Reagan Rust, RIT	D	
Molly Blasen, Mercyhurst	D	
Maggie LaGue, Robert Morris	D	
Rachael Smith, Mercyhurst	F	
Shannon Morris-Reade, Lindenwood	F	
Sarah Quaranta, Robert Morris	F	

=== Women's Hockey East Association (WHEA) ===
Award		Recipient
Cami Granato Award (Player of the Year)		Kendall Coyne, Northeastern
Pro Ambitions Rookie of the Year		Makenna Newkirk, Boston College
Hockey East Coach of the Year		Katie King-Crowley, Boston College
Best Defensive Forward		Leah Buress, Connecticut
Best Defenseman		Megan Keller, Boston College
Goaltender of the Year		Katie Burt, Boston College
Sportmanship Award		Sara Carlson, New Hampshire
Army ROTC Three Stars Award		Kendall Coyne, Northeastern
Scoring Champion		Kendall Coyne, Northeastern
Hockey East All-Star Teams
First Team	Position	Second Team
Elaine Chuli, Connecticut	G	Brittany Bugalski, Northeastern
Lexi Bender, Boston College	D	Jordan Krause, Northeastern
Megan Keller, Boston College	D	Taylor Willard, Vermont
Alex Carpenter, Boston College	F	Victoria Bach, Boston University
Kendall Coyne, Northeastern	F	Rebecca Leslie, Boston University
Haley Skarupa, Boston College	F	Denisa Křížová, Northeastern
Honorable Mention	Position	Rookie Team
Katie Burt, Boston College	G	Brittany Bugalski, Northeastern
	G	Samantha Ridgewell, Merrimack
Heather Mottau, Northeastern	D	Maddie Hartman, Northeastern
Alexis Crossley, Boston University	D	Alyson Matteau, Connecticut
Dana Trivigno, Boston College	F	Sammy Davis, Boston University
Jonna Curtis, New Hampshire	F	Makenna Newkirk, Boston College
	F	Christina Putigna, Providence
	F	Paige Voight, Merrimack

=== ECAC ===
Award		Recipient
Player of the Year		Taylar Cianfarano, Quinnipiac
Best Forward		Taylar Cianfarano, Quinnipiac
Best Defenseman		Kelsey Koelzer, Princeton
Rookie of the Year		Karlie Lund, Princeton
Goaltender of the Year		Sydney Rossman, Quinnipiac
Sportmanship Award		St. Lawrence
Mandi Schwartz Student-Athlete of the Year		Kristen Tamberg, Quinnipiac
Coach of the Year		Jeff Kampersal, Princeton
All-ECAC Teams
First Team	Position	Second Team
Sydney Rossman, Quinnipiac	G	Emerance Maschmeyer, Harvard
Kelsey Koelzer, Princeton	D	Amanda Boulier, St. Lawrence
Erin Ambrose, Clarkson	D	Kristen Tamberg, Quinnipiac
Taylar Cianfarano, Quinnipiac	F	Sydney Daniels, Harvard
Cayley Mercer, Clarkson	F	Miye D'Oench, Harvard
Karlie Lund, Princeton	F	Olivia Howe, Clarkson
Third Team	Position	Rookie Team
Lovisa Selander, Rensselaer	G	Lovisa Selander, Rensselaer
Renata Fast, Clarkson	D	Micah Hart, Cornell
Michelle Picard, Harvard	D	Stephanie Sucharda, Clarkson
Emma Woods, Quinnipiac	F	Loren Gabel, Clarkson
Laura Stacey, Dartmouth	F	Karlie Lund, Princeton
Nicole Kosta, Quinnipiac	F	Melissa Samoskevich, Quinnipiac

=== Patty Kazmaier Award ===
Patty Kazmaier Award Finalists
Player	Position	School
Kendall Coyne	Forward	Northeastern
Alex Carpenter	Forward	Boston College
Ann-Renee Desbiens	Goaltender	Wisconsin
Shelby Amsley-Benzie	Goaltender	North Dakota
Hannah Brandt	Forward	Minnesota
Dani Cameranesi	Forward	Minnesota
Megan Keller	Defense	Boston College
Kelsey Koelzer	Defense	Princeton
Annie Pankowski	Forward	Wisconsin
Haley Skarupa	Forward	Boston College

=== AHCA Coach of the Year ===
AHCA Coach of the Year Finalists
Coach	School
Katie King-Crowley	Boston College
Matt Desrosiers	Clarkson
Michael Sisti	Mercyhurst
Brad Frost	Minnesota
Mark Johnson	Wisconsin
Jeff Kampersal	Princeton
