= 2015–16 Northeastern Huskies women's ice hockey season =

Quarterfinal, Lost to Boston College, 1-5
- Conference: 2nd WHEA
- Home ice: Matthews Arena

Rankings
- USA Today/USA Hockey Magazine: 6
- USCHO.com: 6

Record
- Overall: 28–9–1
- Home: 17–2–0
- Road: 11–5–0
- Neutral: 0–2–0

Coaches and captains
- Head coach: Dave Flint
- Assistant coaches: Jeff Pellegrini; Nick Carpenito
- Captain: Kendall Coyne
- Alternate captain(s): Tori Hickel; Melissa Haganey; Sarah Foss

The Northeastern Huskies represented Northeastern University in the Women's Hockey East Association during the 2015–16 NCAA Division I women's ice hockey season. The squad was captained by Patty Kazmaier Award winner Kendall Coyne.

== Recruiting ==
Player	Position	Nationality	Notes
Morgan Crane	Forward	United States	Played for the Chicago Young Americans
Adrieana Rossini	Forward	United States	Played for Arlington Catholic HS
Maddie Hartman	Defense	United States	Played for the Chicago Young Americans
Brianna Storms	Goalie	United States	Played for Moorhead (MN) High School
Kasidy Anderson	Forward	United States	Shaker Heights (OH) High School
Brittany Bugalski	Goalie	United States	Played for USA National U18 Team

== Roster ==
=== 2015–16 Huskies ===
No.	Nat.	Player	Class	Pos	Height	DoB	Hometown	Previous team
2		Lauren Kelly	Sophomore	D	5' 6" (1.68 m)		Watertown, Massachusetts	Winchendon School
3		Morgan Crane	Freshman	F	5' 10" (1.78 m)		Northfield, Illinois	Chicago Young Americans
5		Halle Silva	Sophomore	F	5' 0" (1.52 m)		Acushnet, Massachusetts	Tabor Academy
6		Shelby Herrington	Sophomore	D	6' 1" (1.85 m)		Bow, New Hampshire	Bishop Brady
7		McKenna Brand	Sophomore	F	5' 6" (1.68 m)		Nevis, Minnesota	North American Hockey Academy
10		Audriana Rossini	Freshman	F	5' 6" (1.68 m)		Malden, Massachusetts	Arlington Catholic HS
11		Christina Zalewski	Sophomore	F	5' 4" (1.63 m)		Canonsburg, Pennsylvania	Williston Nothampton
13		Taytum Clairmont	Sophomore	F	5' 4" (1.63 m)		Waterloo, Ontario	Toronto Aeros
14		Hayley Scamurra	Junior	F	5' 8" (1.73 m)		Williamsville, New York	Oakville Jr. Hornets
15		Jordan Krause	Senior	D	5' 9" (1.75 m)		Kelowna, British Columbia	Minnesota Duluth (WCHA)
19		Mellissa Haganey (A)	Junior	F	5' 4" (1.63 m)		Franklin, Massachusetts	Loomis Chaffee
21		Sarah Foss (A)	Junior	G	5' 4" (1.63 m)		North Reading, Massachusetts	National Sports Academy
23		Hayley Masters	Junior	F	5' 8" (1.73 m)		Shanty Bay, Ontario	Mississauga Jr. Chiefs
26		Heather Mottau	Junior	D	5' 6" (1.68 m)		Milton, Massachusetts	Shattuck-St. Mary's
27		Maddie Hartman	Freshman	D	5' 7" (1.7 m)		Deer Park, Illinois	Chicago Young Americans
28		Paige Savage	Junior	F	5' 8" (1.73 m)		Johns Creek, Georgia	North American Hockey Academy
30		Brianna Storms	Freshman	G	5' 5" (1.65 m)		Sabin, Minnesota	Moorhead HS
37		Kasidy Anderson	Freshman	F	5' 10" (1.78 m)		Shaker Heights, Ohio	Shaker Heights HS
39		Brittany Bugalski	Freshman	G	5' 9" (1.75 m)		Boynton Beach, Florida	Team USA
41		Denisa Křížová	Sophomore	F	5' 5" (1.65 m)		Horni Cerekev, Czech Republic	National Sports Academy
55		Tori Hickel (A)	Senior	D	5' 4" (1.63 m)		Anchorage, Alaska	North American Hockey Academy
66		Ainsley MacMillan	Sophomore	D	5' 6" (1.68 m)		Ilderton, Ontario	Mississauga Jr. Chiefs
77		Kendall Coyne (C)	Senior	F	5' 4" (1.63 m)		Palos Heights, IL	Berkshire Academy

== Schedule ==
Date	Opponent^{#}	Rank^{#}	Site	Decision	Result	Record
Regular Season
September 26	at St. Lawrence*		Appleton Arena • Canton, NY	Brittany Bugalski	T 2–2 ^{OT}	0–0–1
September 27	at St. Lawrence*		Appleton Arena • Canton, NY	Brittany Bugalski	W 9–5	1–0–1
October 9	Syracuse*		Matthews Arena • Boston, MA	Sarah Foss	W 5–4	2–0–1
October 10	Lindenwood*		Matthews Arena • Boston, MA	Brittany Bugalski	L 2–4	2–1–1
October 16	Mercyhurst*		Matthews Arena • Boston, MA	Brittany Bugalski	W 5–4	3–1–1
October 17	Mercyhurst*		Matthews Arena • Boston, MA	Brittany Bugalski	W 7–3	4–1–1
October 24	Boston University	#10	Matthews Arena • Boston, MA	Brittany Bugalski	W 7–1	5–1–1 (1–0–0)
October 25	Providence	#10	Matthews Arena • Boston, MA	Brittany Bugalski	W 4–0	6–1–1 (2–0–0)
October 30	at Merrimack	#9	Volpe Complex • North Andover, MA	Brittany Bugalski	W 4–0	7–1–1 (3–0–0)
November 6	at Maine	#8	Alfond Arena • Orono, ME	Brittany Bugalski	W 3–1	8–1–1 (4–0–0)
November 13	at Merrimack	#7	Volpe Complex • North Andover, MA	Brittany Bugalski	W 8–3	9–1–1 (5–0–0)
November 14	Merrimack	#7	Matthews Arena • Boston, MA	Brittany Bugalski	W 6–0	10–1–1 (6–0–0)
November 20	at #2 Boston College	#5	Kelley Rink • Chestnut Hill, MA	Brittany Bugalski	L 2–4	10–2–1 (6–1–0)
November 21	Vermont	#5	Matthews Arena • Boston, MA	Brittany Bugalski	W 5–2	11–2–1 (7–1–0)
November 24	at #8 Harvard*	#4	Bright-Landry Hockey Center • Allston, MA	Brittany Bugalski	L 0–3	11–3–1
November 28	#2 Boston College	#4	Matthews Arena • Boston, MA	Sarah Foss	L 1–6	11–4–1 (7–2–0)
December 4	at Vermont	#8	Gutterson Fieldhouse • Burlington, VT	Sarah Foss	W 5–1	12–4–1 (8–2–0)
December 5	at Vermont	#8	Gutterson Fieldhouse • Burlington, VT	Sarah Foss	W 2–1	13–4–1 (9–2–0)
January 2, 2016	Dartmouth*	#7	Matthews Arena • Boston, MA	Sarah Foss	W 5–2	14–4–1
January 5	Connecticut	#8	Matthews Arena • Boston, MA	Brittany Bugalski	W 5–1	15–4–1 (10–2–0)
January 9	New Hampshire	#8	Matthews Arena • Boston, MA	Sarah Foss	W 4–2	16–4–1 (11–2–0)
January 10	at New Hampshire	#8	Whittemore Center • Durham, NH	Brittany Bugalski	W 5–2	17–4–1 (12–2–0)
January 13	at Providence	#7	Schneider Arena • Providence, RI	Sarah Foss	W 5–1	18–4–1 (13–2–0)
January 16	Maine	#7	Matthews Arena • Boston, MA	Brittany Bugalski	W 8–1	19–4–1 (14–2–0)
January 17	Maine	#7	Matthews Arena • Boston, MA	Sarah Foss	W 5–2	20–4–1 (15–2–0)
January 22	Connecticut	#6	Matthews Arena • Boston, MA	Brittany Bugalski	W 4–0	21–4–1 (16–2–0)
January 22	at Connecticut	#6	Freitas Ice Forum • Storrs, CT	Brittany Bugalski	W 7–3	22–4–1 (17–2–0)
January 29	at New Hampshire	#6	Matthews Arena • Boston, MA	Brittany Bugalski	W 5–2	23–4–1 (18–2–0)
February 2	at Boston University*	#5	Walter Brown Arena • Boston, MA (Beanot, Opening Round)	Brittany Bugalski	W 3–2	24–4–1
February 6	at Providence	#5	Schneider Arena • Providence, RI	Brittany Bugalski	W 3–1	25–4–1 (19–2–0)
February 10	vs. #1 Boston College*	#6	Walter Brown Arena • Boston, MA (Beanpot Championship)	Brittany Bugalski	L 0–7	25–5–1
February 12	at #1 Boston College	#6	Kelley Rink • Chestnut Hill, MA	Brittany Bugalski	L 3–5	25–6–1 (19–3–0)
February 19	at Boston University	#6	Walter Brown Arena • Boston, MA	Brittany Bugalski	L 2–3	25–7–1 (19–4–0)
February 20	Boston University	#6	Matthews Arena • Boston, MA	Brittany Bugalski	W 6–2	26–7–1 (20–4–0)
WHEA Tournament
February 26	Providence*	#6	Matthews Arena • Boston, MA (Quarterfinals, Game 1)	Sarah Foss	W 5–2	27–7–1
February 27	Providence*	#6	Matthews Arena • Boston, MA (Quarterfinals, Game 2)	Brittany Bugalski	W 6–2	28–7–1
March 5	vs. Boston University*	#6	Volpe Complex • North Andover, MA (Semifinal Game)	Brittany Bugalski	L 3–4	28–8–1
NCAA Tournament
March 12	at #1 Boston College*	#6	Kelley Rink • Boston, MA (Quarterfinal Game)	Brittany Bugalski	L 1–5	28–9–1
*Non-conference game. ^{#}Rankings from USCHO.com Poll.

== Awards and honors ==
- Kendall Coyne named to NCAA 2016 Top 10 Athletes (all sports).
- Kendall Coyne named 2016 Best Female Athlete in 'Globies' award from the Boston Globe
- Kendall Coyne named Patty Kazmaier Award winner as best NCAA women's hockey player in the nation for 2015–16.
- Kendall Coyne wins Cammi Granato Award as top player in the WHEA.
- Records set by Kendall Coyne: Northeasterns all-time leading goal-scorer (141) and point scorer (249); WHEA season record for goals (50) and points (55).
- Kendall Coyne (USA), Denisa Křížová (Czech Rep.) and Lucie Povova(Czech Rep.), named to World Championship national teams

=== WHEA All-Star Team Honors ===
- Kendall Coyne, F - First Team
- Brittany Bugalski, G - Second Team & Rookie Team
- Jordan Krause, D - Second Team
- Denisa Křížová, F - Second Team
- Heather Mottau, D - Honorable Mention
- Maddie Hartman, D - Rookie Team
