= 2015–16 Maine Black Bears women's ice hockey season =

2015-2016 Maine Black Bears women's ice hockey season

- Conference: 8th WHEA
- Home ice: Alfond Arena

Record
- Overall: 10-23-2
- Home: 5-10-2
- Road: 4-13-0
- Neutral: 1-0-0

Coaches and captains
- Head coach: Richard Reichenbach
- Assistant coaches: Sara Reichenbach

The Maine Black Bears represented University of Maine in Women's Hockey East Association during the 2015–16 NCAA Division I women's ice hockey season.

== Offseason ==
- July 1: The Maine Black Bears led Women's Hockey East with 19 named to the WHEA All-Academic All-Star Team.

=== Recruiting ===
Player	Position	Nationality	Notes
Carly Jackson	Goalie	Canada	Cumberland County Blues Jr. B (Male)
Lydia Murray	Forward	Canada	Sault Ste. Marie Wildcats
Cailey Hutchison	Forward	United States	Northwood School
Nicole Arnold	Forward	United States	Madison Capitols
Estelle Duvin	Forward	France	French National Team
Alyson Matteau	Defense	Canada	Northwood School
Cassidy Herman	Defense	Canada	Ottawa Jr. Senators

== Roster ==
=== 2015-16 Black Bears ===
No.	Nat.	Player	Class	Pos	Height	DoB	Hometown	Previous team
3		Brooke Stacey	Sophomore	F	5' 10" (1.78 m)		Kahnawake, Quebec	Ontario Hockey Academy
4		Jessica Vallotton	Sophomore	D	6' 0" (1.83 m)		Glenboro, Manitoba	Westman Wildcats
7		Alyson Matteau	Freshman	D	5' 10" (1.78 m)		Mirabel, Quebec	Northwood School
8		Brooklyn Langlois	Senior	D	5' 6" (1.68 m)		Steinbach, Manitoba	Team Manitoba
9		Mikayla Rogers	Sophomore	D	5' 7" (1.7 m)		St. Paul, Minnesota	St. Paul Blades
10		Jillian Langtry	Senior	F	5' 2" (1.57 m)		Fort Frances, Ontario	Thunder Bay Queens
11		Victoria Hummel	Sophomore	F	5' 3" (1.6 m)		Tulln, Austria	EHV Sabers
12		Emilie Brigham	Junior	F	5' 5" (1.65 m)		Anoka, Minnesota	Anoka High School
13		Cailey Hutchison	Freshman	F	5' 4" (1.63 m)		Hicksville, New York	Northwood School
15		Catherine Tufts	Sophomore	F	5' 6" (1.68 m)		Church Point, Nova Scotia	Ontario Hockey Academy
16		Kelsey Macsorely	Senior	R	5' 6" (1.68 m)		Stratford, Ontario	St. Michael CSS
17		Lydia Murray	Freshman	F	5' 10" (1.78 m)		Sault Ste. Marie, Ontario	Sault Ste. Marie Wildcats
18		Cassidy Herman	Freshman	F	5' 6" (1.68 m)		Ottawa, Ontario	Ottawa Jr. Senators
19		Eve Boissonneault	Junior	F	5' 6" (1.68 m)		Sudbury, Ontario
20		Morgan Sakundiak	Junior	F	5' 4" (1.63 m)		Calgary, Alberta	Pursuit of Excellence
21		Audra Richards	Senior	F	5' 8" (1.73 m)		Maplewood, Minnesota	Tartan High School
23		Anna Wright	Sophomore	D	5' 11" (1.8 m)		North Berwick, Maine	Berwick Academy
24		Estelle Duvin	Freshman	F	5' 7" (1.7 m)		Coudekerque-Branche, France	French National Team
25		Nicole Arnold	Freshman	F	5' 8" (1.73 m)		St. Louis, Missouri	Madison Capitols
26		Abbey Cook	Senior	F	5' 5" (1.65 m)		Fairport, New York	Fairport HS
27		Mariah Fujimagari	Junior	G	5' 10" (1.78 m)		Markham, Ontario	Markham-Stoufville Stars
29		Kristin Gilmore	Junior	D	5' 10" (1.78 m)		Millgrove, Ontario	Oakville Hornets
30		Natalie Robinson	Senior	G	5' 8" (1.73 m)		Huntsville, Ontario	Huron Heights
31		Meghann Treacy	Senior	G	5' 9" (1.75 m)		Lake Peekskill, New York	Williston Northhampton
31		Carly Jackson	Freshman	G	5' 5" (1.65 m)		Amherst, Nova Scotia	Cumberland County Blues Jr. B

== Schedule ==
Date	Opponent^{#}	Rank^{#}	Site	Decision	Result	Record
Regular Season
October 2	at New Hampshire		Whittemore Center • Durham, NH	Meghann Treacy	W 4–0	1–0–0 (1–0–0)
October 4	#8 Boston University		Alfond Arena • Orono, ME	Meghann Treacy	L 2–4	1–1–0 (1–1–0)
October 9	#8 Quinnipiac*		Alfond Arena • Orono, ME	Meghann Treacy	L 1–3	1–2–0
October 10	#8 Quinnipiac*		Alfond Arena • Orono, ME	Meghann Treacy	L 1–5	1–3–0
October 17	at #2 Boston College		Kelley Rink • Chestnut Hill, MA	Meghann Treacy	L 0–4	1–4–0 (1–2–0)
October 18	at Merrimack		Volpe Complex • North Andover, MA	Meghann Treacy	W 2–1	2–4–0 (2–2–0)
October 23	vs. Brown*		Norway Savings Bank Arena • Auburn, ME	Meghann Treacy	W 4–0	3–4–0
October 24	Brown*		Alfond Arena • Orono, ME	Meghann Treacy	W 4–1	4–4–0
October 30	Providence		Alfond Arena • Orono, ME	NA	W 2–1 ^{OT}	5–4–0 (3–2–0)
November 1	at Vermont		Gutterson Fieldhouse • Burlington, VT	Meghann Treacy	L 2–4	5–5–0 (3–3–0)
November 6	#8 Northeastern		Alfond Arena • Orono, ME	Meghann Treacy	L 1–3	5–6–0 (3–4–0)
November 10	at Dartmouth*		Thompson Arena • Hanover, NH	Mariah Fujimagari	W 4–1	6–6–0
November 14	at Boston University		Walter Brown Arena • Boston, MA	Meghann Treacy	L 3–5	6–7–0 (3–5–0)
November 15	at Boston University		Walter Brown Arena • Boston, MA	Meghann Treacy	L 2–3	6–8–0 (3–6–0)
November 22	Connecticut		Alfond Arena • Orono, ME	Meghann Treacy	L 0–2	6–9–0 (3–7–0)
November 27	at Robert Morris*		RMU Island Sports Center • Neville Township, PA	Mariah Fujimagari	L 1–5	6–10–0
November 28	at Robert Morris*		RMU Island Sports Center • Neville Township, PA	Meghann Treacy	L 0–3	6–11–0
December 5	#2 Boston College		Alfond Arena • Orono, ME	Meghann Treacy	L 0–5	6–12–0 (3–8–0)
December 6	#2 Boston College		Alfond Arena • Orono, ME	Mariah Fujimagari	L 2–7	6–13–0 (3–9–0)
December 11	Union*		Alfond Arena • Orono, ME	Meghann Treacy	W 1–0	7–13–0
December 12	Union*		Alfond Arena • Orono, ME	Meghann Treacy	T 2–2 ^{OT}	7–13–1
January 9, 2016	Vermont		Alfond Arena • Orono, ME	Meghann Treacy	T 3–3 ^{OT}	7–13–2 (3–9–1)
January 10	Vermont		Alfond Arena • Orono, ME	Meghann Treacy	L 1–4	7–14–2 (3–10–1)
January 16	at #7 Northeastern		Matthews Arena • Boston, MA	Meghann Treacy	L 1–8	7–15–2 (3–11–1)
January 17	at #7 Northeastern		Matthews Arena • Boston, MA	Mariah Fujimagari	L 2–5	7–16–2 (3–12–1)
January 23	New Hampshire		Alfond Arena • Orono, ME	Meghann Treacy	L 1–5	7–17–2 (3–13–1)
January 24	New Hampshire		Alfond Arena • Orono, ME	Meghann Treacy	L 0–3	7–18–2 (3–14–1)
January 30	at Providence		Schneider Arena • Providence, RI	Meghann Treacy	W 3–1	8–18–2 (4–14–1)
January 31	at Providence		Schneider Arena • Providence, RI	Meghann Treacy	L 0–1	8–19–2 (4–15–1)
February 6	Merrimack		Alfond Arena • Orono, ME	Meghann Treacy	W 4–0	9–19–2 (5–15–1)
February 7	Merrimack		Alfond Arena • Orono, ME	Meghann Treacy	W 1–0	10–19–2 (6–15–1)
February 12	at Connecticut		Freitas Ice Forum • Storrs, CT	Meghann Treacy	L 1–2 ^{OT}	10–20–2 (6–16–1)
February 13	at Connecticut		Freitas Ice Forum • Storrs, CT	Meghann Treacy	L 3–4	10–21–2 (6–17–1)
WHEA Tournament
February 26	at #1 Boston College*		Kelley Rink • Chestnut Hill, MA (Quarterfinal Round, Game 1)	Meghann Treacy	L 2–5	10–22–2
February 27	at #1 Boston College*		Kelley Rink • Chestnut Hill, MA (Quarterfinal Round, Game 2)	Meghann Treacy	L 1–5	10–23–2
*Non-conference game. ^{#}Rankings from USCHO.com Poll.

== Awards and honors ==
- Alyson Matteau named to WHEA All-Rookie Team
