= 2015–16 Providence Friars women's ice hockey season =

2015 Mayor's Cup Winner
- Conference: 7th WHEA
- Home ice: Schneider Arena

Record
- Overall: 10-24-2
- Home: 7-9-2
- Road: 3-13-0
- Neutral: 0-2-0

Coaches and captains
- Head coach: Bob Deraney
- Assistant coaches: Melanie Ruzzi; Derek Alfama
- Captain: Lexi Romanchuk
- Alternate captain(s): Courtney Kukowski, Brittany Thunstrom, Lauren Klein

The Providence Friars represented Providence College in Women's Hockey East Association play during the 2015–16 NCAA Division I women's ice hockey season.

== Offseason ==
- July 1: 13 Players named to WHEA All Scholastic Team

=== Recruiting ===
Player	Position	Nationality	Notes
Madison Myers	Goaltender	United States	Played with Rice Memorial HS (VT)
Kate Friesen	Defense	Canada	Played with Pembina Valley Hawks
Emily Landry	Forward	Canada	Played with Etobicoke Jr. Dolphins
Cassidy MacPherson	Forward	Canada	Played with Oakville Jr. Hornets
Christina Putigna	Forward	Canada	Played with Oakville Jr. Hornets
Danielle Hardy	Forward	Canada	Played with Pursuit of Excellence Academy
Nastasia Burzynski	Forward	United States	Played with East Coast Wizards

== Roster ==
=== 2015–16 Friars ===
No.	Nat.	Player	Class	Pos	Height	DoB	Hometown	Previous team
1		Madison Myers	Freshman	G	5' 7" (1.7 m)		Colchester, Vermont	Rice Memorial HS
2		Ariana Buxman	Junior	D	5' 6" (1.68 m)		Glenwood Springs, Colorado	Shattuck St. Mary's
4		Blair Parent	Sophomore	F	5' 5" (1.65 m)		Blaine, Minnesota	Anoka HS
5		Courtney Kukowski (A)	Senior	F	5' 7" (1.7 m)		Apple Valley, Minnesota	Eastview HS
6		Kate Friesen	Freshman	D	5' 6" (1.68 m)		Altona, Manitoba	Pembina Valley Hawks
8		Lexi Romanchuk (C)	Senior	D	5' 6" (1.68 m)		San Jose, California	San Jose Jr. Sharks
13		Emily Landry	Freshman	F	5' 8" (1.73 m)		Orangeville, Ontario	Etobicoke Jr. Dolphins
16		Brittney Thunstrom (A)	Senior	F	5' 9" (1.75 m)		Coon Rapids, Minnesota	Blaine HS
17		Cassidy MacPherson	Freshman	F	5' 6" (1.68 m)		Oakville, Ontario	Oakville Jr. Hornets
18		Ariana Reed	Junior	D	5' 3" (1.6 m)		Lakeville, Minnesota	Lakeville South HS
19		Brooke Boquist	Sophomore	F	5' 4" (1.63 m)		Thunder Bay, Ontario	Shattuck-St. Mary's
21		Christina Putigna	Freshman	F	5' 8" (1.73 m)		Grimsby, Ontario	Oakville Jr. Hornets
22		Kendra Goodrich	Junior	D	5' 9" (1.75 m)		Apple Valley, Minnesota	Rosemount HS
23		Madison Sansone	Sophomore	F	5' 3" (1.6 m)		Lockport, New York	Buffalo Bisons
24		Lauren Klein (A)	Junior	D	5' 5" (1.65 m)		Shoreview, Minnesota	RIT
26		Danielle Hardy	Freshman	F	6' 0" (1.83 m)		Nanaimo, British Columbia	Pursuit of Excellence Academy
27		Sarah Bryant	Senior	G	5' 8" (1.73 m)		Bethlehem, Pennsylvania	New Jersey Colonials
28		Natasia Burzynski	Freshman	F	5' 4" (1.63 m)		Rye, New Hampshire	East Coast Wizards
29		Cassidy Carels	Junior	F	5' 5" (1.65 m)		Bruxelles, Manitoba	Team Canada U18
31		Allie Morse	Senior	G	5' 6" (1.68 m)		Cottage Grove, Minnesota	Park HS
33		Alanna Serviss	Junior	G	5' 7" (1.7 m)		Chicago, Illinois	Chicago Young Americans

== Schedule ==
Date	Opponent^{#}	Rank^{#}	Site	Decision	Result	Record
Regular Season
October 2	vs. #3 Wisconsin*		Shark Ice • San Jose, CA	Sarah Bryant	L 1–5	0–1–0
October 3	vs. #3 Wisconsin*		Shark Ice • San Jose, CA	Sarah Bryant	L 1–8	0–2–0
October 17	Colgate*		Schneider Arena • Providence, RI	Sarah Bryant	L 2–6	0–3–0
October 18	Syracuse*		Schneider Arena • Providence, RI	Madison Myers	L 0–4	0–4–0
October 24	Vermont		Schneider Arena • Providence, RI	Madison Myers	L 1–3	0–5–0 (0–1–0)
October 25	at #9 Northeastern		Matthews Arena • Boston, MA	Allie Morse	L 0–4	0–6–0 (0–2–0)
October 30	at Maine		Alfond Arena • Orono, ME	Madison Myers	L 1–2 ^{OT}	0–7–0 (0–3–0)
November 7	New Hampshire		Schneider Arena • Providence, RI	Madison Myers	W 5–4	1–7–0 (1–3–0)
November 13	at Vermont		Gutterson Fieldhouse • Burlington, VT	Alanna Serviss	W 4–1	2–7–0 (2–3–0)
November 14	at Vermont		Gutterson Fieldhouse • Burlington, VT	Madison Myers	L 4–1	2–8–0 (2–4–0)
November 21	at New Hampshire		Whittemore Center • Durham, NH	Madison Myers	L 2–3	2–9–0 (2–5–0)
November 21	at New Hampshire		Whittemore Center • Durham, NH	Madison Myers	W 4–1	3–9–0 (3–5–0)
November 25	at #2 Boston College		Kelley Rink • Chestnut Hill, MA	Madison Myers	L 1–9	3–10–0 (3–6–0)
November 28	Brown*		Schneider Arena • Providence, RI (Mayor's Cup)	Madison Myers	W 6–1	4–10–0
December 1	Union*		Schneider Arena • Providence, RI	Madison Myers	W 5–1	5–10–0
December 9	Boston University		Schneider Arena • Providence, RI	Madison Myers	L 0–6	5–11–0 (3–7–0)
December 11	Merrimack		Schneider Arena • Providence, RI	Madison Myers	W 4–3	6–11–0 (4–7–0)
January 2, 2016	at Robert Morris*		RMU Island Sports Center • Neville Township, PA	Madison Myers	L 1–6	6–12–0
January 3	at Robert Morris*		RMU Island Sports Center • Neville Township, PA	Madison Myers	L 1–4	6–13–0
January 8	RIT*		Schneider Arena • Providence, RI	Madison Myers	W 5–1	7–13–0
January 9	RIT*		Schneider Arena • Providence, RI	Madison Myers	W 3–1	8–13–0
January 13	#7 Northeastern		Schneider Arena • Providence, RI	Madison Myers	L 1–5	8–14–0 (4–8–0)
January 16	Connecticut		Schneider Arena • Providence, RI	Madison Myers	T 1–1 ^{OT}	8–14–1 (4–8–1)
January 17	at Connecticut		Freitas Ice Forum • Storrs, CT	Madison Myers	L 2–5	8–15–1 (4–9–1)
January 23	at Boston University		Walter Brown Arena • Boston, MA	Allie Morse	L 1–5	8–16–1 (4–10–1)
January 24	Boston University		Schneider Arena • Providence, RI	Sarah Bryant	L 2–4	8–17–1 (4–11–1)
January 30	Maine		Schneider Arena • Providence, RI	Madison Myers	L 1–3	8–18–1 (4–12–1)
January 31	Maine		Schneider Arena • Providence, RI	Madison Myers	W 1–0	9–18–1 (5–12–1)
February 6	#5 Northeastern		Schneider Arena • Providence, RI	Madison Myers	L 1–3	9–19–1 (5–13–1)
February 7	at Connecticut		Freitas Ice Forum • Storrs, CT	Sarah Bryant	L 1–3	9–20–1 (5–14–1)
February 13	at Merrimack		Volpe Complex • North Andover, MA	Madison Myers	W 4–1	10–20–1 (6–14–1)
February 14	Merrimack		Schneider Arena • Providence, RI	Madison Myers	T 2–2 ^{OT}	10–20–2 (6–14–2)
February 19	at #1 Boston College		Kelley Rink • Chestnut Hill, MA	Sarah Bryant	L 1–7	10–21–2 (6–15–2)
February 20	#1 Boston College		Schneider Arena • Providence, RI	Sarah Bryant	L 1–9	10–22–2 (6–16–2)
WHEA Tournament
February 26	at #6 Northeastern*		Matthews Arena • Boston, MA (Quarterfinal, Game 1)	Madison Myers	L 2–5	10–23–2
February 27	at #6 Northeastern*		Matthews Arena • Boston, MA (Quarterfinal, Game 2)	Madison Myers	L 2–6	10–24–2
*Non-conference game. ^{#}Rankings from USCHO.com Poll.

== Awards and honors ==
- Christina Putigna was named to the 2016 Hockey East Pro Ambitions All-Rookie Team
