= 2015–16 UConn Huskies women's ice hockey season =

2015–16 Connecticut Huskies women's ice hockey season
- Conference: 4th WHEA
- Home ice: Freitas Ice Forum

Record
- Overall: 17–15–5
- Home: 9–5–4
- Road: 7–8–1
- Neutral: 1–2–0

Coaches and captains
- Head coach: Chris MacKenzie
- Assistant coaches: Jaclyn Hawkins; Casey Handrahan
- Captain(s): Caitlin Hewes; Leah Buress

The UConn Huskies women's ice hockey program represented the University of Connecticut Huskies during the 2015–16 NCAA Division I women's ice hockey season.

== Offseason ==
- April 23: Elaine Chuli was chosen to participate in the Team Canada Development Team Strength and Conditioning camp.

=== Recruiting ===
Player	Position	Nationality	Notes
Jaime Fox	Defense	Canada	Played for Unionville HS
Rebecca Lindblad	Forward	United States	Played for New Trier HS
Nora Maclaine	Forward	United States	Played for Oliver Ames HS
Kayla Mee	Defense	Canada	Played for Shaftesbury Prep
Nicki Mueller	Goaltender	United States	Played for Huntley HS

== Roster ==
=== 2015–16 Huskies ===
No.	Nat.	Player	Class	Pos	Height	DoB	Hometown	Previous team
3		Theresa Knutson	Sophomore	F	5' 6" (1.68 m)		Onalaska, Wisconsin	Team Wisconsin
4		Cyndee Cook	Sophomore	D	5' 4" (1.63 m)		Winnipeg, Manitoba	Shaftesbury Prep
5		Lexi Lersch	Junior	D	5' 7" (1.7 m)		Manhattan Beach, California	Choate Rosemary Hall
6		Norah Maclaine	Freshman	F	5' 8" (1.73 m)		Easton, Massachusetts	Oliver Ames HS
7		Leah Lum	Sophomore	D	5' 5" (1.65 m)		Richmond, British Columbia	Pacific Steelers
8		Rebecca Lindblad	Freshman	F	5' 8" (1.73 m)		Winnetka, Illinois	New Trier HS
9		Jessica Stott	Junior	D	5' 6" (1.68 m)		Niverville, Manitoba	Shaftesbury Prep
10		Lindsay Roethke	Sophomore	F	5' 1" (1.55 m)		Buffalo, Minnesota	Buffalo HS
11		Brittany Berisoff	Senior	F	5' 7" (1.7 m)		Kelowna, British Columbia	Notre Dame
12		Cassandra Opela	Senior	D	5' 8" (1.73 m)		Penfield, New York	Boston Shamrocks
13		Reese Maccario	Sophomore	F	5' 3" (1.6 m)		Marblehead, Massachusetts	Boston Shamrocks
14		Justine Fredette	Sophomore	F	5' 5" (1.65 m)		Winnipeg, Manitoba	Shaftesbury Prep
16		Allie Hughes	Senior	D	5' 5" (1.65 m)		La Canada, California	Brewster Academy
17		Caitlin Hewes (C)	Senior (RS)	D	5' 7" (1.7 m)		Stillwater, Minnesota	Stillwater Area HS
19		Margaret Zimmer	Senior	F	5' 7" (1.7 m)		St. Charles, Illinois	Chicago Mission
22		Kelly Harris	Junior	F	5' 7" (1.7 m)		Canton, Michigan	Little Caesar
28		Kayla Mee	Freshman	D	5' 11" (1.8 m)		Winnipeg, Manitoba	Shaftesbury Prep
29		Elaine Chuli	Senior	G	5' 7" (1.7 m)		Waterton, Ontario	Team Canada U18
31		Nicki Mueller	Freshman	G	5' 9" (1.75 m)		Huntley, Illinois	Huntley HS
41		Annie Belanger	Sophomore	G	5' 9" (1.75 m)		Sherbrooke, Quebec	Team Quebec U18
47		Jaime Fox	Freshman	D	5' 10" (1.78 m)		Unionville, Ontario	Unionville HS
91		Madison Badeau	Sophomore	F	6' 0" (1.83 m)		Courtice, Ontario	Jr. Wolves Intermediate
94		Leah Buress (C)	Senior	F	5' 4" (1.63 m)		Windsor, Ontario	Bluewater Intermediate

== Schedule ==
Date	Opponent^{#}	Rank^{#}	Site	Decision	Result	Record
Regular Season
October 2	at #8 Boston University		Walter Brown Arena • Boston, MA	Elaine Chuli	L 1–2	0–1–0 (0–1–0)
October 3	Union*		Freitas Ice Forum • Storrs, CT	Annie Belanger	T 2–2 ^{OT}	0–1–1
October 17	Syracuse*		Freitas Ice Forum • Storrs, CT	Annie Belanger	W 4–3	1–1–1
October 18	Colgate*		Freitas Ice Forum • Storrs, CT	Elaine Chuli	T 3–3 ^{OT}	1–1–2
October 24	at Penn State*		Pegula Ice Arena • University Park, PA	Annie Belanger	W 1–0	2–1–2
October 25	at Penn State*		Pegula Ice Arena • University Park, PA	Elaine Chuli	W 4–3	3–1–2
October 30	at #2 Boston College		Kelley Rink • Chestnut Hill, MA	Elaine Chuli	L 0–4	3–2–2 (0–2–0)
October 31	#2 Boston College		Freitas Ice Forum • Storrs, CT	Elaine Chuli	L 0–4	3–3–2 (0–3–0)
November 7	Merrimack		Freitas Ice Forum • Storrs, CT	Elaine Chuli	W 1–0	4–3–2 (1–3–0)
November 8	New Hampshire		Freitas Ice Forum • Storrs, CT	Elaine Chuli	L 1–2	4–4–2 (1–4–0)
November 13	at #4 Clarkson*		Cheel Arena • Potsdam, NY	Annie Belanger	L 1–3	4–5–2
November 14	at #4 Clarkson*		Cheel Arena • Potsdam, NY	Elaine Chuli	L 2–3	4–6–2
November 20	Vermont		Freitas Ice Forum • Storrs, CT	Annie Belanger	W 3–2	5–6–2 (2–4–0)
November 22	at Maine		Alfond Arena • Orono, ME	Elaine Chuli	W 2–0	6–6–2 (3–4–0)
November 27	vs. #5 Quinnipiac*		Ingalls Rink • New Haven, CT (Nutmeg Classic, Opening Round)	Annie Belanger	L 0–1	6–7–2
November 28	vs. Merrimack*		Ingalls Rink • New Haven, CT (Nutmeg Classic, Consolation Game)	Elaine Chuli	W 4–1	7–7–2
December 5	Boston University		Freitas Ice Forum • Storrs, CT	Annie Belanger	T 4–4 ^{OT}	7–7–3 (3–4–1)
December 6	at Boston University		Walter Brown Arena • Boston, MA	Elaine Chuli	L 3–4	7–8–3 (3–5–1)
January 5, 2016	at #8 Northeastern		Matthews Arena • Boston, MA	Annie Belanger	L 1–5	7–9–3 (3–6–1)
January 9	at Merrimack		Volpe Complex • North Andover, MA	Annie Belanger	W 4–3	8–9–3 (4–6–1)
January 10	Merrimack		Freitas Ice Forum • Storrs, CT	Annie Belanger	T 2–2 ^{OT}	8–9–4 (4–6–2)
January 16	at Providence		Schneider Arena • Providence, RI	Elaine Chuli	T 1–1 ^{OT}	8–9–5 (4–6–3)
January 17	Providence		Freitas Ice Forum • Storrs, CT	Elaine Chuli	W 5–2	9–9–5 (5–6–3)
January 22	at #6 Northeastern		Matthews Arena • Boston, MA	Elaine Chuli	L 0–4	9–10–5 (5–7–3)
January 23	#6 Northeastern		Freitas Ice Forum • Storrs, CT	Elaine Chuli	L 3–7	9–11–5 (5–8–3)
January 25	#9 Princeton*		Freitas Ice Forum • Storrs, CT	Annie Belanger	L 0–4	9–12–5
January 29	at Vermont		Gutterson Fieldhouse • Burlington, VT	Elaine Chuli	W 2–1	10–12–5 (6–8–3)
January 30	at Vermont		Gutterson Fieldhouse • Burlington, VT	Elaine Chuli	W 3–1	11–12–5 (7–8–3)
February 6	#1 Boston College		Freitas Ice Forum • Storrs, CT	Elaine Chuli	L 4–5	11–13–5 (7–9–3)
February 7	Providence		Freitas Ice Forum • Storrs, CT	Elaine Chuli	W 3–1	12–13–5 (8–9–3)
February 12	Maine		Freitas Ice Forum • Storrs, CT	Elaine Chuli	W 2–1 ^{OT}	13–13–5 (9–9–3)
February 13	Maine		Freitas Ice Forum • Storrs, CT	Elaine Chuli	W 4–3	14–13–5 (10–9–3)
February 20	at New Hampshire		Whittemore Center • Durham, NH	Elaine Chuli	L 1–2	14–14–5 (10–10–3)
February 21	at New Hampshire		Whittemore Center • Durham, NH	Elaine Chuli	W 2–1 ^{OT}	15–14–5 (11–10–3)
WHEA Tournament
February 26	New Hampshire*		Freitas Ice Forum • Storrs, CT (Quarterfinals, Game 1)	Elaine Chuli	W 3–2	16–14–5
February 27	New Hampshire*		Freitas Ice Forum • Storrs, CT (Quarterfinals, Game 2)	Elaine Chuli	W 4–3 ^{3OT}	17–14–5
March 5	vs. #1 Boston College*		Volpe Complex • North Andover, MA (Semifinal Game)	Elaine Chuli	L 2–4	17–15–5
*Non-conference game. ^{#}Rankings from USCHO.com Poll.

== Awards and honors ==
- Goaltender Elaine Chuli named to All American Second Team All Stars. She became the all-time leading saves leader in WHEA History. She was also named to the WHEA First All-Star Team, as the leagues leading Goaltender.
- Defender Alyson Matteau was named to the WHEA's Rookie All-Star Team.
- Forward Leah Burress was named WHEA's Best Defensive Forward.

== Sources ==
- 2016-17 UConn Women's Ice Hockey Media Guide (PDF). Storrs, CT: University of Connecticut. 2016. Archived from the original (PDF) on February 25, 2017.
