= 2015–16 Robert Morris Colonials women's ice hockey season =

- Conference: 4th College Hockey America
- Home ice: RMU Island Sports Center

Record
- Overall: 17–16–5
- Conference: 7-9-4
- Home: 12–6–1
- Road: 5–9–4
- Neutral: 0–1–0

Coaches and captains
- Head coach: Paul Colontino (5th season)
- Assistant coaches: Logan Bittle; Chelsea Walkland
- Captain: Ashley Vesci
- Alternate captain(s): Rikki Meilleur, Leah Carlson

The Robert Morris Colonials women represented Robert Morris University in CHA women's ice hockey during the 2015–16 NCAA Division I women's ice hockey season. The Colonials finished conference play in fourth place, and were eliminated in the semifinal of the CHA Tournament by Mercyhurst.

== Offseason ==
- July 1: 2011 Graduate Brianne McLaughlin signs as goaltender for Buffalo Beauts of the NWHL.

=== Recruiting ===
Player	Position	Nationality	Notes
Kirsten Welsh	Defender	Canada	Blueliner for the Whitby Jr. Wolves
Victoria Harshman	Forward	Canada	Competed with the Etobicoke Jr. Dolphins
Sarah Quaranta	Forward	Canada	Niagara Falls native played for Stoney Creek Sabres
Maggie LaGue	Defender	United States	Attended North American Hockey Academy
Caitlyn Sadowsky	Forward	Canada	Skated for the Mississauga Jr. Chiefs
Amber Rennie	Forward	Canada	With Saskatchewan's Notre Dame Hounds
Lauren Bailey	Goaltender	United States	Attended Choate-Rosemary Hall

== Standings ==
2015–16 College Hockey America standings
	Conference							Overall					
	GP	W	L	T	PTS	GF	GA	GP	W	L	T	GF	GA
Mercyhurst†*	20	14	3	3	31	55	26	35	19	11	5	92	74
Syracuse	20	14	4	2	30	56	28	36	19	14	3	96	77
Penn State	20	6	8	6	18	33	35	37	12	19	6	65	76
Robert Morris	20	7	9	4	18	52	57	38	17	16	9	108	97
Lindenwood	20	5	11	4	14	31	46	37	9	24	4	64	102
RIT	20	4	15	1	9	25	60	36	8	27	1	51	108
Championship: Mercyhurst † indicates conference regular season champion * indicates conference tournament champion Current rankings: USCHO.com Division I women's poll

- Rankings based on number of wins in the conference

== Roster ==
=== 2015–16 Colonials ===
No.	Nat.	Player	Class	Pos	Height	DoB	Hometown	Previous team
1		Jessica Dodds	Junior	G	5' 7" (1.7 m)		London, Ontario	London Jr. Devilettes
2		Leah Carlson (A)	Senior	D	5' 8" (1.73 m)		Copper Center, Alaska	Kenny Lake
3		Brittany Howard	Sophomore (RS)	F	5' 4" (1.63 m)		St. Thomas, Ontario	London Jr. Devilettes
4		Kirsten Welsh	Freshman	D	5' 11" (1.8 m)		Blackstock, Ontario	Whitby Jr. Wolves
7		Victoria Harshman	Freshman	F	5' 6" (1.68 m)		Owen Sound, Ontario	Etobicoke Jr. Dolphins
8		Sarah Quaranta	Freshman	F	5' 6" (1.68 m)		Niagara Falls, Ontario	Stoney Creek Jr. Sabres
9		Maggie LaGue	Freshman	D	5' 8" (1.73 m)		Barre, Vermont	North American Hockey Academy
10		Rikki Meilleur (A)	Junior	F	5' 5" (1.65 m)		St. Adolphe, Manitoba	Shaftesbury Titans
11		Natalie Fraser	Sophomore	D	5' 6" (1.68 m)		Ottawa, Ontario	Ottawa Jr. Lady Senators
12		Leah Carey	Sophomore	D	5' 9" (1.75 m)		Middleton, Wisconsin	Madison Capitols
14		Mikaela Lowater	Junior	D	5' 7" (1.7 m)		Thornhill, Ontario	Mississauga Jr. Chiefs
15		Maeve Garvey	Junior	F	5' 4" (1.63 m)		Oakville, Ontario	Burlington Jr. Barracudas
17		Anissa Gamble	Senior	F	5' 5" (1.65 m)		Fredericton, New Brunswick	Burlington Jr. Barracudas
18		Jessica Gazzola	Sophomore	F	5' 2" (1.57 m)		Thunder Bay, Ontario	Toronto Jr. Aeros
19		Katherine Murphy	Sophomore	F	5' 3" (1.6 m)		Cary, North Carolina	North American Hockey Academy
20		Caitlyn Sadowsy	Freshman	F	5' 6" (1.68 m)		Woodbridge, Ontario	Mississauga Jr. Chiefs
22		Ashley Vesci (C)	Senior	F	5' 5" (1.65 m)		Pittsburgh, Pennsylvania	Lawrence Academy(MA)
23		Amber Rennie	Freshman	F	5' 3" (1.6 m)		Saskatoon, Saskatchewan	Notre Dame Hounds
26		Mackenzie Johnston	Junior	F	5' 7" (1.7 m)		Barrie, Ontario	Etobicoke Jr. Dolphins
28		Amanda Pantaleo	Sophomore	F	5' 5" (1.65 m)		Markham, Ontario	Toronto Jr. Aeros
29		Lauren Bailey	Freshman	G	5' 9" (1.75 m)		Freeland, Michigan	Choate-Rosemary Hall
31		Elijah Milne-Price	Sophomore	G	5' 7" (1.7 m)		Mississauga, Ontario	Mississauga Jr. Chiefs

== Schedule ==
Date	Opponent^{#}	Rank^{#}	Site	Decision	Result	Record
Regular Season
September 25	at #9 Bemidji State*		Sanford Center • Bemidji, MN	Jessica Dodds	L 1–3	0–1–0
September 26	at #9 Bemidji State*		Sanford Center • Bemidji, MN	Lauren Bailey	T 4–4 ^{OT}	0–1–1
October 2	at Colgate*		Starr Rink • Hamilton, NY	Jessica Dodds	L 3–5	0–2–1
October 3	at Colgate*		Starr Rink • Hamilton, NY	Lauren Bailey	L 0–6	0–3–1
October 9	Merrimack*		RMU Island Sports Center • Neville Township, PA	Jessica Dodds	W 6–1	1–3–1
October 10	Merrimack*		RMU Island Sports Center • Neville Township, PA	Jessica Dodds	W 4–2	2–3–1
October 16	at Rensselaer*		Houston Field House • Troy, NY	Jessica Dodds	W 2–0	3–3–1
October 17	at Rensselaer*		Houston Field House • Troy, NY	Jessica Dodds	W 3–0	4–3–1
October 30	Syracuse		RMU Island Sports Center • Neville Township, PA	Jessica Dodds	L 3–4 ^{OT}	4–4–1 (0–1–0)
October 31	Syracuse		RMU Island Sports Center • Neville Township, PA	Jessica Dodds	W 2–0	5–4–1 (1–1–0)
November 6	at RIT		Gene Polisseni Center • Rochester, NY	Jessica Dodds	W 4–0	6–4–1 (2–1–0)
November 7	at RIT		Gene Polisseni Center • Rochester, NY	Jessica Dodds	W 6–3	7–4–1 (3–1–0)
November 13	Penn State		RMU Island Sports Center • Neville Township, PA	Jessica Dodds	T 2–2 ^{OT}	7–4–2 (3–1–1)
November 14	Penn State		RMU Island Sports Center • Neville Township, PA	Jessica Dodds	L 1–5	7–5–2 (3–2–1)
November 27	Maine*		RMU Island Sports Center • Neville Township, PA	Jessica Dodds	W 5–1	8–5–2
November 28	Maine*		RMU Island Sports Center • Neville Township, PA	Jessica Dodds	W 3–0	9–5–2
December 4	at Mercyhurst		Mercyhurst Ice Center • Erie, PA	Jessica Dodds	L 1–4	9–6–2 (3–3–1)
December 5	at Mercyhurst		Mercyhurst Ice Center • Erie, PA	Jessica Dodds	T 4–4 ^{OT}	9–6–3 (3–3–2)
December 12	at Lindenwood		Lindenwood Ice Arena • Wentzville, MO	Jessica Dodds	T 3–3 ^{OT}	9–6–4 (3–3–3)
December 13	at Lindenwood		Lindenwood Ice Arena • Wentzville, MO	Jessica Dodds	W 4–1	10–6–4 (4–3–3)
January 2, 2016	Providence*		RMU Island Sports Center • Neville Township, PA	Jessica Dodds	W 6–1	11–6–4
January 3	Providence*		RMU Island Sports Center • Neville Township, PA	Jessica Dodds	W 4–1	12–6–4
January 15	at #4 Quinnipiac*		TD Bank Sports Center • Hamden, CT	Jessica Dodds	L 2–3	12–7–4
January 16	at #4 Quinnipiac*		TD Bank Sports Center • Hamden, CT	Jessica Dodds	L 0–2	12–8–4
January 22	at Penn State		Pegula Ice Arena • University Park, PA	Jessica Dodds	L 2–3 ^{OT}	12–9–4 (4–4–3)
January 23	at Penn State		Pegula Ice Arena • University Park, PA	Jessica Dodds	T 2–2 ^{OT}	12–9–5 (4–4–4)
January 29	Lindenwood		RMU Island Sports Center • Neville Township, PA	Jessica Dodds	W 5–2	13–9–5 (5–4–4)
January 30	Lindenwood		RMU Island Sports Center • Neville Township, PA	Jessica Dodds	W 3–2 ^{OT}	14–9–5 (6–4–4)
February 5	Mercyhurst		RMU Island Sports Center • Neville Township, PA	Jessica Dodds	L 0–4	14–10–5 (6–5–4)
February 6	Mercyhurst		RMU Island Sports Center • Neville Township, PA	Lauren Bailey	L 3–6	14–11–5 (6–6–4)
February 12	Syracuse		RMU Island Sports Center • Neville Township, PA	Jessica Dodds	L 1–6	14–12–5 (6–7–4)
February 13	Syracuse		RMU Island Sports Center • Neville Township, PA	Jessica Dodds	L 2–3	14–13–5 (6–8–4)
February 19	RIT		RMU Island Sports Center • Neville Township, PA	Jessica Dodds	W 2–0	15–13–5 (7–8–4)
February 20	RIT		RMU Island Sports Center • Neville Township, PA	Jessica Dodds	W 2–3 ^{OT}	15–14–5 (7–9–4)
CHA Tournament
February 26	Lindenwood*		RMU Island Sports Center • Neville Township, PA (Quarterfinals, Game 1)	Jessica Dodds	L 3–4	15–15–5
February 27	Lindenwood*		RMU Island Sports Center • Neville Township, PA (Quarterfinals, Game 2)	Lauren Bailey	W 3–1	16–15–5
February 28	Lindenwood*		RMU Island Sports Center • Neville Township, PA (Quarterfinals, Game 3)	Lauren Bailey	W 5–1	17–15–5
March 4	vs. Mercyhurst*		Harborcenter • Buffalo, NY (Semifinal Game)	Lauren Bailey	L 2–4	17–16–5
*Non-conference game. ^{#}Rankings from USCHO.com Poll.

== Awards and honors ==
- Brittany Howard F, 2015–16 All-CHA First Team
- Mikaela Lowater D, 2015–16 All-CHA First Team
- Maggie LaGue D, 2015–16 All-CHA Rookie Team
- Sarah Quaranta F, 2015–16 All-CHA Rookie Team
