= Ashley Vesci =

American ice hockey player (born 1993)

- Born: July 12, 1993 (age 31); Pittsburgh, Pennsylvania, United States
- Height: 5 ft 7 in (170 cm)
- Position: Forward
- Shot: Right
- NWHL team: Buffalo Beauts
- National team: United States
- Playing career: 2016–2017

Ashley Vesci (born July 12, 1993) is an American ice hockey player. Vesci played professionally for the Buffalo Beauts of the National Women's Hockey League (NWHL) during the 2016/17 season.

== Personal life ==
Born and raised in Pittsburgh, PA where she currently resides.

== Career ==
During college, Vesci played four seasons for Robert Morris University in College Hockey America. Vesci captained the team in her senior year during the 2015/16 season.

=== NWHL ===
In August 2016, the Buffalo Beauts announced that Vesci was one of six players signed to practice player contracts for the team in their 2016/17 season. Vesci made her professional debut for the NWHL shortly after.

Vesci won the 2017 Isobel Cup with the Buffalo Beauts, with an assist on a goal by Emily Janiga during the playoffs. Vesci retired from professional ice hockey after the 2016/17 season.

== Career statistics ==
=== NCAA ===
Season	GP	G	A	Pts
2012-13 Robert Morris	26	0	1	1
2013-14 Robert Morris	35	6	8	14
2014-15 Robert Morris	35	6	5	11
2015-16 Robert Morris	35	13	10	23
NCAA Career	131	25	24	49

=== National Women's Hockey League (NWHL) ===
Season	GP	G	A	Pts
2016-17 Buffalo Beauts	10	0	1	1
2017 Buffalo Beauts Playoffs	2	0	1	1
