= 2015–16 Vermont Catamounts women's ice hockey season =

- Conference: 6th WHEA
- Home ice: Gutterson Fieldhouse

Record
- Overall: 9-25-3
- Home: 2-15-1
- Road: 7-10-2

Coaches and captains
- Head coach: Jim Plumer
- Assistant coaches: Kelly Nash
- Captain(s): Sarah Kelly; Gina Repaci

The Vermont Catamounts represented the University of Vermont in Women's Hockey East Association play during the 2015–16 NCAA Division I women's ice hockey season.

== Offseason ==
- July 1: 12 Players named to the WHEA All-Academic Team.

=== Recruiting ===
Player	Position	Nationality	Notes
Alyssa Gorecki	Forward	United States	US National U18 Team
Rachel Khalouf	Defense	United States	Pittsburgh Penguins Elite
Sammy Kolowrat	Defense	Czech Republic	Czech National Team
Daria O'Neill	Defense	Canada	Edge School
Saana Valkama	Forward	Finland	Finland National Team

== Roster ==
=== 2015–16 Catamounts ===
No.	Nat.	Player	Class	Pos	Height	DoB	Hometown	Previous team
1		Molly Depew	Sophomore	G	5' 8" (1.73 m)		Marblehead, Massachusetts	East Coast Wizards
2		Kourtney Menches	Sophomore	F	5' 2" (1.57 m)		Greer, South Carolina	Shattuck-St. Mary's
4		Sammy Kolowrat	Freshman	F	5' 7" (1.7 m)		Prague, Czech Republic	Czech National Team
5		Casey Leveillee	Junior	F	5' 6" (1.68 m)		Delanson, New York	Northfield Mount Hermon
7		Rachel Ade	Junior	D	5' 9" (1.75 m)		Davenport, Florida	Boston Shamrocks
9		Dayna Colang	Senior	F	5' 7" (1.7 m)		Fairbanks, Alaska	North American Hockey Academy
10		Mackenzie MacNeil	Sophomore	F	5' 8" (1.73 m)		Richmond Hill, Ontario	Toronto Aeros
11		Katherine Pate	Sophomore	D	5' 2" (1.57 m)		Saco, Maine	Assabet Valley
12		Amanda Drobot	Sophomore	D	5' 6" (1.68 m)		Churchville, Pennsylvania	New Jersey Colonials
13		Gina Repaci (C)	Senior	D	5' 8" (1.73 m)		Toronto, Ontario	Mississauga Jr. Chiefs
16		Bridget Baker	Junior	F	5' 3" (1.6 m)		Los Gatos, California	Pursuit of Excellence
17		Bella Webster	Sophomore	F	5' 6" (1.68 m)		Bensenville, Illinois	Chicago Mission
18		Cassidy Campeau	Junior	F	5' 6" (1.68 m)		Nepean, Ontario	Nepean Wildcats
19		Rachel Khalouf	Freshman	D	5' 8" (1.73 m)		Pittsburgh, Pennsylvania	Pittsburgh Penguins Elite
22		Sarah Kelly (C)	Junior	F	5' 5" (1.65 m)		Vestal, New York	North American Hockey Academy
23		Alyssa Gorecki	Freshman	F	5' 4" (1.63 m)		Monee, Illinois	US National Team U18
24		Saana Valkama	Freshman	F	5' 6" (1.68 m)		Pirkkala, Finland	Finland National Team
27		Taylor Willard	Sophomore	D	5' 6" (1.68 m)		Naperville, Illinois	US National Team U18
30		Madison Litchfield	Junior	G	5' 4" (1.63 m)		Williston, Vermont	Boston Shamrocks
44		Victoria Andreakos	Junior	F	5' 6" (1.68 m)		Aurora, Ontario	Toronto Aeros
77		Daria O'Neill	Freshman	D	5' 9" (1.75 m)		Cochrane, Alberta	Edge School

== Schedule ==
Date	Opponent^{#}	Rank^{#}	Site	Decision	Result	Record
Regular Season
October 2	#9 Bemidji State*		Gutterson Fieldhouse • Burlington, VT	Madison Litchfield	L 1–2	0–1–0
October 3	#9 Bemidji State*		Gutterson Fieldhouse • Burlington, VT	Madison Litchfield	L 0–3	0–2–0
October 9	#5 Clarkson*		Gutterson Fieldhouse • Burlington, VT	Madison Litchfield	L 0–5	0–3–0
October 10	at #5 Clarkson*		Cheel Arena • Potsdam, NY	Molly Depew	L 0–3	0–4–0
October 15	St. Lawrence*		Gutterson Fieldhouse • Burlington, VT	Molly Depew	L 0–4	0–5–0
October 16	at St. Lawrence*		Appleton Arena • Canton, NY	Madison Litchfield	L 2–3	0–6–0
October 24	at Providence		Schneider Arena • Providence, RI	Molly Depew	W 3–1	1–6–0 (1–0–0)
October 25	at Boston University		Walter Brown Arena • Boston, MA	Molly Depew	L 2–5	1–7–0 (1–1–0)
October 30	New Hampshire		Gutterson Fieldhouse • Burlington, VT	Molly Depew	L 0–4	1–8–0 (1–2–0)
November 1	Maine		Gutterson Fieldhouse • Burlington, VT	Madison Litchfield	W 4–2	2–8–0 (2–2–0)
November 13	Providence		Gutterson Fieldhouse • Burlington, VT	Madison Litchfield	L 1–4	2–9–0 (2–3–0)
November 14	Providence		Gutterson Fieldhouse • Burlington, VT	Molly Depew	W 4–3	3–9–0 (3–3–0)
November 20	at Connecticut		Freitas Ice Forum • Storrs, CT	Madison Litchfield	L 2–3	3–10–0 (3–4–0)
November 20	at #5 Northeastern		Matthews Arena • Boston, MA	Molly Depew	L 2–5	3–11–0 (3–5–0)
November 28	Ohio State*		Gutterson Fieldhouse • Burlington, VT (Windjammer Classic, Opening Round)	Madison Litchfield	L 2–5	3–12–0
November 29	Cornell*		Gutterson Fieldhouse • Burlington, VT (Windjammer Classic, Consolation Game)	Molly Depew	L 0–4	3–13–0
December 4	#8 Northeastern		Gutterson Fieldhouse • Burlington, VT	Molly Depew	L 1–5	3–14–0 (3–6–0)
December 5	#8 Northeastern		Gutterson Fieldhouse • Burlington, VT	Madison Litchfield	L 1–2	3–15–0 (3–7–0)
December 12	at Dartmouth*		Thompson Arena • Hanover, NH	Molly Depew	W 3–2	4–15–0
January 2, 2016	at Union*		Achilles Center • Schenectady, NY	Madison Litchfield	W 4–2	5–15–0
January 4	Merrimack		Gutterson Fieldhouse • Burlington, VT	Madison Litchfield	L 1–2 ^{OT}	5–16–0 (3–8–0)
January 9	at Maine		Alfond Arena • Orono, ME	Madison Litchfield	T 3–3 ^{OT}	5–16–1 (3–8–1)
January 10	at Maine		Alfond Arena • Orono, ME	Madison Litchfield	W 4–1	6–16–1 (4–8–1)
January 16	Boston University		Gutterson Fieldhouse • Burlington, VT	Madison Litchfield	T 3–3 ^{OT}	6–16–2 (4–8–2)
January 17	Boston University		Gutterson Fieldhouse • Burlington, VT	Molly Depew	L 2–6	6–17–2 (4–9–2)
January 22	at #1 Boston College		Kelley Rink • Chestnut Hill, MA	Madison Litchfield	L 2–6	6–18–2 (4–10–2)
January 23	at #1 Boston College		Kelley Rink • Chestnut Hill, MA	Molly Depew	L 1–6	6–19–2 (4–11–2)
January 29	Connecticut		Gutterson Fieldhouse • Burlington, VT	Madison Litchfield	L 1–2	6–20–2 (4–12–2)
January 30	Connecticut		Gutterson Fieldhouse • Burlington, VT	Madison Litchfield	L 1–3	6–21–2 (4–13–2)
February 5	at New Hampshire		Whittemore Center • Durham, NH	Madison Litchfield	W 2–1	7–21–2 (5–13–2)
February 6	at New Hampshire		Whittemore Center • Durham, NH	Madison Litchfield	W 3–1	8–21–2 (6–13–2)
February 14	#1 Boston College		Gutterson Fieldhouse • Burlington, VT	Madison Litchfield	L 0–3	8–22–2 (6–14–2)
February 19	at Merrimack		Volpe Complex • North Andover, MA	Madison Litchfield	L 1–2	8–23–2 (6–15–2)
February 19	at Merrimack		Volpe Complex • North Andover, MA	Madison Litchfield	T 3–3 ^{OT}	8–23–3 (6–15–3)
WHEA Tournament
February 26	at Boston University*		Walter Brown Arena • Boston, MA (Quarterfinals, Game 1)	Madison Litchfield	L 0–3	8–24–3
February 27	at Boston University*		Walter Brown Arena • Boston, MA (Quarterfinals, Game 2)	Madison Litchfield	W 4–2	9–24–3
February 28	at Boston University*		Walter Brown Arena • Boston, MA (Quarterfinals, Game 3)	Madison Litchfield	W 1–6	9–25–3
*Non-conference game. ^{#}Rankings from USCHO.com Poll.

== Awards and honors ==
- Taylor Willard named Second Team WHEA All-Star

== Miscellaneous ==
- Saana Valkama was named to the 2016 Finnish National Team for the World Championship Tournament.
- Sammy Kolowrat was named to the 2016 Czech Republic National Team for the World Championship Tournament
