= 2015–16 Sacred Heart Pioneers women's ice hockey season =

Doubletree Hockey Classic Champions
- Conference: Division I Independent
- Home ice: Sports Center of Connecticut

Record
- Overall: 12-13-2
- Home: 3-9-1
- Road: 8-4-1
- Neutral: 1-0-0

Coaches and captains
- Head coach: Thomas O'Malley
- Assistant coaches: Katie Dunlop
- Captain: Casey Stathopoulos
- Alternate captain(s): Megan Offner; Hannah Skelley

The 2015-16 Pioneers represented Sacred Heart University as a Division I independent team during the 2015-16 NCAA Division I women's ice hockey season.

== Roster ==
=== 2015–16 Pioneers ===
No.	Nat.	Player	Class	Pos	Height	DoB	Hometown	Previous team
1		Sarah Erban	Freshman	G			Attleboro, Massachusetts	Tilton School
2		Brooke McGreen	Freshman	F			Narragansett, Rhode Island	Narragansett HS
4		Lilly Cleary	Freshman	F			Norwell, Massachusetts	Norwell HS
5		Haley Payne	Freshman	F			Braintree, Massachusetts	Braintree HS
6		Cassandra Hanlon	Sophomore	D			Rowley, Massachusetts	Governor's Academy
7		Elizabeth Johnson	Junior	D	5' 5" (1.65 m)		Milton, Massachusetts	Milton HS
9		Brittany Smith	Sophomore	F			Manchester, Massachusetts	Marblehead HS
10		Julie Dobiac	Senior	D	5' 6" (1.68 m)		Pulaski, New York	Ontario Hockey Academy
11		Taylor Moreland	Sophomore	F			Pleasant Prairie, Wisconsin	Milwaukee Jr. Admirals
12		Amie Varano	Junior	D	5' 5" (1.65 m)		Duxbury, Massachusetts	Notre Dame Academy
13		Megan Finlay	Junior	F	5' 8" (1.73 m)		Cumberland, Maine	Greely HS
14		Heather Daley	Senior	F	5' 5" (1.65 m)		Brewster, New York	Brewster Academy
15		Julia Consorti	Junior	F	5' 5" (1.65 m)		West Haven, Connecticut	West Haven HS
16		Savannah Hersey	Freshman	D			Warwick, Rhode Island	Warwick Veterans Memorial HS
17		Katie Stueve	Freshman	F			Chester Springs, Pennsylvania	Downington East HS
18		Casey Stathopoulos (C)	Senior	F	5' 2" (1.57 m)		Waltham, Massachusetts	Southfield School
19		Megan Offner (A)	Senior	D	5' 8" (1.73 m)		Hamilton, New York	Princeton Day School
20		Alex Davis	Senior	F	5' 6" (1.68 m)		Pembroke, Massachusetts	Pembroke HS
21		Teagan Ketchum	Junior	D	5' 4" (1.63 m)		Averill Park, New York	Albany Academy
22		Elizabeth Collins	Sophomore	F			Duxbury, Massachusetts	Duxbury HS
23		Hannah Sullivan	Freshman	F			Woburn, Massachusetts	Woburn HS
26		Sarah Walewski	Junior	F	5' 5" (1.65 m)		Shelton, Connecticut	St. Joseph Academy
27		Carley Radovich	Sophomore	F			Milford, Massachusetts	Vermont Academy
28		Hannah Skelly (A)	Senior	F	5' 6" (1.68 m)		Wolfeboro, New Hampshire	Brewster Academy
29		Kathryn Darling	Sophomore	F			Vestal, New York	Nichols School
30		Devan Kane	Sophomore	G			Scarborough, Maine	Scarborough HS
31		Amanda Fontaine	Senior	G	5' 3" (1.6 m)		Northfield, Massachusetts	Northfield Mount Hermon HS
33		Nicole Magee	Senior	G	5' 6" (1.68 m)		Burlington, Massachusetts	New Hampton School

== Schedule ==
Date	Opponent^{#}	Rank^{#}	Site	Decision	Result	Record
Regular Season
October 30	at Holy Cross*		Hart Center • Worcester, MA	Amanda Fontaine	L 3–5	0–1–0
October 31	Holy Cross*		Sports Center of Connecticut • Shelton, CT	Amanda Fontaine	L 1–2	0–2–0
November 14	at Brown*		Meehan Auditorium • Providence, RI	Nicole Magee	L 1–6	0–3–0
November 24	at Wesleyan*		Spurrier-Snyder Rink • Middletown, CT	Nicole Magee	W 2–1	1–3–0
November 28	at Morrisville State*		Morrisville State Ice Plex • Morrisville, NY	Nicole Magee	W 7–2	2–3–0
November 29	at Morrisville State*		Morrisville State Ice Plex • Morrisville, NY	Amanda Fontaine	T 1–1 ^{OT}	2–3–1
December 5	at Franklin Pierce*		Jason Ritchie Ice Arena • Winchendon, MA	Nicole Magee	L 1–5	2–4–1
December 6	Franklin Pierce*		Sports Center of Connecticut • Shelton, CT	Amanda Fontaine	T 1–1 ^{OT}	2–4–2
January 2, 2016	Salem State*		Sports Center of Connecticut • Shelton, CT	Nicole Magee	W 6–1	3–4–2
January 3	Saint Anselm*		Sports Center of Connecticut • Shelton, CT	Amanda Fontaine	L 2–3	3–5–2
January 5	at Southern Maine*		USM Ice Arena • Gorham, ME	Nicole Magee	W 2–0	4–5–2
January 6	at Southern Maine*		USM Ice Arena • Gorham, ME	Amanda Fontaine	W 2–1 ^{OT}	5–5–2
January 8	vs. Plymouth State*		Cairns Arena • South Burlington, VT (Doubletree Hockey Classic)	Nicole Magee	W 5–0	6–5–2
January 9	at St. Michaels*		Cairns Arena • South Burlington, VT (Doubletree Hockey Classic)	Amanda Fontaine	W 5–0	7–5–2
January 15	Stevenson*		Sports Center of Connecticut • Shelton, CT	Nicole Magee	L 2–3	7–6–2
January 16	Stevenson*		Sports Center of Connecticut • Shelton, CT	Amanda Fontaine	L 0–2	7–7–2
January 19	Wesleyan*		Sports Center of Connecticut • Shelton, CT	Nicole Magee	L 1–2	7–8–2
January 22	at Becker*		New England Sports Center • Marlboro, MA	Amanda Fontaine	W 3–1	8–8–2
January 29	William Smith*		Sports Center of Connecticut • Shelton, CT	Nicole Magee	L 1–4	8–9–2
January 30	William Smith*		Sports Center of Connecticut • Shelton, CT	Amanda Fontaine	L 1–4	8–10–2
February 2	Becker*		Sports Center of Connecticut • Shelton, CT	Nicole Magee	W 2–1	9–10–2
February 5	at Johnson & Wales*		Lynch Arena • Pawtucket, RI	Amanda Fontaine	W 6–1	10–10–2
February 6	at Johnson & Wales*		Lynch Arena • Pawtucket, RI	Nicole Magee	W 3–1	11–10–2
February 9	at Trinity*		Koeppel Community Sports Center • Hartford, CT	Amanda Fontaine	L 4–3	11–11–2
February 12	Neumann*		Sports Center of Connecticut • Shelton, CT	Nicole Magee	L 2–4	11–12–2
February 13	Neumann*		Sports Center of Connecticut • Shelton, CT	Amanda Fontaine	W 3–0	12–12–2
NEHC Open
February 24	at St. Michaels*		Sports Center of Connecticut • Shelton, CT	Nicole Magee	L 2–5	12–13–2
*Non-conference game. ^{#}Rankings from USCHO.com Poll.
