= 2015–16 Boston College Eagles women's ice hockey season =

Beanpot Champions WHEA Regular Season Champions WHEA Tournament Champions Frozen Four National Championship Game, Lost National Championship to Minnesota, 1–3
- Conference: 1st WHEA
- Home ice: Kelley Rink

Rankings
- USA Today/USA Hockey Magazine: 2nd
- USCHO.com: 2nd

Record
- Overall: 40–1–0
- Home: 19–0–0
- Road: 16–0–0
- Neutral: 5–1–0

Coaches and captains
- Head coach: Katie King-Crowley
- Assistant coaches: Courtney Kennedy
- Captain(s): Alec Carpenter; Dana Trivigno; Andie Anastos
- Alternate captain(s): Lexi Bender; Haley Skarupa

The Boston College Eagles were represented Boston College in Women's Hockey East Association play during the 2015–16 NCAA Division I women's ice hockey season. The Eagles qualified for the NCAA Frozen Four, losing the championship game to Minnesota 3-1. Their only loss of the year came in the NCAA Championship game on March 20, 2016 against the University of Minnesota. They had the second best winning percentage in NCAA Women's Hockey history with a mark of .976

== Offseason ==
- August 17: Five members of the Eagles roster were invited to participate at the 2015 USA Hockey Women’s National Festival in Lake Placid, New York. Patty Kazmaier Award winner Alex Carpenter was joined by Kali Flanagan, Haley Skarupa, Dana Trivigno and Megan Keller.

=== Recruiting ===
Player	Position	Nationality	Notes
Grace Bizal	Defense	United States	Played with U18 National Team
Erin Connolly	Defense	United States	Played with Assabet Valley
Ryan Little	Forward	United States	Shattuck-St. Mary's
Makenna Newkirk	Forward	United States	Played with Pomfret School
Molly Slowe	Forward	United States	Played with Assabet Valley
Serena Somerfield	Defense	United States	Played with Choate Rosemary

== Roster ==
=== 2015–16 Eagles ===
No.	Nat.	Player	Class	Pos	Height	DoB	Hometown	Previous team
2		Grace Bizal	Freshman	D	5' 5" (1.65 m)		Minnetonka, Minnesota	Minnesota Jr. Whitecaps
3		Serena Somerfield	Freshman	D	5' 9" (1.75 m)		Greenwich, Connecticut	Mid Fairfield CT Stars
4		Megan Keller	Sophomore	D	5' 11" (1.8 m)		Farmington Hills, Michigan	Honeybaked U19
5		Alex Carpenter (C)	Senior	D	5' 7" (1.7 m)		North Reading, Massachusetts	Governor's Academy
6		Kaliya Johnson	Senior	D	5' 7" (1.7 m)		Chandler, Arizona	North American Hockey Academy
7		Kristyn Capizzano	Junior	F	5' 2" (1.57 m)		Oakville, Ontario	Mississauga Jr. Chiefs
8		Dana Trivigno (C)	Senior	F	5' 4" (1.63 m)		Setauket, New York	Shattuck-St. Mary's
9		Tori Sullivan	Sophomore	F	5' 5" (1.65 m)		West Bloomfield, Michigan	Honeybaked U19
10		Kali Flanagan	Sophomore	D	5' 5" (1.65 m)		Burlington, Massachusetts	National Sports Academy
12		Kenzie Kent	Sophomore	F	5' 6" (1.68 m)		Norwell, Massachusetts	Noble and Greenough
13		Haley McLain	Junior	F	5' 1" (1.55 m)		Howell, Michigan	Honeybaked U19
14		Molly Slowe	Freshman	F	5' 6" (1.68 m)		Medfield, Massachusetts	Assabet Valley U19
15		Erin Connolly	Freshman	D	5' 7" (1.7 m)		South Boston, Massachusetts	Assabet Valley U19
17		Meghan Grieves	Senior	F	5' 8" (1.73 m)		Cary, North Carolina	Culver Academy
18		Toni Ann Miano	Sophomore	D	5' 4" (1.63 m)		Bronx, New York	North American Hockey Academy
19		Makenna Newkirk	Freshman	F	5' 7" (1.7 m)		Scottsdale, Arizona	Southern CT Stars U19
21		Lexi Bender (A)	Senior	D	5' 8" (1.73 m)		Snohomish, Washington	Shattuck-St. Mary's
22		Haley Skarupa (A)	Senior	F	5' 6" (1.68 m)		Rockville, Maryland	Washington Pride U19
23		Andie Anastos (C)	Junior	F	5' 8" (1.73 m)		Farmington Hills, Michigan	Honeybaked U19
28		Kathleen McNamara	Freshman	D	5' 7" (1.7 m)		Montville, New Jersey	New Jersey Rockets U19
32		Gabri Switaj	Sophomore	G	5' 3" (1.6 m)		Kent, Ohio	Culver Academy
33		Katie Burt	Sophomore	G	5' 6" (1.68 m)		Lynn, Massachusetts	Buckingham, Brown and Nichols

== Schedule ==
|- |-

Date	Opponent^{#}	Rank^{#}	Site	Decision	Result	Record
Regular Season
October 2	Minnesota-Duluth*	#2	Kelley Rink • Chestnut Hill, MA	Katie Burt	W 4–1	1–0–0
October 3	Minnesota-Duluth*	#2	Kelley Rink • Chestnut Hill, MA	Katie Burt	W 4–2	2–0–0
October 11	St. Lawrence*	#2	Kelley Rink • Chestnut Hill, MA	Katie Burt	W 7–4	3–0–0
October 12	St. Lawrence*	#2	Kelley Rink • Chestnut Hill, MA	Gabri Switaj	W 7–3	4–0–0
October 17	Maine	#2	Kelley Rink • Chestnut Hill, MA	Katie Burt	W 4–0	5–0–0 (1–0–0)
October 17	New Hampshire	#2	Kelley Rink • Chestnut Hill, MA	Katie Burt	W 6–0	6–0–0 (2–0–0)
October 23	at #9 Cornell*	#2	Lynah Rink • Ithaca, NY	Katie Burt	W 4–1	7–0–0
October 24	at #9 Cornell*	#2	Lynah Rink • Ithaca, NY	Katie Burt	W 8–0	8–0–0
October 30	Connecticut	#2	Kelley Rink • Chestnut Hill, MA	Katie Burt	W 4–0	9–0–0 (3–0–0)
October 31	at Connecticut	#2	Freitas Ice Forum • Storrs, CT	Katie Burt	W 4–0	10–0–0 (4–0–0)
November 7	at Boston University	#2	Walter Brown Arena • Boston, MA	Katie Burt	W 8–1	11–0–0 (5–0–0)
November 10	Boston University	#2	Kelley Rink • Chestnut Hill, MA	Katie Burt	W 4–3 ^{OT}	12–0–0 (6–0–0)
November 13	New Hampshire	#2	Kelley Rink • Chestnut Hill, MA	Gabri Switaj	W 6–1	13–0–0 (7–0–0)
November 14	at New Hampshire	#2	Whittemore Center • Durham, NH	Katie Burt	W 3–0	14–0–0 (8–0–0)
November 20	#5 Northeastern	#2	Kelley Rink • Chestnut Hill, MA	Katie Burt	W 4–2	15–0–0 (9–0–0)
November 25	Providence	#2	Kelley Rink • Chestnut Hill, MA	Gabri Switaj	W 9–1	16–0–0 (10–0–0)
November 28	at #4 Northeastern	#2	Matthews Arena • Boston, MA	Katie Burt	W 6–1	17–0–0 (11–0–0)
December 5	at Maine	#2	Alfond Arena • Orono, ME	Katie Burt	W 5–0	18–0–0 (12–0–0)
December 6	at Maine	#2	Alfond Arena • Orono, ME	Katie Burt	W 7–2	19–0–0 (13–0–0)
December 10	at Syracuse*	#2	Tennity Ice Skating Pavilion • Syracuse, NY	Katie Burt	W 7–2	20–0–0
January 9, 2016	at Boston University	#1	Walter Brown Arena • Boston, MA	Katie Burt	W 4–3	21–0–0 (14–0–0)
January 15	at Merrimack	#1	Volpe Complex • North Andover, MA	Katie Burt	W 2–0	22–0–0 (15–0–0)
January 16	Merrimack	#1	Kelley Rink • Chestnut Hill, MA	Gabri Switaj	W 6–0	23–0–0 (16–0–0)
January 19	at Harvard*	#1	Bright-Landry Hockey Center • Allston, MA	Katie Burt	W 2–0	24–0–0
January 22	Vermont	#1	Kelley Rink • Chestnut Hill, MA	Katie Burt	W 6–2	25–0–0 (17–0–0)
January 23	Vermont	#1	Kelley Rink • Chestnut Hill, MA	Gabri Switaj	W 6–1	26–0–0 (18–0–0)
January 26	at Merrimack	#1	Volpe Complex • North Andover, MA	Katie Burt	W 4–1	27–0–0 (19–0–0)
February 2	vs. Harvard*	#1	Walter Brown Arena • Boston, MA (Beanpot, Opening Round)	Katie Burt	W 8–0	28–0–0
February 6	at Connecticut	#1	Freitas Ice Forum • Storrs, CT	Katie Burt	W 5–4	29–0–0 (20–0–0)
February 9	vs. #6 Northeastern*	#1	Walter Brown Arena • Boston, MA (Beanpot Championship)	Katie Burt	W 7–0	30–0–0
February 12	#6 Northeastern	#1	Kelley Rink • Chestnut Hill, MA	Katie Burt	W 5–3	31–0–0 (21–0–0)
February 14	at Vermont	#1	Gutterson Fieldhouse • Burlington, VT	Katie Burt	W 3–0	32–0–0 (22–0–0)
February 19	Providence	#1	Kelley Rink • Chestnut Hill, MA	Katie Burt	W 7–1	33–0–0 (23–0–0)
February 20	at Providence	#1	Schneider Arena • Providence, RI	Katie Burt	W 9–1	34–0–0 (24–0–0)
WHEA Tournament
February 26	Maine*	#1	Kelley Rink • Chestnut Hill, MA (Quarterfinals, Game 1)	Katie Burt	W 5–2	35–0–0
February 27	Maine*	#1	Kelley Rink • Chestnut Hill, MA (Quarterfinals, Game 2)	Katie Burt	W 5–1	36–0–0
March 5	vs. Connecticut*	#1	Volpe Complex • North Andover, MA (Semifinal Game)	Katie Burt	W 4–2	37–0–0
March 6	vs. Boston University*	#1	Volpe Complex • North Andover, MA (Championship Game)	Katie Burt	W 5–0	38–0–0
NCAA Tournament
March 12	#6 Northeastern*	#1	Kelley Rink • Chestnut Hill, MA (Quarterfinal Game)	Katie Burt	W 5–1	39–0–0
March 18	vs. #5 Clarkson*	#1	Whittemore Center • Durham, NH (Semifinal Game Frozen Four)	Katie Burt	W 3–2 ^{OT}	40–0–0
March 20	vs. #2 Minnesota*	#1	Whittemore Center • Durham, NH (National Championship)	Katie Burt	L 1–3	40–1–0
*Non-conference game. ^{#}Rankings from USCHO.com Poll.

== Awards and honors ==
- Makenna Newkirk, Hockey East Rookie of the Year
- Katie King-Crowley, NCAA Coach of the Year, WHEA Coach of the Year (3rd consecutive)
- Katie Burt, WHEA Goaltending Champion

=== Hockey East All-Stars ===
- Alexandra Carpenter (Forward), 2015-16 Hockey East First Team All-Star
- Megan Keller (Defender), Hockey East First Team All-Star
- Lexi Bender (Defender), Hockey East First Team All-Star
- Haley Skarupa (Forward), Hockey East First Team All-Star
- Makenna Newkirk (Forward), Hockey East Pro-Ambitions All-Rookie Team
- Katie Burt (Goaltender), Hockey East All-Star Honorable Mention
- Dana Trivigno (Forward), Hockey East All-Star Honorable Mention

== Miscellaneous ==
- The 2015-16 BC Eagles were the second NCAA women's hockey team to record 40 wins in a single season.
- The team competed in their first NCAA National Championship game
- They set the all-time Hockey East Women's record for single season goals, with 114.
- Alex Carpenter (51 points) and Haley Skarupa (49 points) had their best Hockey East scoring seasons. Both women placed in the top five all-time single season point scorers.
- Katie Burt led Hockey East in all major goaltending statistics.
