= 2015–16 Lindenwood Lady Lions ice hockey season =

2015–16 Lindenwood Lady Lions women's ice hockey season
- Conference: College Hockey America
- Home ice: Lindenwood Ice Arena

Record
- Overall: 9–24–4
- Home: 3–10–3
- Road: 6–14–1

Coaches and captains
- Head coach: Scott Spencer
- Assistant coaches: Cory Whitaker; Melanie Jue
- Captain: Tae Otte
- Alternate captain(s): Brooke Peden, Shara Jasper, Nicole Hensley

The Lindenwood Lady Lions women represented Lindenwood University in CHA women's ice hockey during the 2015-16 NCAA Division I women's ice hockey season. The Lady Lions finished conference play in fifth place, and were eliminated in the first round of the CHA Tournament Final by Robert Morris.

== Offseason ==
- May 19: Nicole Hensley attended the Team USA Goaltending Development Camp.

=== Recruiting ===
Player	Position	Nationality	Notes
Jolene Debruyn	Goaltender	Canada	With Team Alberta U18 in 2015 Canada Winter Games
Carla Goodwin	Forward	Canada	Attended Pursuit of Excellence Academy
Alexandra Larson	Defense	Canada	Teammate of Goodwin, Welsh and Lemoine at Pursuit of Excellence
Tirra Lemoine	Forward	Canada	Played for Team Manitoba U18
Shannon Morris-Reade	Forward	Canada	Played for Team British Columbia U18 in 2015 Canada Winter Games
Corbin Welsh	Forward	Canada	Competed with Pursuit of Excellence

== Roster ==
=== 2015–16 Lady Lions ===
No.	Nat.	Player	Class	Pos	Height	DoB	Hometown	Previous team
3		Rachel Weich	Senior	D	5' 5" (1.65 m)		St. Charles, Missouri	National Sports Academy
4		Carrie Atkinson	Junior	D	5' 9" (1.75 m)		Fort Worth, Texas	Dallas Stars Elite
7		Sarah Bobrowski	Sophomore	F	5' 3" (1.6 m)		Woodbury, Minnesota	Hill-Murray HS
8		Tirra Lemoine	Freshman	F	5' 7" (1.7 m)		St. Lazare, Manitoba	Pursuit of Excellence
10		Emily Gunderson	Sophomore	F	5' 7" (1.7 m)		Dodge Center, Minnesota	Dodge County
13		Tae Otte (C)	Sophomore (RS)	D	5' 8" (1.73 m)		Grand Rapids, Michigan	Little Caesar's
17		Shara Jasper (A)	Senior	F	5' 5" (1.65 m)		Aurora, Colorado	Minnesota Duluth (WCHA)
19		Kaitlyn Davidson	Sophomore	F	5' 11" (1.8 m)		Mars, Pennsylvania	Team Pittsburgh
20		Holly Dietzler	Sophomore	F	5' 5" (1.65 m)		Bloomington, Minnesota	Jefferson HS
21		Corbin Welsh	Freshman	F	5' 5" (1.65 m)		Grand Prairie, Alberta	Pursuit of Excellence
22		Brooke Peden (A)	Senior	D	5' 7" (1.7 m)		Minburn, Alberta	Edmonton Thunder
23		Shannon Morris-Reade	Freshman	F	5' 8" (1.73 m)		Port Coquitlam, British Columbia	Team British Columbia U18
24		Katie Nokelby	Junior	D	5' 11" (1.8 m)		Anchorage, Alaska	Alaska All-Stars
25		Xylia Lang	Sophomore	D	5' 7" (1.7 m)		St. Paul, Minnesota	Roseville HS
26		Britainnia Gillanders	Sophomore	F	5' 10" (1.78 m)		Kyle, Saskatchewan	Warner School
29		Nicole Hensley (A)	Senior	G	5' 6" (1.68 m)		Lakewood, Colorado	Colorado Select
30		Jolene deBruyn	Freshman	G	5' 9" (1.75 m)		Grande Prairie, Alberta	Team Alberta U18
31		Sarah McGall	Junior	G	5' 7" (1.7 m)		Owen Sound, Ontario	Ottawa Jr. Senators

== Schedule ==
Date	Opponent^{#}	Rank^{#}	Site	Decision	Result	Record
Regular Season
September 26	Minnesota Duluth*		Lindenwood Ice Arena • Wentzville, MO	Nicole Hensley	L 3–4	0–1–0
September 27	Minnesota Duluth*		Lindenwood Ice Arena • Wentzville, MO	Jolene deBruyn	L 1–4	0–2–0
October 2	Ohio State*		Lindenwood Ice Arena • Wentzville, MO	Nicole Hensley	L 1–5	0–3–0
October 3	Ohio State*		Lindenwood Ice Arena • Wentzville, MO	Nicole Hensley	L 2–3	0–4–0
October 9	at New Hampshire*		Whittemore Center • Durham, NH	Nicole Hensley	W 4–2	1–4–0
October 10	at Northeastern*		Matthews Arena • Boston, MA	Jolene deBruyn	W 4–2	2–4–0
October 30	Penn State		Lindenwood Ice Arena • Wentzville, MO	Nicole Hensley	W 5–2	3–4–0 (1–0–0)
October 31	Penn State		Lindenwood Ice Arena • Wentzville, MO	Nicole Hensley	T 1–1 ^{OT}	3–4–1 (1–0–1)
November 6	Syracuse		Lindenwood Ice Arena • Wentzville, MO	Jolene deBruyn	L 1–3	3–5–1 (1–1–1)
November 7	Syracuse		Lindenwood Ice Arena • Wentzville, MO	Nicole Hensley	T 1–1 ^{OT}	3–5–2 (1–1–2)
November 13	at Mercyhurst		Mercyhurst Ice Center • Erie, PA	Nicole Hensley	L 2–3	3–6–2 (1–2–2)
November 14	at Mercyhurst		Mercyhurst Ice Center • Erie, PA	Nicole Hensley	L 1–2	3–7–2 (1–3–2)
November 21	at #1 Wisconsin*		LaBahn Arena • Madison, WI	Nicole Hensley	L 1–5	3–8–2
November 22	at #1 Wisconsin*		LaBahn Arena • Madison, WI	Jolene deBruyn	L 0–4	3–9–2
November 28	St. Cloud State*		Lindenwood Ice Arena • Wentzville, MO	Nicole Hensley	L 0–2	3–10–2
November 29	St. Cloud State*		Lindenwood Ice Arena • Wentzville, MO	Nicole Hensley	L 2–3	3–11–2
December 4	at RIT		Gene Polisseni Center • Rochester, NY	Nicole Hensley	W 4–1	4–11–2 (2–3–2)
December 5	at RIT		Gene Polisseni Center • Rochester, NY	Nicole Hensley	T 1–1 ^{OT}	4–11–3 (2–3–3)
December 12	Robert Morris		Lindenwood Ice Arena • Wentzville, MO	Nicole Hensley	T 3–3 ^{OT}	4–11–4 (2–3–4)
December 13	Robert Morris		Lindenwood Ice Arena • Wentzville, MO	Nicole Hensley	L 1–4	4–12–4 (2–4–4)
January 3, 2016	at Minnesota State*		Verizon Wireless Center • Mankato, MN	Nicole Hensley	L 2–4	4–13–4
January 4	at Minnesota State*		Verizon Wireless Center • Mankato, MN	Nicole Hensley	W 3–1	5–13–4
January 6	at #6 Bemidji State*		Sanford Center • Bemidji, MN	Jolene deBruyn	L 1–2	5–14–4
January 7	at #6 Bemidji State*		Sanford Center • Bemidji, MN	Nicole Hensley	L 3–5	5–15–4
January 22	Mercyhurst		Lindenwood Ice Arena • Wentzville, MO	Nicole Hensley	L 0–2	5–16–4 (2–5–4)
January 23	Mercyhurst		Lindenwood Ice Arena • Wentzville, MO	Nicole Hensley	W 1–0	6–16–4 (3–5–4)
January 29	at Robert Morris		RMU Island Sports Center • Neville Township, PA	Nicole Hensley	L 2–5	6–17–4 (3–6–4)
January 30	at Robert Morris		RMU Island Sports Center • Neville Township, PA	Nicole Hensley	L 2–3	6–18–4 (3–7–4)
February 5	RIT		Lindenwood Ice Arena • Wentzville, MO	Nicole Hensley	L 2–3	6–19–4 (3–8–4)
February 6	RIT		Lindenwood Ice Arena • Wentzville, MO	Nicole Hensley	W 2–1	7–19–4 (4–8–4)
February 12	at Penn State		Pegula Ice Arena • University Park, PA	Nicole Hensley	L 0–3	7–20–4 (4–9–4)
February 13	at Penn State		Pegula Ice Arena • University Park, PA	Nicole Hensley	W 1–0	8–20–4 (5–9–4)
February 19	at Syracuse		Oncenter War Memorial Arena • Syracuse, NY	Nicole Hensley	L 1–6	8–21–4 (5–10–4)
February 20	at Syracuse		Oncenter War Memorial Arena • Syracuse, NY	Nicole Hensley	L 0–2	8–22–4 (5–11–4)
CHA Tournament
February 26	at Robert Morris*		RMU Island Sports Center • Neville Township, PA (Quarterfinals, Game 1)	Nicole Hensley	W 4–3	9–22–4
February 27	at Robert Morris*		RMU Island Sports Center • Neville Township, PA (Quarterfinals, Game 2)	Nicole Hensley	L 1–3	9–23–4
February 28	at Robert Morris*		RMU Island Sports Center • Neville Township, PA (Quarterfinals, Game 3)	Nicole Hensley	L 1–5	9–24–4
*Non-conference game. ^{#}Rankings from USCHO.com Poll.

== Awards and honors ==
- Nicole Hensley G, 2015–16 All-CHA First Team
- Sharra Jasper F, 2015–16 All-CHA First Team
- Shannon Morris-Reade F, 2015–16 All-CHA Rookie Team
