= 2015–16 North Dakota Fighting Hawks women's ice hockey season =

- Conference: 3rd WCHA
- Home ice: Ralph Engelstad Arena

Rankings
- USA Today/USA Hockey Magazine: 10th
- USCHO.com: 9th

Record
- Overall: 18–12–5
- Conference: 15–10–5
- Home: 8–6–2
- Road: 10–6–3
- Neutral: 0–0–0

Coaches and captains
- Head coach: Brian Idalski
- Assistant coaches: Peter Elander; Erik Fabian
- Captain: Halli Krzyzaniak
- Alternate captain(s): Tanja Eisenschmid; Becca Kohler; Layla Marvin

The 2015–16 North Dakota Fighting Hawks women's ice hockey season represented the University of North Dakota in the WCHA during the 2015-16 NCAA Division I women's ice hockey season. They played their home games at Ralph Engelstad Arena and were coached by Brian Idalski.

While the team lost some notable players in the offseason, they added some notable prospects in Kristen Campbell, Anna Kilponen, and Vilma Tanskanen. Kilponen and Tanskanen were both members of the Finnish National Team at the 2014 Olympics.

The team finished the regular season in fourth place, but made it to the semifinals in the WCHA tournament. However, they would fall to 0–2 to Minnesota.

== Offseason ==
- August 17: Five Fighting Hawks were set to compete in the US-Canada U22 Series held in Lake Placid, NY. Halli Krzyzaniak and Becca Kohler were chosen by Canada, while Gracen Hirschy, Amy Menke and Lexie Shaw were chosen for the US.

=== Departures ===
Player	Position	Nationality	Reason
Johanna Fällman	Defense	Sweden	Graduation
Kara Tupa	Forward	United States	Transferred to Concordia College
Andrea Dalen	Forward	Norway	Graduation
Tori Williams	Defense	Canada	Graduation
Leah Jensen	Forward	United States	Graduation
Josefine Jakobsen	Forward	Denmark	Graduation

=== Recruiting ===
Player	Position	Nationality	Notes
Breanna Berndsen	Forward	Canada	Attended Pursuit of Excellence Academy
Kristen Campbell	Goaltender	Canada	Goaltender for Team Manitoba U-18
Charly Dahlquist	Forward	United States	Attended USA National Camp for two years
Taylor Flaherty	Defender	United States	Captain of Lakeville North (MN) HS Team
Anna Kilponen	Defender	Finland	Member of the Finnish National Team at the 2014 Olympics
Rebekah Kolstad	Forward	United States	Played with Team USA U18
Dorottya (Dorci) Medgyes	Forward/Defender	Hungary	First NCAA Div. I Player from Hungary
Vilma Tanskanen	Forward	Finland	Member of the Finnish National Team at the 2014 Olympics

== Standings ==
2015–16 Western Collegiate Hockey Association standings
	Conference								Overall					
	GP	W	L	T	SW	PTS	GF	GA	GP	W	L	T	GF	GA
#3 Wisconsin*†	28	24	3	1	1	74	100	22	40	35	4	1	154	29
#1 Minnesota	28	24	3	1	0	73	139	39	40	35	4	1	187	51
#10 Bemidji State	28	17	9	2	1	54	56	51	36	22	11	3	77	68
#8 North Dakota	28	13	10	5	2	46	54	49	35	18	12	5	79	62
St. Cloud State	28	9	15	4	3	34	44	88	35	13	18	4	63	115
Minnesota Duluth	28	10	17	1	0	31	67	84	37	15	21	1	90	109
Ohio State	28	6	21	1	1	20	58	110	36	10	25	1	80	134
Minnesota State	28	0	25	3	0	3	41	116	36	3	29	4	55	137
Championship: Wisconsin † indicates conference regular season champion * indicates conference tournament champion Current rankings: USCHO.com Division I women's poll

== Roster ==
No.	Nat.	Player	Class	Pos	Height	DoB	Hometown	Previous team
1	(United States)	Shelby Amsley-Benzie	Senior	G	5' 7" (1.7 m)	1993-00-00	Warroad, Minnesota	Warroad HS (USHS)
4	(United States)	Sam LaShomb	Senior	D	5' 9" (1.75 m)	1994-07-03	Inver Grove Heights, Minnesota	South St. Paul HS (USHS)
5	(Finland)	Anna Kilponen	Freshman	D	5' 7" (1.7 m)	1995-05-16	Orivesi, Finland	Finnish National Team
6	(United States)	Gracen Hirschy	Junior	D	5' 9" (1.75 m)	1995-04-04	Fort Wayne, Indiana	Culver Academy (USHS)
7	(United States)	Jordan Hampton	Junior (RS)	D	5' 7" (1.7 m)	1994-02-17	Foxborough, Massachusetts	Northeastern
8	(United States)	Samantha Hanson	Senior	D	5' 8" (1.73 m)	1993-12-14	White Bear Lake, Minnesota	White Bear Lake HS (USHS)
9	(United States)	Taylor Flaherty	Freshman	D	5' 9" (1.75 m)	1996-01-16	Lakeville, Minnesota	Lakeville North HS (USHS)
10	(United States)	Charly Dahlquist	Freshman	F	5' 8" (1.73 m)		Eden Prairie, Minnesota	Lakeville North HS (USHS)
11	(United States)	Shannon Kaiser	Senior	F	5' 8" (1.73 m)		Crookston, Minnesota	Crookston HS (USHS)
13	(United States)	Layla Marvin (A)	Senior	F	5' 5" (1.65 m)	1993-03-08	Warroad, Minnesota	Warroad HS (USHS)
14	(United States)	Marissa Salo	Junior	F	5' 9" (1.75 m)		Grand Rapids, Minnesota	North American Hockey Academy
15	(United States)	Kayla Gardner	Junior	F	5' 9" (1.75 m)	1994-11-16	Warroad, Minnesota	Warroad HS (USHS)
16	(Finland)	Vilma Tanskanen	Freshman	F	5' 9" (1.75 m)	1995-04-14	Vantaa, Finland	Finnish National Team
17	(Hungary)	Dorci Medgyes	Freshman	F/D	5' 7" (1.7 m)	1996-03-09	Budapest, Hungary	Hungarian National Team
18	(Canada)	Halli Krzyzaniak (C)	Junior	D	5' 9" (1.75 m)	1995-02-04	Neepawa, Manitoba	Pursuit of Excellence
19	(Canada)	Meghan Dufault	Senior	F	5' 4" (1.63 m)	1994-04-17	Winnipeg, Manitoba	Balmoral Hall
21	(United States)	Amy Menke	Junior	F	5' 6" (1.68 m)	1995-04-09	Shakopee, Minnesota	Shakopee HS (USHS)
22	(Germany)	Tanja Eisenschmid (A)	Senior	D	5' 8" (1.73 m)	1993-04-20	Kaufberen, Germany	German National Team
29	(United States)	Lexie Shaw	Junior	G	5' 7" (1.7 m)	1995-03-10	Troy, Michigan	Honeybaked
29	(Canada)	Breanna Berndsen	Freshman	F	5' 10" (1.78 m)	1997-11-01	Kelowna, British Columbia	Pursuit of Excellence
34	(Canada)	Annie Chipman	Junior (RS)	G	5' 6" (1.68 m)		Winnipeg, Manitoba	St. Mary's Academy
44	(United States)	Rebekah Kolstad	Freshman	F	5' 10" (1.78 m)		Mankato, Minnesota	Team USA U18
50	(Canada)	Kristen Campbell	Freshman	G	5' 10" (1.78 m)	1996-01-21	Brandon, Manitoba	Team Manitoba U18 (USHS)
51	(Canada)	Becca Kohler	Senior	F	6' 0" (1.83 m)	1994-09-03	St. Thomas, Ontario	Bluewater
55	(United States)	Lisa Marvin	Junior	F	5' 8" (1.73 m)	1994-08-18	Warroad, Minnesota	Warroad HS (USHS)

== Schedule ==
Date	Opponent^{#}	Rank^{#}	Site	Decision	Result	Record
Regular Season
October 2	at Rensselaer*	#6	Houston Field House • Troy, NY	Shelby Amsley-Benzie	W 4–3	1–0–0 (0–0–0)
October 3	at Rensselaer*	#6	Houston Field House • Troy, NY	Lexie Shaw	W 4–1	2–0–0 (0–0–0)
October 9	at Minnesota State	#6	Verizon Wireless Center • Mankato, MN	Shelby Amsley-Benzie	W 2–1	3–0–0 (1–0–0)
October 10	at Minnesota State	#6	Verizon Wireless Center • Mankato, MN	Lexie Shaw	W 4–2	4–0–0 (2–0–0)
October 16	at Bemidji State	#6	Sanford Center • Bemidji, MN	Shelby Amsley-Benzie	T 0–0 ^{OT}	4–0–1 (2–0–1)
October 17	Bemidji State	#6	Ralph Engelstad Arena • Grand Forks, ND	Lexie Shaw	L 1–2 ^{OT}	4–1–1 (2–1–1)
October 23	at St. Cloud State	#7	Herb Brooks National Hockey Center • St. Cloud, MN	Shelby Amsley-Benzie	W 3–0	5–1–1 (3–1–1)
October 24	at St. Cloud State	#7	Herb Brooks National Hockey Center • St. Cloud, MN	Lexie Shaw	T 4–4 ^{OT}	5–1–2 (3–1–2)
October 29	#1 Minnesota	#7	Ralph Engelstad Arena • Grand Forks, ND	Shelby Amsley-Benzie	L 1–5	5–2–2 (3–2–2)
October 30	#1 Minnesota	#7	Ralph Engelstad Arena • Grand Forks, ND	Shelby Amsley-Benzie	W 4–3	6–2–2 (4–2–2)
November 14	Ohio State	#6	Ralph Engelstad Arena • Grand Forks, ND	Shelby Amsley-Benzie	L 2–3	6–3–2 (4–3–2)
November 15	Ohio State	#6	Ralph Engelstad Arena • Grand Forks, ND	Shelby Amsley-Benzie	W 4–1	7–3–2 (5–3–2)
November 20	Minnesota-Duluth	#7	Ralph Engelstad Arena • Grand Forks, ND	Shelby Amsley-Benzie	W 4–3	8–3–2 (6–3–2)
November 21	Minnesota-Duluth	#7	Ralph Engelstad Arena • Grand Forks, ND	Shelby Amsley-Benzie	L 0–1	8–4–2 (6–4–2)
November 27	at Syracuse*	#9	Oncenter War Memorial Arena • Syracuse, NY	Shelby Amsley-Benzie	W 3–0	9–4–2 (6–4–2)
November 28	at Syracuse*	#9	Tennity Ice Skating Pavilion • Syracuse, NY	Shelby Amsley-Benzie	L 2–5	9–5–2 (6–4–2)
December 4	at #6 Bemidji State	#9	Sanford Center • Bemidji, MN	Shelby Amsley-Benzie	W 1–0	10–5–2 (7–4–2)
December 6	#6 Bemidji State	#9	Ralph Engelstad Arena • Grand Forks, ND	Shelby Amsley-Benzie	L 0–1	10–6–2 (7–5–2)
December 11	#1 Wisconsin	#9	Ralph Engelstad Arena • Grand Forks, ND	Shelby Amsley-Benzie	W 3–0	11–6–2 (8–5–2)
December 12	#1 Wisconsin	#9	Ralph Engelstad Arena • Grand Forks, ND	Shelby Amsley-Benzie	T 0–0 ^{OT}	11–6–3 (8–5–3)
January 15, 2016	Minnesota-Duluth	#9	Amsoil Arena • Duluth, MN	Shelby Amsley-Benzie	W 2–1	12–6–3 (9–5–3)
January 16	Minnesota-Duluth	#9	Amsoil Arena • Duluth, MN	Shelby Amsley-Benzie	W 4–3 ^{OT}	13–6–3 (10–5–3)
January 23	at #2 Wisconsin	#8	LaBahn Arena • Madison, WI	Shelby Amsley-Benzie	L 0–1	13–7–3 (10–6–3)
January 24	at #2 Wisconsin	#8	LaBahn Arena • Madison, WI	Shelby Amsley-Benzie	L 1–3	13–8–3 (10–7–3)
January 29	Minnesota State	#8	Ralph Engelstad Arena • Grand Forks, ND	Shelby Amsley-Benzie	W 2–1	14–8–3 (11–7–3)
January 30	Minnesota State	#8	Ralph Engelstad Arena • Grand Forks, ND	Shelby Amsley-Benzie	T 5–5 ^{OT}	14–8–4 (11–7–4)
February 5	at #3 Minnesota	#8	Ridder Arena • Minneapolis, MN	Shelby Amsley-Benzie	L 0–3	14–9–4 (11–8–4)
February 6	at #3 Minnesota	#8	Ridder Arena • Minneapolis, MN	Shelby Amsley-Benzie	T 0–0 ^{OT}	14–9–5 (11–8–5)
February 12	St. Cloud State	#9	Ralph Engelstad Arena • Grand Forks, ND	Shelby Amsley-Benzie	L 0–1	14–10–5 (11–9–5)
February 13	St. Cloud State	#9	Ralph Engelstad Arena • Grand Forks, ND	Shelby Amsley-Benzie	W 3–0	15–10–5 (12–9–5)
February 19	at Ohio State	#9	OSU Ice Rink • Columbus, OH	Shelby Amsley-Benzie	L 1–3	15–11–5 (12–10–5)
February 20	at Ohio State	#9	OSU Ice Rink • Columbus, OH	Shelby Amsley-Benzie	W 3–2	16–11–5 (13–10–5)
WCHA Tournament
February 26	St. Cloud State*	#10	Ralph Engelstad Arena • Grand Forks, ND (Quarterfinal, Game 1)	Shelby Amsley-Benzie	W 6–1	17–11–5 (14–10–5)
February 27	St. Cloud State*	#10	Ralph Engelstad Arena • Grand Forks, ND (Quarterfinal, Game 2)	Shelby Amsley-Benzie	W 6–1	18–11–5 (15–10–5)
March 5	#2 Minnesota*	#8	Ridder Arena • Minneapolis, MN (Semifinal Game)	Shelby Amsley-Benzie	L 0–2	18–12–5 (15–11–5)
*Non-conference game. ^{#}Rankings from USCHO.com Poll.

== Awards and honors ==
Annual Awards & Honors
Player	Award
Shelby Amsley-Benzie	Academic All-American First Team
Anna Kilponen	All-WCHA Rookie Team, D
Amy Menke	All-WCHA Second Team
Shelby Amsley-Benzie	All-WCHA Third Team
Halli Krzyzaniak	All-WCHA Third Team
