= Vilma Tanskanen =

Finnish ice hockey player

- Born: 14 April 1995 (age 31) Vantaa, Greater Helsinki, Finland
- Height: 1.75 m (5 ft 9 in)
- Weight: 68 kg (150 lb; 10 st 10 lb)
- Position: Forward
- Shot: Left
- Played for: Linköping HC; Mercyhurst Lakers; UND Fighting Hawks; Espoo Blues; KJT Kerava; Team Oriflame
- National team: Finland
- Playing career: 2011–2020
Medal record
World Championship
| Bronze medal – third place | 2015 Sweden |

Vilma Tanskanen (born 14 April 1995) is a Finnish retired ice hockey player. As a member of the Finnish national team, she won a bronze medal at the 2015 IIHF Women's World Championship and played in the 2016 IIHF Women's World Championship and the women's ice hockey tournament at the 2014 Winter Olympics in Sochi, Russia.

== Playing career ==
As a teen, Tanskanen played four seasons in the Naisten Liiga, the top-tier of women's ice hockey in Finland. While attending the Kuortaneen urheilulukio in Kuortane for secondary school during 2011 to 2014, she played with Team Oriflame under head coach Jari Risku. For the 2014–15 season, she returned to her youth club, Keski-Uudenmaan Juniorijääkiekkoilun Tuki (KJT), to play with its women's representative team, KJT Haukat, which had secured promotion to the Naisten Liiga from the Naisten Mestis at the conclusion of the 2012–13 season. When KJT Haukat failed to qualify for the 2015 playoffs, Tanskanen signed with the Espoo Blues Naiset for the post-season, contributing a goal and an assist in six playoff games as the team claimed Aurora Borealis Cup.

=== NCAA ===
In 2015, she and Team Oriflame teammate Anna Kilponen both joined the North Dakota Fighting Hawks women's ice hockey program in the Western Collegiate Hockey Association (WCHA) conference of the NCAA Division I. A defense-minded forward, Tanskanen had modest offensive production during her time with the Fighting Hawks, notching 6 points (4 goals+2 assists) across 33 games in the 2015–16 season and 7 points (3+4) across 32 games of the 2016–17 season. The University of North Dakota suddenly terminated its women's ice hockey program in the spring of 2017, forcing Tanskanen and many of her teammates to scramble for transfer opportunities with other NCAA Division I programs.

Ultimately, Tanskanen joined the Mercyhurst Lakers women's ice hockey program in the College Hockey America (CHA) conference for her final two years of college eligibility. She was joined by North Dakota Fighting Hawks sophomore teammates Kennedy Blair and Emma Nuutinen, who was also a fellow Finnish national team member. Her production increased dramatically at Mercyhust and she tallied a career high 14 goals and 13 assists for 27 points across 33 games in the 2017–18 season – tying with Brooke Hartwick for first on the team in goals and ranking second on the team for scoring behind Maggie Knott, while playing four fewer games than either Hartwick or Knott. Her breakout season was recognized with selection to the All-CHA Conference First Team.

== International play ==
Tanskanen was selected for the Finland women's national ice hockey team in the 2014 Winter Olympics. She played in all six games, not recording a point.

Tanskanen made two appearances with the Finland women's national under-18 ice hockey team, at the IIHF World Women's U18 Championships, with the first in 2012.

== Career statistics ==
=== International career ===
Through 2013–14 season

| Year | Team | Event | GP | G | A | Pts | PIM |
|---|---|---|---|---|---|---|---|
| 2012 | Finland U18 | U18 | 5 | 1 | 0 | 1 | 0 |
| 2013 | Finland U18 | U18 | 5 | 0 | 2 | 2 | 2 |
| 2014 | Finland | Oly | 6 | 0 | 0 | 0 | 0 |
