= 2015–16 Boston University Terriers women's ice hockey season =

- Conference: 3rd WHEA
- Home ice: Walter Brown Arena

Record
- Overall: 23–14–2
- Home: 14–8–0
- Road: 7–4–2
- Neutral: 2–2–0

Coaches and captains
- Head coach: Brian Durocher
- Assistant coaches: Katie Lachapelle; Allison Coomey
- Captain: Kayla Tutino
- Alternate captain(s): Sarah Lefort; Dakota Woodworth

The Boston University Terriers represented Boston University in Women's Hockey East Association during the 2015–16 NCAA Division I women's ice hockey season. The Terriers, defending WHEA Champions, finished 23–14–2 overall, and 17–5–2 in WHEA play.

== Offseason ==
- July 16: Three current members of the Terriers roster, Victoria Bach, Sarah Lefort and Rebecca Leslie were invited to the Canadian U22 camp. Maddie Elia was invited to the USA Hockey Women's National Festival in Lake Placid, New York. Both camps were used to determine rosters for a three-game series involving the Canadian and US Under-22 teams from August 19–22 in Lake Placid, New York.

=== Recruiting ===
Player	Position	Nationality	Notes
Sammy Davis	Forward	United States	Tabor Academy
Connor Galway	Defense	Canada	Toronto Aeros
Mary Grace Kelley	Forward	United States	Dexter-Southfield
Ashlyn Aiello	Goaltender	United States	Phillips Academy

== Roster ==
=== 2015-16 Terriers ===
No.	Nat.	Player	Class	Pos	Height	DoB	Hometown	Previous team
1		Ashlyn Aiello	Freshman	G	5' 0" (1.52 m)		Belmont, Massachusetts	Phillips Academy
4		Sarah Steele	Junior	D	5' 6" (1.68 m)		Stratford, Prince Edward Island	Appleby College
8		Kayla Tutino (C)	Senior	F	5' 5" (1.65 m)		Lorraine, Quebec	Ontario Hockey Academy
9		Sarah Lefort (A)	Senior	F	5' 7" (1.7 m)		Ormstown, Quebec	Stanstead College
10		Alexis Woloschuk	Senior	F	5' 7" (1.7 m)		Winnipeg, Manitoba	Pursuit of Excellence
11		Dakota Woodworth (A)	Senior	F	5' 7" (1.7 m)		Carlisle, Massachusetts	Boston Shamrocks
12		Victoria Bach	Sophomore	F	5' 4" (1.63 m)		Milton, Ontario	Mississauga Jr. Chiefs
14		Maddie Elia	Junior	F	5' 10" (1.78 m)		Lewiston, New York	Nichols School
15		Lillian Ribeirinha-Braga	Senior	D	5' 3" (1.6 m)		Winchester, Massachusetts	Winchendon School
16		Sammy Davis	Freshman	F	5' 4" (1.63 m)		Pembroke, Massachusetts	Tabor Academy
17		Diana Bennett	Senior	D	5' 5" (1.65 m)		Narragansett, Rhode Island	Cushing Academy
18		Rebecca Russo	Senior	F	5' 4" (1.63 m)		Westport, Connecticut	Shattuck-St. Mary's
19		Rebecca Leslie	Sophomore	F	5' 6" (1.68 m)		Ottawa, Ontario	Ottawa Senators (PWHL)
20		Samantha Sutherland	Junior	F	5' 4" (1.63 m)		Cochrane, Alberta	Warner School
21		Natalie Flynn	Junior	F	5' 7" (1.7 m)		Medford, Massachusetts	Cushing Academy
22		Anna Streifel	Freshman (RS)	F	5' 10" (1.78 m)		Bowie, Maryland	Washington Pride
24		Mary Grace Kelley	Freshman	F	5' 5" (1.65 m)		Natick, Massachusetts	Dexter Southfield
25		Alexis Crossley	Junior	D	5' 8" (1.73 m)		Cole Harbour, Nova Scotia	University of New Hampshire
26		Connor Galway	Freshman	D	5' 10" (1.78 m)		Athens, Ontario	Toronto Aeros
27		Jordan Juron	Senior	F	5' 8" (1.73 m)		Latham, New York	Middlesex School
28		Savannah Newton	Sophomore	D	5' 4" (1.63 m)		Halifax, Nova Scotia	Appleby College
30		Mia Becker	Sophomore	G	5' 4" (1.63 m)		Woodbridge, Virginia	Shattuck-St. Mary's
31		Erin O'Neil	Sophomore	G	5' 7" (1.7 m)		Minnetonka, Minnesota	Hopkins High School
33		Victoria Hanson	Junior	G	5' 9" (1.75 m)		Stoughton, Massachusetts	Lawrence Academy

== Schedule ==
Date	Opponent^{#}	Rank^{#}	Site	Decision	Result	Record
Regular Season
October 2	Connecticut	#8	Walter Brown Arena • Boston, MA	Victoria Hanson	W 2–1	1–0–0 (1–0–0)
October 4	at Maine	#8	Alfond Arena • Orono, ME	Victoria Hanson	W 4–2	2–0–0 (2–0–0)
October 9	Penn State*	#7	Walter Brown Arena • Boston, MA	Victoria Hanson	L 3–5	2–1–0
October 10	Penn State*	#7	Walter Brown Arena • Boston, MA	Erin O'Neil	W 3–1	3–1–0
October 16	#4 Clarkson*	#9	Walter Brown Arena • Boston, MA	Victoria Hanson	L 2–4	3–2–0
October 17	#4 Clarkson*	#9	Walter Brown Arena • Boston, MA	Erin O'Neil	L 1–4	3–3–0
October 24	at #10 Northeastern		Matthews Arena • Boston, MA	Victoria Hanson	L 1–7	3–4–0 (2–1–0)
October 25	Vermont		Walter Brown Arena • Boston, MA	Erin O'Neil	W 5–2	4–4–0 (3–1–0)
November 1	at New Hampshire		Whittemore Center • Durham, NH	Erin O'Neil	W 5–3	5–4–0 (4–1–0)
November 3	Yale*		Walter Brown Arena • Boston, MA	Erin O'Neil	W 7–1	6–4–0
November 7	#2 Boston College		Walter Brown Arena • Boston, MA	Erin O'Neil	L 1–8	6–5–0 (4–2–0)
November 10	at #2 Boston College		Kelley Rink • Chestnut Hill, MA	Victoria Hanson	L 3–4 ^{OT}	6–6–0 (4–3–0)
November 14	Maine		Walter Brown Arena • Boston, MA	Victoria Hanson	W 5–4	7–6–0 (5–3–0)
November 15	Maine		Walter Brown Arena • Boston, MA	Erin O'Neil	W 3–2	8–6–0 (6–3–0)
November 20	at Merrimack		Volpe Complex • North Andover, MA	Victoria Hanson	W 5–1	9–6–0 (7–3–0)
November 21	Merrimack		Walter Brown Arena • Boston, MA	Erin O'Neil	W 4–2	10–6–0 (8–3–0)
November 28	vs. Cornell*		Gutterson Fieldhouse • Burlington, VT (Windjammer Classic, Opening Game)	Victoria Hanson	L 2–4	10–7–0
November 29	vs. Ohio State*		Gutterson Fieldhouse • Burlington, VT (Windjammer Classic, Consolation Game)	Erin O'Neil	W 5–3	11–7–0
December 5	at Connecticut		Freitas Ice Forum • Storrs, CT	Erin O'Neil	T 4–4 ^{OT}	11–7–1 (8–3–1)
December 6	Connecticut		Walter Brown Arena • Boston, MA	Erin O'Neil	W 4–3	12–7–1 (9–3–1)
December 9	at Providence		Schneider Arena • Providence, RI	Erin O'Neil	W 6–0	13–7–1 (10–3–1)
January 9, 2016	#1 Boston College		Walter Brown Arena • Boston, MA	Erin O'Neil	L 3–4	13–8–1 (10–4–1)
January 16	at Vermont		Gutterson Fieldhouse • Burlington, VT	Erin O'Neil	T 3–3 ^{OT}	13–8–2 (10–4–2)
January 17	at Vermont		Gutterson Fieldhouse • Burlington, VT	Victoria Hanson	W 6–2	14–8–2 (11–4–2)
January 20	at #4 Quinnipiac*		TD Bank Sports Center • Hamden, CT	Erin O'Neil	L 1–6	14–9–2
January 23	Providence		Walter Brown Arena • Boston, MA	Victoria Hanson	W 5–1	15–9–2 (12–4–2)
January 24	at Providence		Schneider Arena • Providence, RI	Erin O'Neil	W 4–2	16–9–2 (13–4–2)
January 30	Merrimack		Walter Brown Arena • Boston, MA	Erin O'Neil	W 6–2	17–9–2 (14–4–2)
February 2	#6 Northeastern*		Walter Brown Arena • Boston, MA (Beanpot, Opening Round)	Erin O'Neil	L 2–3	17–10–2
February 9	Harvard*		Walter Brown Arena • Boston, MA (Beanpot, Consolation Game)	Victoria Hanson	L 3–5	17–11–2
February 13	New Hampshire		Walter Brown Arena • Boston, MA	Erin O'Neil	W 6–4	18–11–2 (15–4–2)
February 14	at New Hampshire		Whittemore Center • Durham, NH	Erin O'Neil	W 6–2	19–11–2 (16–4–2)
February 19	#6 Northeastern		Walter Brown Arena • Boston, MA	Erin O'Neil	W 3–2	20–11–2 (17–4–2)
February 20	#6 Northeastern		Matthews Arena • Boston, MA	Erin O'Neil	L 2–6	20–12–2 (17–5–2)
WHEA Tournament
February 26	Vermont*		Walter Brown Arena • Boston, MA (Quarterfinals, Game 1)	Erin O'Neil	W 3–0	21–12–2
February 27	Vermont*		Walter Brown Arena • Boston, MA (Quarterfinals, Game 2)	Erin O'Neil	L 2–4	21–13–2
February 28	Vermont*		Walter Brown Arena • Boston, MA (Quarterfinals, Game 3)	Erin O'Neil	W 6–1	22–13–2
March 5	vs. #6 Northeastern*		Volpe Complex • North Andover, MA (Semifinal Game)	Erin O'Neil	W 4–3	23–13–2
March 6	vs. #1 Boston College*		Volpe Complex • North Andover, MA (WHEA Championship)	Erin O'Neil	L 0–5	23–14–2
*Non-conference game. ^{#}Rankings from USCHO.com Poll.

== Awards and honors ==
- Victoria Bach, Forward - Hockey East Second Team WHEA All-Stars
- Rebecca Leslie, Forward - Hockey East Second Team WHEA All-Stars
- Alexis Crossley, Defender - Hockey East WHEA All-Star Honorable Mention
- Sammy Davis, Forward - Hockey East All-Rookie Team
