= 2015–16 Harvard Crimson women's ice hockey season =

- Conference: 5th ECAC
- Home ice: Bright-Landry Hockey Center

Record
- Overall: 17–12–3
- Home: 10–2–2
- Road: 7–9–1
- Neutral: 0–1–0

Coaches and captains
- Head coach: Katey Stone
- Assistant coaches: Lee-J Mirasolo; Liz Keady; Mark Hanson
- Captain(s): Michelle Picard; Emerance Maschmeyer

The Harvard Crimson represented Harvard University in ECAC women's ice hockey during the 2015–16 NCAA Division I women's ice hockey season.

== Offseason ==
- August 8: Crimson players Miye D'Oench, Michelle Picard and Emerance Maschmeyer were drafted in the inaugural NWHL draft.

=== Recruiting ===
Player	Position	Nationality	Notes
Bradley Fusco	Forward	United States	Played for East Coast Wizards
Kate Hallett	Defense	United States	Blueliner for Minnesota Jr. Whitecaps
Kaitlin Tse	Defense	Canada	Member of Team Canada U18
Erin Ozturk	Forward	United States	Played with Connecticut Polar Bears
Audrey Warner	Forward	United States	Attended Shattuck-St. Mary's
Grace Zarzecki	Forward	United States	Competed with Chicago Mission

== Roster ==
=== 2015-16 Crimson ===
No.	Nat.	Player	Class	Pos	Height	DoB	Hometown	Previous team
1		Brianna Laing	Junior	G	5' 6" (1.68 m)		Marblehead, Massachusetts	Noble and Greenough
6		Nikki Friesen	Sophomore	F	5' 4" (1.63 m)		Corvallis, Oregon	Chatfield
7		Natasha Rachlin	Junior	D	5' 4" (1.63 m)		Brookline, Massachusetts	Noble and Greenough
9		Bradley Fusco	Freshman	F	5' 3" (1.6 m)		Winchester, Massachusetts	East Coast Wizards
10		Dani Krzyszczyk	Sophomore	F	5' 6" (1.68 m)		Winnipeg, Manitoba	Shattuck-St. Mary's
11		Audrey Warner	Freshman	F	5' 10" (1.78 m)		Shaker Heights, Ohio	Shattuck-St. Mary's
12		Grace Zarzecki	Freshman	F	5' 5" (1.65 m)		Chicago, Illinois	Chicago Mission
14		Kate Hallett	Freshman	D	5' 8" (1.73 m)		Edina, Minnesota	Minnesota Jr. Whitecaps
15		Mary Parker	Senior	F	5' 9" (1.75 m)		Milton, Massachusetts	Noble and Greenough
16		Lexie Laing	Sophomore	F	5' 6" (1.68 m)		Marblehead, Massachusetts	Noble and Greenough
17		Briana Mastel	Junior	D	5' 8" (1.73 m)		Wallingford, Connecticut	Choate Rosemary Hall
19		Miye D'Oench	Senior	F	5' 4" (1.63 m)		New York, New York	St. Anne's School
20		Michelle Picard (C)	Senior	D	5' 6" (1.68 m)		Taunton, Massachusetts
21		Jessica Harvey	Senior	F	5' 9" (1.75 m)		Norfolk, New York	Norwood Norfolk Central
22		Kaitlin Tse	Freshman	D	5' 7" (1.7 m)		Toronto, Ontario	Team Canada U18
24		Chelsea Ziadie	Sophomore	D	5' 3" (1.6 m)		Pointe Claire, Quebec	Hotchkiss School
25		Sydney Daniels	Junior	F	5' 8" (1.73 m)		Southwick, Massachusetts	Westminster School
26		Haley Mullins	Sophomore	F	5' 9" (1.75 m)		East Greenwich, Rhode Island	Noble and Greenough
27		Karley Heffernan	Sophomore	F	5' 8" (1.73 m)		Sherwood Park, Alberta	Vimy Ridge Academy
28		Abbey Frazer	Junior	D	5' 7" (1.7 m)		Hudson, Quebec	John Abbot College
35		Molly Tissenbaum	Junior	G	5' 7" (1.7 m)		Toronto, Ontario	Premier Elite
38		Emerance Maschmeyer (C)	Senior	G	5' 6" (1.68 m)		Bruderheim, Alberta	John Paul II HS

== Schedule ==
Date	Opponent^{#}	Rank^{#}	Site	Decision	Result	Record
Regular Season
October 23	at Dartmouth	#5	Thompson Arena • Hanover, NH	Emerance Maschmeyer	L 1–2	0–1–0 (0–1–0)
October 30	#4 Clarkson	#8	Bright-Landry Hockey Center • Allston, MA	Molly Tissenbaum	T 0–0 ^{OT}	0–1–1 (0–1–1)
October 31	St. Lawrence	#8	Bright-Landry Hockey Center • Allston, MA	Brianna Laing	W 3–2	1–1–1 (1–1–1)
November 6	at Yale	#9	Ingalls Rink • New Haven, CT	Brianna Laing	W 3–2	2–1–1 (2–1–1)
November 7	at Brown	#9	Meehan Auditorium • Providence, RI	Molly Tissenbaum	W 5–1	3–1–1 (3–1–1)
November 13	Union	#9	Bright-Landry Hockey Center • Allston, MA	Brianna Laing	W 5–0	4–1–1 (4–1–1)
November 14	Rensselaer	#9	Bright-Landry Hockey Center • Allston, MA	Emerance Maschmeyer	W 2–1	5–1–1 (5–1–1)
November 18	New Hampshire*	#9	Bright-Landry Hockey Center • Allston, MA	Emerance Maschmeyer	W 4–0	6–1–1
November 24	#4 Northeastern*	#8	Bright-Landry Hockey Center • Allston, MA	Emerance Maschmeyer	W 3–0	7–1–1
November 27	at #10 Minnesota-Duluth*	#8	Amsoil Arena • Duluth, MN	Emerance Maschmeyer	L 2–4	7–2–1
November 28	at #10 Minnesota-Duluth*	#8	Amsoil Arena • Duluth, MN	Emerance Maschmeyer	W 4–1	8–2–1
December 4	at [[{{{school}}}|Princeton]]	#7	Hobey Baker Memorial Rink • Princeton, NJ	Emerance Maschmeyer	L 1–2 ^{OT}	8–3–1 (5–2–1)
December 4	at #4 Quinnipiac	#7	TD Bank Sports Center • Hamden, CT	Emerance Maschmeyer	L 1–2	8–4–1 (5–3–1)
January 8, 2016	Cornell	#9	Bright-Landry Hockey Center • Allston, MA	Emerance Maschmeyer	W 2–0	9–4–1 (6–3–1)
January 9	#10 Colgate	#9	Bright-Landry Hockey Center • Allston, MA	Emerance Maschmeyer	W 6–2	10–4–1 (7–3–1)
January 15	at St. Lawrence	#8	Appleton Arena • Canton, NY	Emerance Maschmeyer	L 0–2	10–5–1 (7–4–1)
January 16	at Clarkson	#8	Cheel Arena • Potsdam, NY	Emerance Maschmeyer	L 2–5	10–6–1 (7–5–1)
January 19	#1 Boston College*		Bright-Landry Hockey Center • Allston, MA	Emerance Maschmeyer	L 0–2	10–7–1
January 29	#4 Quinnipiac		Bright-Landry Hockey Center • Allston, MA	Emerance Maschmeyer	L 0–1	11–8–1 (8–6–1)
January 30	#9 Princeton		Bright-Landry Hockey Center • Allston, MA	Emerance Maschmeyer	W 4–1	12–8–1 (9–6–1)
February 2	vs. #1 Boston College*		Walter Brown Arena • Boston, MA (Beanpot, Opening Round)	Emerance Maschmeyer	L 0–8	12–9–1
February 5	Brown		Bright-Landry Hockey Center • Allston, MA	Brianna Laing	T 3–3 ^{OT}	12–9–2 (9–6–2)
February 6	Yale		Bright-Landry Hockey Center • Allston, MA	Emerance Maschmeyer	W 4–1	13–9–2 (10–6–2)
February 9	at Boston University*		Walter Brown Arena • Boston, MA (Beanpot, Consolation Game)	Emerance Maschmeyer	W 5–3	14–9–2
February 12	at Rensselaer		Houston Field House • Troy, NY	Emerance Maschmeyer	T 1–1	14–9–3 (10–6–3)
February 13	at Union		Achilles Center • Schenectady, NY	Emerance Maschmeyer	W 3–0	15–9–3 (11–6–3)
February 19	at #10 Colgate		Starr Rink • Hamilton, NY	Emerance Maschmeyer	W 3–2	16–9–3 (12–6–3)
February 20	at Cornell		Lynah Rink • Ithaca, NY	Emerance Maschmeyer	L 2–3 ^{OT}	16–10–3 (12–7–3)
ECAC Tournament
February 26	at #9 Colgate*		Starr Rink • Hamilton, NY (Quarterfinals, Game 1)	Emerance Maschmeyer	L 1–4	16–11–3
February 27	at #9 Colgate*		Starr Rink • Hamilton, NY (Quarterfinals, Game 2)	Emerance Maschmeyer	W 4–1	17–11–3
February 28	at #9 Colgate*		Starr Rink • Hamilton, NY (Quarterfinals, Game 3)	Emerance Maschmeyer	L 2–3 ^{OT}	17–12–3
*Non-conference game. ^{#}Rankings from USCHO.com Poll.

== Awards and honors ==
- Sydney Daniels, Forward, Second Team All-ECAC
- Miye D'Oench, Forward, Second Team All-ECAC
- Emerance Maschmeyer, Goaltender, Second Team All-ECAC
- Michelle Picard, Defense, Third Team All-ECAC
