= 2015–16 Minnesota Golden Gophers women's ice hockey season =

NCAA Division I National Champions Defeated Princeton in First Round 6–2 to advance to Frozen Four Defeated Wisconsin 3–2 in overtime to advance to National Championship Defeated Boston College 3–1 to claim National title, National champions
- Conference: 2nd WCHA
- Home ice: Ridder Arena

Rankings
- USCHO.com: 1st
- USA Today/USA Hockey Magazine: 1st

Record
- Overall: 35–4–1
- Home: 19–0–1
- Road: 13–3–0
- Neutral: 3–1–0

Coaches and captains
- Head coach: Brad Frost
- Assistant coaches: Nadine Muzerall; Joel Johnson
- Captain(s): Hannah Brandt; Lee Stecklein

The 2015–16 Minnesota Golden Gophers women's ice hockey season represented the University of Minnesota during the 2015–16 NCAA Division I women's ice hockey season. They were coached by Brad Frost in his ninth season. The Golden Gophers advanced to the Frozen Four championship game for the fifth consecutive year and defeated Boston College 3–1 in the title game.

== Offseason ==
=== Recruiting ===
Player	Position	Nationality	Notes
Anna Barlow	Defense	United States	Competed at South St. Paul Secondary
Tianna Gunderson	Forward	United States	From Roseau High School
Emma May	Goaltender	United States	Hails from Eagan, Minnesota
Sarah Potomak	Forward	Canada	Competed with Canada at IIHF U18 Women's Worlds
Sophie Skarzynski	Defense	United States	Hails from Lake Forest, Illinois
Sierra Smith	Forward	United States	Competed with Stillwater Area High School
Taylor Williamson	Forward	United States	Played with Edina High School

=== Exhibition ===
- Sarah Potomak made her debut for the Minnesota Golden Gophers in a September 25, 2015, exhibition match against the Minnesota Whitecaps logging two assists on goals scored by Hannah Brandt as the squad prevailed by a 5–4 tally.

== Regular season ==
=== News and notes ===
- Sarah Potomak's regular season debut took place on October 1, 2015, in a 2–0 win against Penn State. Potomak scored an empty net goal, for the first goal of her NCAA career. In a two-game sweep of St. Cloud State on October 9–10, 2015, Potomak accumulated two goals and four assists. In the second game against St. Cloud, she logged the first multi-goal game of her NCAA career.
- An 11–1 win against the MSU-Mankato Mavericks in November 2015 saw Sarah Potomak tie the program record for most points in one game. She would register a seven-point output consisting two goals and five assists. Potomak was featured in Sports Illustrated’s Faces in the Crowd segment for the week of December 14, 2015.

=== Standings ===
2015–16 Western Collegiate Hockey Association standings
	Conference								Overall					
	GP	W	L	T	SW	PTS	GF	GA	GP	W	L	T	GF	GA
#3 Wisconsin*†	28	24	3	1	1	74	100	22	40	35	4	1	154	29
#1 Minnesota	28	24	3	1	0	73	139	39	40	35	4	1	187	51
#10 Bemidji State	28	17	9	2	1	54	56	51	36	22	11	3	77	68
#8 North Dakota	28	13	10	5	2	46	54	49	35	18	12	5	79	62
St. Cloud State	28	9	15	4	3	34	44	88	35	13	18	4	63	115
Minnesota Duluth	28	10	17	1	0	31	67	84	37	15	21	1	90	109
Ohio State	28	6	21	1	1	20	58	110	36	10	25	1	80	134
Minnesota State	28	0	25	3	0	3	41	116	36	3	29	4	55	137
Championship: Wisconsin † indicates conference regular season champion * indicates conference tournament champion Current rankings: USCHO.com Division I women's poll

=== Schedule ===
Date	Time	Opponent^{#}	Rank^{#}	Site	Decision	Result	Attendance	Record
Regular Season
October 1	6:00	at Penn State*	#1	Pegula Ice Arena • University Park, PA	Amanda Leveille	W 2–0	485	1–0–0
October 2	6:00	at Penn State*	#1	Pegula Ice Arena • University Park, PA	Sidney Peters	W 5–0	507	2–0–0
October 9	7:07	St. Cloud State	#1	Ridder Arena • Minneapolis, MN	Leveille	W 7–0	1,851	3–0–0 (1–0–0)
October 10	4:07	St. Cloud State	#1	Ridder Arena • Minneapolis, MN	Peters	W 11–0	2,335	4–0–0 (2–0–0)
October 16	5:07	at Ohio State	#1	Ohio State University Ice Rink • Columbus, OH	Leveille	W 7–2	465	5–0–0 (3–0–0)
October 17	1:07	at Ohio State	#1	Ohio State University Ice Rink • Columbus, OH	Leveille	W 11–2	575	6–0–0 (4–0–0)
October 23	6:07	Minnesota Duluth	#1	Ridder Arena • Minneapolis, MN	Leveille	W 5–2	1,685	7–0–0 (5–0–0)
October 24	4:07	Minnesota Duluth	#1	Ridder Arena • Minneapolis, MN	Leveille	W 6–1	1,965	8–0–0 (6–0–0)
October 29	7:07	at #7 North Dakota	#1	Ralph Engelstad Arena • Grand Forks, ND	Leveille	W 5–1	1,066	9–0–0 (7–0–0)
October 30	7:07	at #7 North Dakota	#1	Ralph Engelstad Arena • Grand Forks, ND	Leveille	L 3–4	3,361	9–1–0 (7–1–0)
November 13	7:07	#5 Bemidji State	#3	Ridder Arena • Minneapolis, MN	Leveille	W 4–0	1,957	10–1–0 (8–1–0)
November 14	4:07	#5 Bemidji State	#3	Ridder Arena • Minneapolis, MN	Leveille	W 8–3	2,148	11–1–0 (9–1–0)
November 20	7:07	Yale*	#3	Ridder Arena • Minneapolis, MN	Leveille	W 6–3	1,932	12–1–0
November 21	7:07	Yale*	#3	Ridder Arena • Minneapolis, MN	Peters	W 4–1	1,682	13–1–0
November 27	2:07	at Minnesota State	#3	Verizon Wireless Center • Mankato, MN	Leveille	W 11–1	313	14–1–0 (10–1–0)
November 28	2:07	at Minnesota State	#3	Verizon Wireless Center • Mankato, MN	Peters	W 2–1	152	15–1–0 (11–1–0)
December 4	7:07	at #1 Wisconsin	#3	LaBahn Arena • Madison, WI	Leveille	L 2–3 ^{OT}	2,273	15–2–0 (11–2–0)
December 5	3:07	at #1 Wisconsin	#3	LaBahn Arena • Madison, WI	Leveille	L 1–3	2,273	15–3–0 (11–3–0)
December 11	6:37	vs. St. Cloud State*	#3	John Rose Oval • Roseville, MN (Hall of Fame Game)	Leveille	W 7–0	1,078	16–3–0
January 9, 2016	2:07	Ohio State	#3	Ridder Arena • Minneapolis, MN	Leveille	W 3–1	2,431	17–3–0 (12–3–0)
January 10	2:07	Ohio State	#3	Ridder Arena • Minneapolis, MN	Leveille	W 9–0	1,677	18–3–0 (13–3–0)
January 16	2:07	Minnesota State	#3	Ridder Arena • Minneapolis, MN	Leveille	W 3–2	1,927	19–3–0 (14–3–0)
January 17	2:07	Minnesota State	#3	Ridder Arena • Minneapolis, MN	Peters	W 2–1	1,740	20–3–0 (15–3–0)
January 22	3:07	at St. Cloud State	#3	Herb Brooks National Hockey Center • St. Cloud, MN	Leveille	W 7–0	212	21–3–0 (16–3–0)
January 23	3:07	at St. Cloud State	#3	Herb Brooks National Hockey Center • St. Cloud, MN	Peters	W 4–2	243	22–3–0 (17–3–0)
January 29	7:07	at #7 Bemidji State	#3	Sanford Center • Bemidji, MN	Leveille	W 2–1	672	23–3–0 (18–3–0)
January 30	4:07	at #7 Bemidji State	#3	Sanford Center • Bemidji, MN	Leveille	W 2–1 ^{OT}	715	24–3–0 (19–3–0)
February 5	6:07	#8 North Dakota	#3	Ridder Arena • Minneapolis, MN	Leveille	W 3–0	2,635	25–3–0 (20–3–0)
February 6	4:07	#8 North Dakota	#3	Ridder Arena • Minneapolis, MN	Leveille	T 0–0 ^{OT}	2,678	25–3–1 (20–3–1)
February 12	7:07	at Minnesota Duluth	#3	AMSOIL Arena • Duluth, MN	Leveille	W 7–3	1,301	26–3–1 (21–3–1)
February 13	4:07	at Minnesota Duluth	#3	Amsoil Arena • Duluth, MN	Leveille	W 6–2	1,242	27–3–1 (22–3–1)
February 19	7:07	#2 Wisconsin	#3	Ridder Arena • Minneapolis, MN	Leveille	W 4–0	3,288	28–3–1 (23–3–1)
February 20	3:03	#2 Wisconsin	#3	Ridder Arena • Minneapolis, MN	Leveille	W 4–3 ^{OT}	3,091	29–3–1 (24–3–1)
WCHA Tournament
February 26	7:07	Ohio State*	#2	Ridder Arena • Minneapolis, MN (Quarterfinals, Game 1)	Leveille	W 5–2	1,335	30–3–1
February 27	4:07	Ohio State*	#2	Ridder Arena • Minneapolis, MN (Quarterfinals, Game 2)	Leveille	W 5–0	1,443	31–3–1
March 5	5:07	#8 North Dakota*	#2	Ridder Arena • Minneapolis, MN (Semifinal Game)	Leveille	W 2–0	2,233	32–3–1
March 6	2:07	#3 Wisconsin*	#2	Ridder Arena • Minneapolis, MN (WCHA Championship Game)	Leveille	L 0–1	1,855	32–4–1
NCAA Tournament
March 12	4:00	#7 Princeton*	#3	Ridder Arena • Minneapolis, MN (Quarterfinal Game)	Leveille	W 6–2	2,468	33–4–1
March 18	6:00	vs. #2 Wisconsin*	#3	Whittemore Center • Durham, NH (Frozen Four Semifinal Game)	Leveille	W 3–2 ^{OT}	2,167	34–4–1
March 20	1:00	vs. #1 Boston College*	#3	Whittemore Center • Durham, NH (National Championship Game)	Leveille	W 3–1	3,211	35–4–1
*Non-conference game. ^{#}Rankings from USCHO.com Poll.

=== Roster ===
No.	Nat.	Player	Class	Pos	Height	DoB	Hometown	Previous team
2		Lee Stecklein (C)	Junior	D	6' 0" (1.83 m)	1994-04-23	Roseville, Minnesota	Roseville Area High School
3		Anna Barlow	Freshman	D	5' 6" (1.68 m)	1996-09-02	South St. Paul, Minnesota	South St. Paul Secondary
4		Tianna Gunderson	Freshman	F	5' 6" (1.68 m)	1996-08-27	Roseau, Minnesota	Roseau High School
5		Sophie Skarzynski	Freshman	D	5' 8" (1.73 m)	1997-09-18	Lake Forest, Illinois	Loyola Academy
6		Kate Schipper	Junior	F	5' 4" (1.63 m)	1995-06-28	Brooklyn Park, Minnesota	Breck School
7		Taylor Williamson	Freshman	F	5' 7" (1.7 m)	1996-08-20	Edina, Minnesota	Edina High School
8		Amanda Kessel	Senior	F	5' 6" (1.68 m)	1991-08-28	Madison, Wisconsin	Shattuck-Saint Mary's
9		Sydney Baldwin	Sophomore	D	5' 7" (1.7 m)	1996-01-15	Minnetonka, Minnesota	Minnetonka High School
10		Cara Piazza	Sophomore	F	5' 7" (1.7 m)	1995-10-09	Darien, Illinois	Downers Grove South High School
11		Kelsey Cline	Junior	D/F	5' 6" (1.68 m)	1995-02-28	Bloomington, Minnesota	Bloomington Jefferson High School
12		Megan Wolfe	Junior	D	5' 8" (1.73 m)	1995-06-08	Eagan, Minnesota	Eagan High School
13		Milica McMillen	Senior	D	5' 10" (1.78 m)	1993-07-13	Saint Paul, Minnesota	Breck School
15		Paige Haley	Junior	D/F	5' 9" (1.75 m)	1995-07-21	Red Wing, Minnesota	Red Wing High School
17		Sierra Smith	Freshman	F	5' 8" (1.73 m)	1996-09-02	Stillwater, Minnesota	Stillwater Area High School
18		Brook Garzone	Senior	D/F	5' 6" (1.68 m)	1993-04-29	Sand Springs, Oklahoma	Shattuck-Saint Mary's
19		Kelly Pannek	Sophomore	F	5' 8" (1.73 m)	1995-12-29	Plymouth, Minnesota	Benilde-St. Margaret's
20		Nina Rodgers	Sophomore	F	5' 5" (1.65 m)	1996-04-08	Minnetonka, Minnesota	Hopkins High School
21		Dani Cameranesi	Junior	F	5' 5" (1.65 m)	1995-06-30	Plymouth, Minnesota	Blake School
22		Hannah Brandt (C)	Senior	F	5' 6" (1.68 m)	1993-11-27	Vadnais Heights, Minnesota	Hill-Murray School
23		Caitlin Reilly	Sophomore	F	5' 5" (1.65 m)	1995-09-05	Chanhassen, Minnesota	Benilde-St. Margaret's
25		Nicole Schammel	Sophomore	F	5' 5" (1.65 m)	1996-04-09	Red Wing, Minnesota	Red Wing High School
26		Sarah Potomak	Freshman	F	5' 5" (1.65 m)	1996-04-08	Aldergrove, British Columbia	George Eliot Secondary
29		Amanda Leveille	Senior	G	5' 7" (1.7 m)	1994-06-10	Kingston, Ontario	Frontenac Secondary School
31		Emma May	Freshman	G	5' 6" (1.68 m)	1996-10-21	Eagan, Minnesota	Eagan High School
37		Sidney Peters	Sophomore (RS)	G	5' 10" (1.78 m)	1995-02-26	Geneva, Illinois	North American Hockey Academy

=== NCAA ===
- Sarah Potomak, 2015–16 WCHA Preseason Rookie of the Year
- Sarah Potomak, WCHA Rookie of the Week (Week of October 13, 2015)
- Sarah Potomak, WCHA Player of the Week (Recognized for games of October 14–15, 2016)
- Sarah Potomak, WCHA Player of the Month (October 2016)
- Sarah Potomak, 2016 Women's Hockey Commissioners Association National Rookie of the Year Award
- Sarah Potomak, 2016 WCHA Rookie of the Year honors
- Sarah Potomak, Most Outstanding Player Award, 2016 NCAA National Collegiate Women's Ice Hockey Tournament
- Hannah Brandt, Forward, Patty Kazmaier Award Top 10 Finalist
- Dani Cameranesi, Forward, Patty Kazmaier Award Top 10 Finalist
- Dani Cameranesi, Forward, WCHA Scoring Leader
- Lee Stecklein, Defense, WCHA First Team All-Star
- Hannah Brandt, Forward, WCHA First Team All-Star
- Dani Cameranesi, Forward, WCHA First Team All-Star
- Milica McMillen, Defense, WCHA Second Team All-Star
- Sarah Potomak, Forward, WCHA Third Team All-Star
- Sarah Potomak, Forward, WCHA All-Rookie Team
