= 2015–16 Dartmouth Big Green women's ice hockey season =

- Conference: 10th ECAC Hockey
- Home ice: Thompson Arena

Record
- Overall: 6-19-3
- Home: 4-8-1
- Road: 2-11-2

Coaches and captains
- Head coach: Mark Hudak
- Assistant coaches: Holly Tyng; Josh Liegl
- Captain(s): Catherine Berghuis; Laura Stacey
- Alternate captain(s): Kennedy Ottenbreit; Eleni Tebano

The Dartmouth Big Green represented Dartmouth College in ECAC women's ice hockey during the 2015–16 NCAA Division I women's ice hockey season. Their tenth place ECAC finish broke a five-year streak of the Big Green making it to post-season play.

== Offseason ==
- August 18:For the third consecutive year, forward Laura Stacey was selected to Team Canada Development Team. As a member of the team she participated in a three-game series against Team USA in August, 2015, in Lake Placid, New York.

=== Recruiting ===
Player	Position	Nationality	Notes
Alyssa Baker	Forward	Canada	Played for Nepean Jr. Wildcats
Tess Bracken	Defense	Canada	Team Manitoba Blue-liner
Christie Honor	Goaltender	Canada	Tended goal for the Etobicoke Jr. Dolphins
Kate Landers	Forward	United States	Played for Chicago Mission
Shannon Ropp	Goaltender	United States	Two-time pick to attend Team USA Development Camp
Caroline Shaunessy	Defense	United States	Played for Bay State Breakers

== 2015–16 Big Green ==
No.	Nat.	Player	Class	Pos	Height	DoB	Hometown	Previous team
4		Zoe Brennan	Senior	D	5' 8" (1.73 m)		Calgary, Alberta	Edge School
7		Laura Stacey (C)	Senior	F	5' 11" (1.8 m)		Kleinburg, Ontario	Team Canada U22
8		Caroline Shaunessy	Freshman	D	5' 9" (1.75 m)		Duxbury, Massachusetts	Bay State Breakers
9		Eleni Tebano (A)	Junior	D	5' 6" (1.68 m)		Glastonbury, Connecticut	Westminster School
10		Morgan Turner	Sophomore	F	5' 8" (1.73 m)		Chicago, Illinois	Chicago Mission
11		Alyssa Baker	Freshman	F	5' 6" (1.68 m)		Ottawa, Ontario	Nepean Jr. Wildcats
12		MacKenzie St. Onge	Junior	F	5' 7" (1.7 m)		Stowe, Vermont	North American Hockey Academy
13		Catherine Berghuis (C)	Senior	F	5' 8" (1.73 m)		Truro, Nova Scotia	Mississauga Jr. Chiefs
14		Lindsey Allen	Senior	F	5' 10" (1.78 m)		Toronto, Ontario	Toronto Jr. Aeros
16		Hailey Noronha	Sophomore	D	5' 5" (1.65 m)		Newmarket, Ontario	Whitby Jr. Wolves
17		Tess Bracken	Freshman	D	5' 7" (1.7 m)		Winnipeg, Manitoba	Team Manitoba
18		Kennedy Ottenbreit (A)	Junior	F	5' 8" (1.73 m)		Grayson, Saskatchewan	Shattuck-St. Mary's
19		Devon Moir	Junior	F	5' 5" (1.65 m)		Toronto, Ontario	Toronto Jr. Aeros
20		Olivia Whitford	Senior	D	5' 7" (1.7 m)		Milton, Ontario	Burlington Jr. Barracudas
21		Brooke Ahbe	Sophomore	F	5' 8" (1.73 m)		Centennial, Colorado	Shattuck-St. Mary's
22		Kate Landers	Freshman	F	5' 5" (1.65 m)		Chicago, Illinois	Chicago Mission
23		Katy Ratty	Junior	F	5' 2" (1.57 m)		Northfield, Illinois	Chicago Mission
24		Emma Korbs	Junior	D	5' 6" (1.68 m)		Toronto, Ontario	Malvern HS
27		Ailish Forfar	Senior	F	5' 6" (1.68 m)		Sharon, Ontario	Toronto Jr. Aeros
29		Shannon Ropp	Freshman	G	5' 3" (1.6 m)		West Bloomfield, Michigan	Honeybaked U19
30		Robyn Chemago	Junior	G	5' 6" (1.68 m)		Slave Lake, Alberta	Roland Michner Secondary School
31		Christie Honor	Freshman	G	5' 8" (1.73 m)		Mississauga, Ontario	Etobicoke Jr. Dolphins

== 2015-16 Schedule ==
Date	Opponent^{#}	Rank^{#}	Site	Decision	Result	Record
Regular Season
October 23	#5 Harvard		Thompson Arena • Hanover, NH	Robyn Chemago	W 2–1	1–0–0 (1–0–0)
October 30	St. Lawrence	#10	Thompson Arena • Hanover, NH	Robyn Chemago	L 2–4	1–1–0 (1–1–0)
October 31	#4 Clarkson	#10	Thompson Arena • Hanover, NH	Robyn Chemago	T 3–3 ^{OT}	1–1–1 (1–1–1)
November 6	at Brown		Meehan Auditorium • Providence, RI	Robyn Chemago	W 4–0	2–1–1 (2–1–1)
November 7	at Yale		Ingalls Rink • New Haven, CT	Robyn Chemago	T 3–3 ^{OT}	2–1–2 (2–1–2)
November 10	Maine*		Thompson Arena • Hanover, NH	Christie Honor	T 1–4	2–2–2
November 13	Rensselaer		Thompson Arena • Hanover, NH	Robyn Chemago	W 4–0	3–2–2 (3–1–2)
November 14	Union		Thompson Arena • Hanover, NH	Robyn Chemago	W 2–0	4–2–2 (4–1–2)
November 27	at #1 Wisconsin*		LaBahn Arena • Madison, WI	Robyn Chemago	L 1–4	4–3–2
November 28	at #1 Wisconsin*		LaBahn Arena • Madison, WI	Robyn Chemago	L 0–4	4–4–2
December 4	at #4 Quinnipiac		TD Bank Sports Center • Hamden, CT	Robyn Chemago	L 1–7	4–5–2 (4–2–2)
December 5	at Princeton		Hobey Baker Memorial Rink • Princeton, NJ	Robyn Chemago	L 1–4	4–6–2 (4–3–2)
December 8	at New Hampshire*		Whittemore Center • Durham, NH	Robyn Chemago	L 2–3	4–7–2
December 12	Vermont*		Thompson Arena • Hanover, NH	Robyn Chemago	L 2–3	4–8–2
January 2, 2016	at #8 Northeastern*		Matthews Arena • Boston, MA	Robyn Chemago	L 2–5	4–9–2
January 8	#10 Colgate		Thompson Arena • Hanover, NH	Robyn Chemago	L 2–4	4–10–2 (4–4–2)
January 9	Cornell		Thompson Arena • Hanover, NH	Shannon Ropp	L 3–5	4–11–2 (4–5–2)
January 15	at #5 Clarkson		Cheel Arena • Potsdam, NY	Robyn Chemago	L 0–1	4–12–2 (4–6–2)
January 16	at St. Lawrence		Appleton Arena • Canton, NY	Robyn Chemago	T 2–2 ^{OT}	4–12–3 (4–6–3)
January 23	at Harvard		Bright-Landry Hockey Center • Allston, MA	Robyn Chemago	L 0–2	4–13–3 (4–7–3)
January 29	#9 Princeton		Thompson Arena • Hanover, NH	Robyn Chemago	L 1–4	4–14–3 (4–8–3)
January 30	#4 Quinnipiac		Thompson Arena • Hanover, NH	Robyn Chemago	L 1–2	4–15–3 (4–9–3)
February 5	Yale		Thompson Arena • Hanover, NH	Robyn Chemago	L 3–4 ^{OT}	4–16–3 (4–10–3)
February 6	Brown		Thompson Arena • Hanover, NH	Robyn Chemago	W 5–0	5–16–3 (5–10–3)
February 12	at Union		Achilles Center • Schenectady, NY	Robyn Chemago	W 3–1	6–16–3 (6–10–3)
February 13	at Rensselaer		Houston Field House • Troy, NY	Robyn Chemago	L 1–2	6–17–3 (6–11–3)
February 19	at Cornell		Lynah Rink • Ithaca, NY	Robyn Chemago	L 0–1	6–18–3 (6–12–3)
February 20	at Colgate		Starr Rink • Hamilton, NY	Christie Honor	L 0–1	6–19–3 (6–13–3)
*Non-conference game. ^{#}Rankings from USCHO.com Poll.

== Awards and honors ==
- Laura Stacey, F, All-ECAC Third Team
