= Rebekah Kolstad =

American ice hockey player

- Born: January 21, 1997 (age 29) Mankato, Minnesota, U.S.
- Height: 5 ft 10 in (178 cm)
- Weight: 185 lb (84 kg; 13 st 3 lb)
- Position: Forward
- Shoots: Left
- ZhHL team Former teams: Free agent KRS Vanke Rays
- National team: China
- Playing career: 2015–present

Li Beika
- Traditional Chinese: 麗貝卡
- Simplified Chinese: 丽贝卡
Transcriptions
Standard Mandarin
- Hanyu Pinyin: Lì Bèikǎ
Yue: Cantonese
- Yale Romanization: Laih Buikāat or Laih Buikā

Rebekah “Becky” Kolstad (born January 21, 1997), also known by the Chinese name Li Beika (simplified Chinese: 丽贝卡; traditional Chinese: 麗貝卡; pinyin: Lì Bèikǎ), is an American ice hockey forward who is currently an unrestricted free agent. She is a former member of the Chinese women's national ice hockey team that participated at the 2022 Winter Olympics and a former member of the KRS Vanke Rays.

She played four years of college ice hockey split between the University of North Dakota and Minnesota State University.

== Playing career ==
=== Early life ===
Kolstad is the daughter of Teresa and Blain Kolstad. She grew up in Mankato, Minnesota, and started playing hockey when she was four. She played six seasons with her high school hockey team, Mankato East High School, and accumulated 233 points.

=== College ===
Kolstad joined the Division I Fighting Hawks program as a freshman for the 2015–16 season. She skated in all 35 games and recorded 2 points and 26 penalty minutes. Her first assist came in her second game on October 3; an assist against RPI.

She found more offense in her sophomore season, finishing the 2016–17 season with 11 points (6 G, 5 A). Her penalty minutes also increased from 26 PIM the previous season to 45 PIM.

After the University of North Dakota abruptly ended its women's ice hockey program after the 2016–17 season, she joined the Minnesota State Mavericks women's ice hockey program in her hometown of Mankato, Minnesota for the 2017–18 and 2018–19 seasons. Kolstad saw her best offensive season in her senior year, recording 17 points in 35 games and she had a career high 70 shots on goal, and finishing second on the team in goals. She was named to the WCHA All-Academic team for both seasons with the Mavericks.

=== Professional ===
After graduation, Kolstad was convinced by Brian Idalski, her former University of North Dakota Coach, to sign a contract with the KRS Vanke Rays of the ZhHL, the Russian WHL, for the 2019–20 season. Following the collapse of the CWHL the Vanke Rays moved to the ZhHL.

The Vanke Rays won three games in a best-of-five series against HC Agidel Ufa, the two-time defending champions, to win the championship.

== International ==
Kolstad was named to Team China for the 2022 Beijing Olympics. where she recorded an assist in four games played. She recorded an assist on the tying goal against Japan and finished the tournament with 1 assist in 4 games. The teaam finished ninth overall.

== Personal life ==
In addition to playing on her high school hockey team, Kolstad was also on the soccer and softball teams. Her brother Isaac also played college football for North Dakota State and Minnesota state.

She was married in February 2025.

== Career statistics ==
=== Regular season and playoffs ===
			Regular season					Playoffs
Season	Team	League	GP	G	A	Pts	PIM	GP	G	A	Pts	PIM
2015–16	University of North Dakota	WCHA	35	0	2	2	26	—	—	—	—	—
2016–11	University of North Dakota	WCHA	38	6	5	11	45	—	—	—	—	—
2017–18	Minnesota State University	WCHA	38	17	20	37	8	—	—	—	—	—
2018–19	Minnesota State University	WCHA	35	10	7	17	24	—	—	—	—	—
2019–20	KRS Vanke Rays	ZhHL	27	8	5	13	42	5	1	0	1	4
NCAA totals			146	33	34	67	103	—	—	—	—	—
ZaHL totals			27	8	5	13	42	5	1	0	1	4

=== International ===
Year	Team	Event	Result	GP	G	A	Pts	PIM
2022	China	OG	9th	4	0	1	1	0
Senior totals				4	0	1	1	0

== Awards and honours ==
Award	Year(s)	Ref.
WCHA
WCHA All–Academic Award	2018	
WCHA All–Academic Award	2019	
