= 2015–16 Minnesota State Mavericks women's ice hockey season =

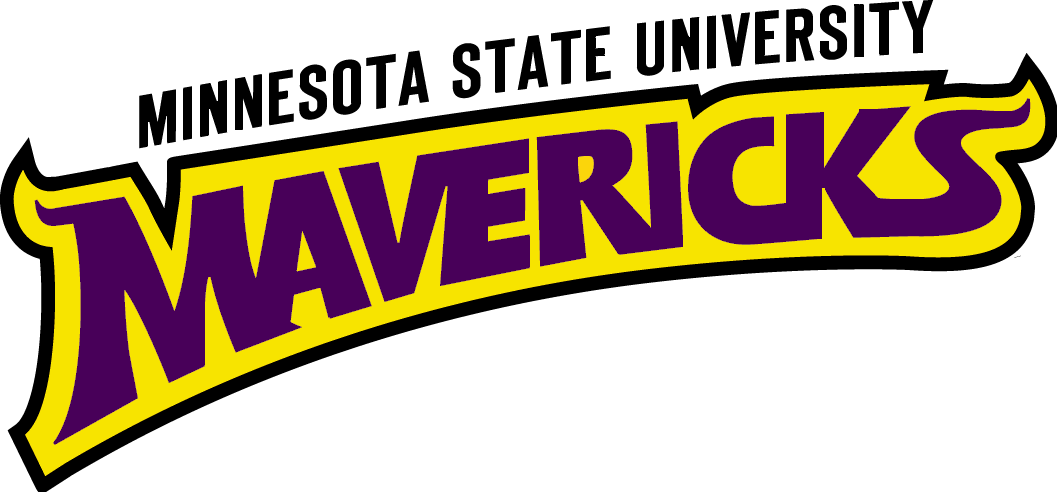
- Conference: WCHA
- Home ice: Verizon Wireless Center, Mankato, Minnesota

Record
- Overall: 3-29-4
- Home: 2-13-3
- Road: 1-16-1

Coaches and captains
- Head coach: John Harrington
- Assistant coaches: Jeff Giesen; Shari Dickerman
- Captain: Anna Fiegert

The Minnesota State Mavericks women's ice hockey program represented Minnesota State University, Mankato during the 2015-16 NCAA Division I women's ice hockey season.

== Recruiting ==
Player	Position	Nationality	Notes
Emily Antony	Forward	United States	Played for Minnesota Revolution
Megan Berg	Forward	United States	Teammate of Antony with Minnesota Revolution
Corbin Boyd	Forward	United States	Attended Hopkins (MN) HS
Julia Carle	Goaltender	United States	Went to Mennehaha (MN) HS
Lena Duesterhoeft	Defender	Germany	Formerly with ESC Planegg
Emily Harris	Forward	United States	Member of Boston Shamrocks
Megan Hinze	Defender	United States	Attended Chanhassen (MN) HS
Steph Keryluk	Forward	United States	Member of Madison Capitals
Leila Kilduff	Defender	United States	Attended North American Hockey Academy
Jordan McLaughlin	Forward	United States	Graduated from Greenway (MN) HS

== 2015–16 Mavericks ==
No.	Nat.	Player	Class	Pos	Height	DoB	Hometown	Previous team
1		Julia Carle	Freshman	G	5' 7" (1.7 m)		North St. Paul, Minnesota	Minnehaha United HS
3		Savannah Quandt	Junior	F	5' 9" (1.75 m)		Mankato, Minnesota	Mankato East HS
4		Emily Antony	Freshman	F	5' 6" (1.68 m)		Plymouth, Minnesota	Minnesota Revolution
5		Anna Keys	Sophomore	D	5' 8" (1.73 m)		Cottage Grove, Minnesota	Park HS
6		Jordan McLaughlin	Freshman	F	5' 8" (1.73 m)		Grand Rapids, Minnesota	Grand Rapids/Greenway HS
7		Lindsey Coleman	Sophomore	F	5' 8" (1.73 m)		Savage, Minnesota	Burnsville HS
8		Sara Bustad	Junior	D	5' 7" (1.7 m)		Stillwater, Minnesota	Stillwater HS
9		Megan Berg	Freshman	F	5' 7" (1.7 m)		Woodbury, Minnesota	Minnesota Revolution
10		Katie Johnson	Senior	F	5' 6" (1.68 m)		Anoka, Minnesota	Anoka HS
11		Corbin Boyd	Freshman	F	5' 6" (1.68 m)		Minnetonka, Minnesota	Hopkins HS
12		Anna-Maria Fiegert (C)	Junior	D	5' 9" (1.75 m)		Landshut, Germany	Scanlan Creek Academy
13		Leila Kilduff	Freshman	D	5' 4" (1.63 m)		San Jose, California	North American Hockey Academy
14		Victoria Løvdal	Sophomore	D	5' 8" (1.73 m)		Frederikstad, Norway	Norway National Team
15		Elin Johansson	Sophomore	F	5' 9" (1.75 m)		Hudiksvall, Sweden	Modo-Sweden
16		Steph Keryluk	Freshman	F	5' 5" (1.65 m)		Verona, Wisconsin	Madison Capitals
17		Hannah Davidson	Sophomore	F	5' 7" (1.7 m)		Kincardine, Ontario	Kitchener-Waterloo
18		Megan Hinze	Freshman	F	5' 5" (1.65 m)		Carver, Minnesota	Chaska-Chanhassen HS
19		Emily Stegora	Sophomore	F	5' 7" (1.7 m)		Red Wing, Minnesota	Red Wing HS
20		Emma Wittchow	Sophomore	D	5' 9" (1.75 m)		Burnsville, Minnesota	Burnsville HS
21		Emily Harris	Freshman	F	5' 4" (1.63 m)		Littleton, Colorado	Boston Shamrocks
23		Amanda Martin	Sophomore	F	5' 6" (1.68 m)		Peoria, Arizona	North American Hockey Academy
27		Lena Duesterhoeft	Freshman	D	5' 9" (1.75 m)		Munich, Germany	ESC Planegg
29		Amanda Conway	Sophomore	F	5' 5" (1.65 m)		Naperville, Illinois	Chicago Mission
30		Brianna Quade	Junior (RS)	G	5' 6" (1.68 m)		Newcastle, Ontario	Whitby
34		Katie Bidulka	Sophomore	G	5' 9" (1.75 m)		Oakville, Ontario	Brampton

== Schedule ==
Date	Opponent^{#}	Rank^{#}	Site	Decision	Result	Record
Regular season
September 25	Union*		All Seasons Arena • Mankato, MN	Brianna Quade	T 2–2 ^{OT}	0–0–1
September 26	Union*		All Seasons Arena • Mankato, MN	Brianna Quade	W 3–0	1–0–1
October 2	at RIT*		Gene Polisseni Center • Rochester, NY	Brianna Quade	L 1–2	1–1–1
October 3	at RIT*		Gene Polisseni Center • Rochester, NY	Brianna Quade	W 4–2	2–1–1
October 9	#6 North Dakota		Verizon Wireless Center • Mankato, MN	Brianna Quade	L 1–2	2–2–1 (0–1–0)
October 10	#6 North Dakota		Verizon Wireless Center • Mankato, MN	Brianna Quade	L 2–4	2–3–1 (0–2–0)
October 16	at Minnesota-Duluth		Amsoil Arena • Duluth, MN	Brianna Quade	L 2–4	2–4–1 (0–3–0)
October 17	at Minnesota-Duluth		Amsoil Arena • Duluth, MN	Brianna Quade	L 0–4	2–5–1 (0–4–0)
October 23	at Ohio State		OSU Ice Rink • Columbus, OH	Brianna Quade	L 3–5	2–6–1 (0–5–0)
October 24	at Ohio State		OSU Ice Rink • Columbus, OH	Katie Bidulka	L 0–4	2–7–1 (0–6–0)
October 30	#3 Wisconsin		Verizon Wireless Center • Mankato, MN	Brianna Quade	L 0–6	2–8–1 (0–7–0)
October 31	#3 Wisconsin		Verizon Wireless Center • Mankato, MN	Brianna Quade	L 0–7	2–9–1 (0–8–0)
November 13	at St. Cloud State		Herb Brooks National Hockey Center • St. Cloud, MN	Brianna Quade	L 1–4	2–10–1 (0–9–0)
November 14	at St. Cloud State		Herb Brooks National Hockey Center • St. Cloud, MN	Brianna Quade	L 2–4	2–11–1 (0–10–0)
November 20	at #6 Bemidji State		Sanford Center • Bemidji, MN	Brianna Quade	L 1–3	2–12–1 (0–11–0)
November 21	at #6 Bemidji State		Sanford Center • Bemidji, MN	Brianna Quade	L 1–3	2–13–1 (0–12–0)
November 27	#3 Minnesota		Verizon Wireless Center • Mankato, MN	Brianna Quade	L 1–11	2–14–1 (0–13–0)
November 28	#3 Minnesota		Verizon Wireless Center • Mankato, MN	Brianna Quade	L 1–2	2–15–1 (0–14–0)
January 3, 2016	Lindenwood*		Verizon Wireless Center • Mankato, MN	Brianna Quade	W 3–2	3–15–1
January 4	Lindenwood*		Verizon Wireless Center • Mankato, MN	Brianna Quade	L 1–3	3–16–1
January 8	St. Cloud State		Verizon Wireless Center • Mankato, MN	Brianna Quade	T 1–1 ^{OT}	3–16–2 (0–14–1)
January 9	St. Cloud State		Verizon Wireless Center • Mankato, MN	Brianna Quade	L 3–4 ^{OT}	3–17–2 (0–15–1)
January 16	at #3 Minnesota		Ridder Arena • Minneapolis, MN	Brianna Quade	L 2–3	3–18–2 (0–16–1)
January 16	at #3 Minnesota		Ridder Arena • Minneapolis, MN	Brianna Quade	L 1–2	3–19–2 (0–17–1)
January 22	Ohio State		Verizon Wireless Center • Mankato, MN	Brianna Quade	T 3–3 ^{OT}	3–19–3 (0–17–2)
January 23	Ohio State		Verizon Wireless Center • Mankato, MN	Brianna Quade	L 3–8	3–20–3 (0–18–2)
January 29	at North Dakota		Ralph Engelstad Arena • Grand Forks, ND	Brianna Quade	L 1–2	3–21–3 (0–19–2)
January 30	at North Dakota		Ralph Engelstad Arena • Grand Forks, ND	Katie Bidulka	T 5–5 ^{OT}	3–21–4 (0–19–3)
February 5	Minnesota-Duluth		Verizon Wireless Center • Mankato, MN	Brianna Quade	L 2–3 ^{OT}	3–22–4 (0–20–3)
February 6	Minnesota-Duluth		Verizon Wireless Center • Mankato, MN	Brianna Quade	L 2–5	3–23–4 (0–21–3)
February 13	at #2 Wisconsin		LaBahn Arena • Madison, WI	Brianna Quade	L 0–4	3–24–4 (0–22–3)
February 14	at #2 Wisconsin		LaBahn Arena • Madison, WI	Brianna Quade	L 1–8	3–25–4 (0–23–3)
February 19	#7 Bemidji State		Verizon Wireless Center • Mankato, MN	Brianna Quade	L 1–3	3–26–4 (0–24–3)
February 20	#7 Bemidji State		Verizon Wireless Center • Mankato, MN	Brianna Quade	L 1–2	3–27–4 (0–25–3)
WCHA tournament
February 26	at #3 Wisconsin*		LaBahn Arena • Madison, WI (Quarterfinals, Game 1)	Brianna Quade	L 0–4	3–28–4
February 27	at #3 Wisconsin*		LaBahn Arena • Madison, WI (Quarterfinals, Game 2)	Brianna Quade	L 0–6	3–29–4
*Non-conference game. ^{#}Rankings from USCHO.com Poll.
