= Gracen Hirschy =

American ice hockey player (born 1995)

- Born: April 4, 1995 (age 31) Fort Wayne, Indiana, US
- Height: 175 cm (5 ft 9 in)
- Weight: 72 kg (159 lb; 11 st 5 lb)
- Position: Defense
- Shot: Left
- Played for: Leksands IF; Linköping HC; Modo Hockey; Djurgårdens IF; North Dakota Fighting Hawks
- Current U16 coach: CGA Eagles U16
- Coached for: Aurora Spartans (asst.)
- Playing career: 2013–2022
- Coaching career: 2017–present

Gracen Hirschy (born April 4, 1995) is an American ice hockey defenceman and the current head coach of the Culver Girls Academy (CGA) Eagles under-16 ice hockey team. Her college ice hockey career was played with the North Dakota Fighting Hawks women's ice hockey program in the Western Collegiate Hockey Association (WCHA) conference of the NCAA Division I. She played more than four seasons in the Swedish Women's Hockey League (SDHL) with Djurgårdens IF Hockey Dam, MODO Hockey Dam, Linköping HC Dam, and Leksands IF Dam.

== Playing career ==
Hirschy scored 66 points in 145 NCAA Division I games with the North Dakota Fighting Hawks women's ice hockey program and was as an alternate captain in her senior season. She was named to the WCHA All-Rookie Team in her rookie season.

Following graduation, Hirschy served as a graduate assistant coach to the Spartans women's ice hockey program of Aurora University in the Northern Collegiate Hockey Association (NCHA) conference of the NCAA Division III during the 2017–18 season.

In early March 2018, she signed with Djurgårdens IF in Sweden, earning 3 points in the last 5 regular season games of the 2017–18 SDHL season. The next year, she opted to remain in Sweden and signed with Leksands IF. She put up 19 points in 34 games for Leksands, before leaving to join MODO Hockey for the 2019-20 season. For MODO, she scored another 19 points in 35 games, as the team finished last in the SDHL. She was suspended for one game following a collision with a referee.

In July 2020, Hirschy left MODO to sign with Linköping HC.

=== International ===
As a member of the United States national under-18 team, Hirschy participated in the 2013 IIHF U18 Women's World Championship, winning a silver medal.

== Personal life ==
Hirschy attended Culver Girls Academy in Culver, Indiana for all four years of high school and played on the school's ice hockey team.

She has a degree in political science from the University of North Dakota.

== Career statistics ==
			Regular season					Playoffs
Season	Team	League	GP	G	A	Pts	PIM	GP	G	A	Pts	PIM
2017-18	Djurgårdens IF	SDHL	5	2	1	3	2	4	0	0	0	0
2018-19	Leksands IF	SDHL	34	11	8	19	12	4	1	0	1	8
2019-20	MODO Hockey	SDHL	35	8	11	19	18	–	–	–	–	–
2020-21	Linköping HC	SDHL	36	5	7	12	20	2	0	0	0	0
2021-22	Leksands IF	SDHL	36	6	6	12	14	2	0	0	0	0
SDHL totals			146	32	33	65	66	12	1	0	1	8
