= 2015–16 Minnesota Duluth Bulldogs women's ice hockey season =

- Conference: 6th WCHA
- Home ice: Amsoil Arena

Record
- Overall: 15–21–1
- Home: 5–10–1
- Road: 10–10–0
- Neutral: 0–1–0

Coaches and captains
- Head coach: Maura Crowell
- Assistant coaches: Laura Bellamy; Sami Reber
- Captain: Ashleigh Brykaliuk
- Alternate captain: Sidney Morin

The Minnesota Duluth Bulldogs represented the University of Minnesota Duluth in WCHA women's ice hockey during the 2015-16 NCAA Division I women's ice hockey season. It was Maura Crowell's first season as UMD's head coach.

== Offseason ==
- July 16: Jessica Healey was named to the Team Canada Development Team, where she competed for a roster spot in the August, 2015 series against the US.

=== Recruiting ===
Player	Position	Nationality	Notes
Shelby Brossart	Defense	United States	Blue liner with Minnesota Revolution
Valerie Drouin	Defense	Canada	Played with the Limoilou Titans in Quebec
Reagan Haley	Forward	United States	Played with Team USA U18
Morgan Morse	Forward	United States	Attended Lakeville South (MN) High School
Maddie Rooney	Goaltender	United States	Haley's teammate on Team USA U18
Emma Yanko	Forward	Canada	Represented Team Saskatchewan

=== 2014–15 Bulldogs ===
No.	Nat.	Player	Class	Pos	Height	DoB	Hometown	Previous team
1		Kayla Black	Senior	G	5' 8" (1.73 m)		Blyth, Ontario	Team Canada U-18
5		Sidney Morin (A)	Junior	D	5' 5" (1.65 m)		Minnetonka, Minnesota	Team USA U-18
7		Morgan Morse	Freshman	F	5' 4" (1.63 m)		Lakeville, Minnesota	Lakeville South HS
12		Catherine Daoust	Sophomore	D	5' 5" (1.65 m)		L'Île-Bizard, Quebec	Team Canada U-18
13		Ashleigh Brykaliuk (C)	Junior	F	5' 7" (1.7 m)		Brandon, Manitoba	Team Canada U-18
15		Reagan Haley	Freshman	F	5' 7" (1.7 m)		Red Wing, Minnesota	Team USA U-18
16		Alexia Klaas	Sophomore	F	5' 2" (1.57 m)		Duluth, Minnesota	Northern Stars
17		Katherine McGovern	Junior	F	5' 4" (1.63 m)		Scottsdale, Arizona	Dallas Stars U-19
18		Valérie Drouin	Freshman	D	5' 5" (1.65 m)		Quebec City, Quebec	Limoilou Titans
21		Lara Stalder	Junior	F	5' 6" (1.68 m)		Lucerne, Switzerland	Swiss National Team
22		Emma Yanko	Freshman	F	5' 5" (1.65 m)		Saskatoon, Saskatchewan	Team Saskatchewan
22		Shelby Brossart	Freshman	D	5' 9" (1.75 m)		Grand Forks, North Dakota	Minnesota Revolution
24		Michela Cava	Senior	F	5' 4" (1.63 m)		Thunder Bay, Ontario	Connecticut
28		Demi Crossman	Junior	F	5' 7" (1.7 m)		Livonia, Michigan	Team USA U-18
29		Lynn Astrup	Sophomore	D	5' 7" (1.7 m)		Warroad, Minnesota	Warroad HS
34		Karissa Grapp	Senior	G	5' 5" (1.65 m)		Essexville, Michigan	Ohio Flames
35		Maddie Rooney	Freshman	G	5' 6" (1.68 m)		Andover, Minnesota	Team USA U-18
47		Jessica Healey	Sophomore	D	5' 3" (1.6 m)		Edmonton Alberta	Team Canada U-18
66		Maria Lindh	Sophomore	F	5' 9" (1.75 m)		Stockholm, Sweden	Team Sweden
67		Michelle Lowenhielm	Sophomore	F	5' 8" (1.73 m)		Sollentuna, Sweden	Swedish National Team
95		Linnea Hedin	Sophomore	D	5' 3" (1.6 m)		Huddinge, Sweden	Team Sweden
98		Katerina Mrázová	Junior	F	5' 5" (1.65 m)		Prague, Czech Republic	Boston Blades

== Schedule ==
Date	Opponent^{#}	Rank^{#}	Site	Decision	Result	Record
Regular Season
September 26	at Lindenwood*		Lindenwood Ice Arena • Wentzville, MO	Kayla Black	W 4–3 ^{OT}	1–0–0
September 27	at Lindenwood*		Lindenwood Ice Arena • Wentzville, MO	Kayla Black	W 4–1	2–0–0
October 2	at #2 Boston College*		Kelley Rink • Chestnut Hill, MA	Kayla Black	L 1–4	2–1–0
October 3	at #2 Boston College*		Kelley Rink • Chestnut Hill, MA	Maddie Rooney	L 2–4	2–2–0
October 9	at #9 Bemidji State		Sanford Center • Bemidji, MN	Kayla Black	L 0–2	2–3–0 (0–1–0)
October 10	at #9 Bemidji State		Sanford Center • Bemidji, MN	Maddie Rooney	L 1–2 ^{OT}	2–4–0 (0–2–0)
October 16	Minnesota State		Amsoil Arena • Duluth, MN	Maddie Rooney	W 4–2	3–4–0 (1–2–0)
October 17	Minnesota State		Amsoil Arena • Duluth, MN	Maddie Rooney	W 4–0	4–4–0 (2–2–0)
October 23	at #1 Minnesota		Ridder Arena • Minneapolis, MN	Maddie Rooney	L 2–5	4–5–0 (2–3–0)
October 24	at #1 Minnesota		Ridder Arena • Minneapolis, MN	Maddie Rooney	L 1–6	4–6–0 (2–4–0)
November 13	#1 Wisconsin		Amsoil Arena • Duluth, MN	Maddie Rooney	L 0–3	4–7–0 (2–5–0)
November 14	#1 Wisconsin		Amsoil Arena • Duluth, MN	Kayla Black	L 2–4	4–8–0 (2–6–0)
November 20	at #7 North Dakota		Ralph Engelstad Arena • Grand Forks, ND	Maddie Rooney	L 3–4	4–9–0 (2–7–0)
November 21	at #7 North Dakota		Ralph Engelstad Arena • Grand Forks, ND	Maddie Rooney	W 1–0	5–9–0 (3–7–0)
November 27	#8 Harvard*		Amsoil Arena • Duluth, MN	Maddie Rooney	W 4–2	6–9–0
November 28	#8 Harvard*		Amsoil Arena • Duluth, MN	Maddie Rooney	L 1–4	6–10–0
December 4	St. Cloud State		Amsoil Arena • Duluth, MN	Kayla Black	T 2–2 ^{OT}	6–10–1 (3–7–1)
December 5	St. Cloud State		Amsoil Arena • Duluth, MN	Kayla Black	W 4–0	7–10–1 (4–7–1)
December 11	at Ohio State		OSU Ice Rink • Columbus, OH	Maddie Ronney	W 4–2	8–10–1 (5–7–1)
December 12	at Ohio State		OSU Ice Rink • Columbus, OH	Kayla Black	W 5–2	9–10–1 (6–7–1)
January 8, 2016	at #2 Wisconsin		LaBahn Arena • Madison, WI	Maddie Rooney	L 1–5	9–11–1 (6–8–1)
January 10	at #2 Wisconsin		LaBahn Arena • Madison, WI	none	L 1–3	9–12–1 (6–9–1)
January 15	#8 North Dakota		Amsoil Arena • Duluth, MN	Karissa Grapp	L 1–2	9–13–1 (6–10–1)
January 16	#8 North Dakota		Amsoil Arena • Duluth, MN	Maddie Rooney	L 3–4 ^{OT}	9–14–1 (6–11–1)
January 22	#7 Bemidji State		Amsoil Arena • Duluth, MN	Kayla Black	L 2–3 ^{OT}	9–15–1 (6–12–1)
January 23	#7 Bemidji State		Amsoil Arena • Duluth, MN	Maddie Rooney	L 0–2	9–16–1 (6–13–1)
January 29	Ohio State		Amsoil Arena • Duluth, MN	Karissa Grapp	L 4–6	9–17–1 (6–14–1)
January 30	Ohio State		Amsoil Arena • Duluth, MN	Kayla Black	W 4–3	10–17–1 (7–14–1)
February 5	at Minnesota State		Verizon Wireless Center • Mankato, MN	Kayla Black	W 3–2 ^{OT}	11–17–1 (8–14–1)
February 6	at Minnesota State		Verizon Wireless Center • Mankato, MN	Kayla Black	W 5–2	12–17–1 (9–14–1)
February 12	#3 Minnesota		Amsoil Arena • Duluth, MN	Maddie Rooney	L 3–7	12–18–1 (9–15–1)
February 13	#3 Minnesota		Amsoil Arena • Duluth, MN	Kayla Black	L 2–6	12–19–1 (9–16–1)
February 19	at St. Cloud State		Herb Brooks National Hockey Center • St. Cloud, MN	Maddie Rooney	L 2–3	12–20–1 (9–17–1)
February 20	at St. Cloud State		Herb Brooks National Hockey Center • St. Cloud, MN	Kayla Black	W 3–2	13–20–1 (10–17–1)
WCHA Tournament
February 26	at #7 Bemidji State*		Sanford Center • Bemidji, MN (Quarterfinals, Game 1)	Kayla Black	W 5–1	11–17–1
February 27	at #7 Bemidji State*		Sanford Center • Bemidji, MN (Quarterfinals, Game 2)	Kayla Black	W 2–1	12–17–1
March 5	vs. #3 Wisconsin*		Ridder Arena • Minneapolis, MN (Semifinal Game)	Kayla Black	L 0–5	12–18–1
*Non-conference game. ^{#}Rankings from USCHO.com Poll.

== Awards and honors ==
- Ashleigh Brykaliuk
  WCHA Second Team All-Star
- Maddy Rooney
  Goaltender
  All-WCHA Rookie Team
