= 2015–16 Ohio State Buckeyes women's ice hockey season =

- Conference: 7th WCHA
- Home ice: OSU Ice Rink

Record
- Overall: 10-25-1
- Home: 4-12-0
- Road: 6-12-1
- Neutral: 0-1-0

Coaches and captains
- Head coach: Jenny Potter
- Assistant coaches: Joey Olson
- Captain: Melani Moylan
- Alternate captain(s): Julia McKinnon; Kendall Curtis

The Ohio State Buckeyes women's ice hockey program represented The Ohio State University during the 2015-16 NCAA Division I women's ice hockey season.

== Recruiting ==
Player	Position	Nationality	Notes
Lauren Boyle	Defender	United States	Attended Eden Prairie (MN) High School
Jincy Dunne	Defender	United States	Played for Team USA U18
Maddy Field	Forward	Canada	Member of the Oakville Jr. Hornets
Erin Langermeier	Forward	United States	Played with Connecticut South Stars
Dana Rasmussen	Forward	United States	Member of the Dodge City Wildcats

== Roster ==
=== 2015–16 Buckeyes ===
No.	Nat.	Player	Class	Pos	Height	DoB	Hometown	Previous team
2		Cara Zubko	Senior	D	5' 8" (1.73 m)		Preeceville, Saskatchewan	Pursuit of Excellence
5		Breanne Grant	Junior	D	5' 8" (1.73 m)		New Liskeard, Ontario	Toronto Aeros
6		Lauren Boyle	Freshman	D	5' 3" (1.6 m)		Eden Prairie, Minnesota	Eden Prairie HS
7		Dana Rasmussen	Freshman	F	5' 2" (1.57 m)		Kasson, Minnesota	Dodge City Wildcats
8		Dani Sadek	Sophomore	D	5' 9" (1.75 m)		Lakeville, Minnesota	Lakeville North HS
9		Bryanna Neuwald	Junior (RS)	F	5' 4" (1.63 m)		Oakville, Ontario	Aurora Jr. Panthers
10		Erin Langermeier	Freshman	F	5' 8" (1.73 m)		Westlake, Ohio	Connecticut South Stars
13		Jessica Dunne	Sophomore	D	6' 0" (1.83 m)		O'Fallon, Missouri	Chicago Fury
14		Maggie Rothgerie	Senior	F	5' 7" (1.7 m)		Elyria, Ohio	Mercyhurst
16		Melani Moylan (C)	Senior	F	5' 6" (1.68 m)		Mississauga, Ontario	Oakville Jr. Hornets
17		Julia McKinnon (A)	Senior	F	5' 9" (1.75 m)		Kelowna, British Columbia	Ontario Hockey Academy
18		Julianna Iaffalo	Sophomore	F	5' 8" (1.73 m)		Eden, New York	Buffalo Bison (WNYAHL)
21		Alexa Ranahan	Junior	D	5' 5" (1.65 m)		Salmon Run, British Columbia	Okanagan Hockey Academy
22		Maddy Field	Freshman	F	5' 8" (1.73 m)		Oakville, Ontario	Oakville Jr. Hornets
23		Katey Matheny	Junior	F	5' 8" (1.73 m)		Chesterfield, Missouri	St. Louis Lady Blues
24		Claudia Kepler	Junior	F	5' 4" (1.63 m)		Verona, Wisconsin	Madison Capitols
26		Kendall Curtis (A)	Senior	F	5' 7" (1.7 m)		Highlands Ranch, Colorado	Colorado Selects
27		Lauren Spring	Sophomore	F	5' 9" (1.75 m)		Kelowna, British Columbia	Pursuit of Excellence
30		Alex LaMere	Sophomore	G	5' 9" (1.75 m)		Albertville, Minnesota	North Wright County HS
32		Kassidy Suave	Sophomore	G	5' 9" (1.75 m)		Whitby, Ontario	Whitby Wolves
33		Jincy Dunne	Freshman	D	5' 6" (1.68 m)		O'Fallon, Missouri	St. Louis Lady Blues U19
39		Stacy Danczak	Senior (RS)	G	5' 6" (1.68 m)		Macedonia, Ohio	Ohio Flames

== Schedule ==
Date	Opponent^{#}	Rank^{#}	Site	Decision	Result	Record
Regular Season
October 2	at Lindenwood*		Lindenwood Ice Arena • Wentzville, MO	Stacy Danczak	W 5–1	1–0–0
October 3	at Lindenwood*		Lindenwood Ice Arena • Wentzville, MO	Alex LaMere	W 3–2	2–0–0
October 8	at #3 Wisconsin		LaBahn Arena • Madison, WI	Stacy Danczak	L 0–7	2–1–0 (0–1–0)
October 11	at #3 Wisconsin		LaBahn Arena • Madison, WI	Alex LaMere	L 0–8	2–2–0 (0–2–0)
October 16	#1 Minnesota		OSU Ice Rink • Columbus, OH	Stacy Danczak	L 2–7	2–3–0 (0–3–0)
October 17	#1 Minnesota		OSU Ice Rink • Columbus, OH	Alex LaMere	L 2–11	2–4–0 (0–4–0)
October 23	Minnesota State		OSU Ice Rink • Columbus, OH	Stacy Danczak	W 5–3	3–4–0 (1–4–0)
October 24	Minnesota State		OSU Ice Rink • Columbus, OH	Alex LaMere	W 4–0	4–4–0 (2–4–0)
November 6	#5 Bemidji State		OSU Ice Rink • Columbus, OH	Alex LaMere	L 1–2	4–5–0 (2–5–0)
November 7	#5 Bemidji State		OSU Ice Rink • Columbus, OH	Alex LaMere	L 1–3	4–6–0 (2–6–0)
November 14	at #6 North Dakota		Ralph Engelstad Arena • Grand Forks, ND	Alex LaMere	W 3–2	5–6–0 (3–6–0)
November 15	at #6 North Dakota		Ralph Engelstad Arena • Grand Forks, ND	Alex LaMere	L 1–4	5–7–0 (3–7–0)
November 20	at St. Cloud State		Herb Brooks National Hockey Center • St. Cloud, MN	Alex LaMere	L 2–3	5–8–0 (3–8–0)
November 21	at St. Cloud State		Herb Brooks National Hockey Center • St. Cloud, MN	Stacy Danczak	L 1–4	5–9–0 (3–9–0)
November 28	at Vermont*		Gutterson Fieldhouse • Burlington, VT (Windjammer Classic, Opening Game)	W 5–2	6–9–0	
November 29	vs. Boston University*		Gutterson Fieldhouse • Burlington, VT (Windjammer Classic, Championship Game)	L 3–5	6–10–0	
December 11	Minnesota-Duluth		OSU Ice Rink • Columbus, OH	Alex LaMere	L 2–4	6–11–0 (3–10–0)
December 12	Minnesota-Duluth		OSU Ice Rink • Columbus, OH	Stacy Danczak	L 2–5	6–12–0 (3–11–0)
January 2, 2016	Penn State*		OSU Ice Rink • Columbus, OH	Alex LaMere	W 2–1	7–12–0
January 3	Penn State*		OSU Ice Rink • Columbus, OH	Stacy Danczak	L 2–3	7–13–0
January 9	at #3 Minnesota		Ridder Arena • Minneapolis, MN	Alex LaMere	L 1–3	7–14–0 (3–12–0)
January 10	at #3 Minnesota		Ridder Arena • Minneapolis, MN	Alex LaMere	L 0–9	7–15–0 (3–13–0)
January 15	St. Cloud State		OSU Ice Rink • Columbus, OH	Alex LaMere	L 1–2	7–16–0 (3–14–0)
January 16	St. Cloud State		OSU Ice Rink • Columbus, OH	Alex LaMere	L 1–2	7–17–0 (3–15–0)
January 22	at Minnesota State		Verizon Wireless Center • Mankato, MN	Alex LaMere	T 3–3 ^{OT}	7–17–1 (3–15–1)
January 23	at Minnesota State		Verizon Wireless Center • Mankato, MN	Alex LaMere	W 8–3	8–17–1 (4–15–1)
January 29	at Minnesota-Duluth		Amsoil Arena • Duluth, MN	Alex LaMere	W 6–4	9–17–1 (5–15–1)
January 30	at Minnesota-Duluth		Amsoil Arena • Duluth, MN	Alex LaMere	L 3–4	9–18–1 (5–16–1)
February 5	#2 Wisconsin		OSU Ice Rink • Columbus, OH	Stacy Danczak	L 1–2	9–19–1 (5–17–1)
February 6	#2 Wisconsin		OSU Ice Rink • Columbus, OH	Alex LaMere	L 0–2	9–20–1 (5–18–1)
February 12	at #7 Bemidji State		Sanford Center • Bemidji, MN	Alex LaMere	L 1–3	9–21–1 (5–19–1)
February 13	at #7 Bemidji State		Sanford Center • Bemidji, MN	Stacy Danczak	L 2–6	9–22–1 (5–20–1)
February 19	#9 North Dakota		OSU Ice Rink • Columbus, OH	Alex LaMere	W 3–1	10–22–1 (6–20–1)
February 20	#9 North Dakota		OSU Ice Rink • Columbus, OH	Stacy Danczak	L 2–3	10–23–1 (6–21–1)
WCHA Tournament
February 26	at #2 Minnesota*		Ridder Arena • Minneapolis, MN (Quarterfinals, Game 1)	Alex LaMere	L 2–5	10–24–1
February 27	at #2 Minnesota*		Ridder Arena • Minneapolis, MN (Quarterfinals, Game 2)	Alex LaMere	L 0–5	10–25–1
*Non-conference game. ^{#}Rankings from USCHO.com Poll.
