= 2015–16 Bemidji State Beavers women's ice hockey season =

- Conference: 3rd WCHA
- Home ice: Sanford Center

Rankings
- USCHO.com: 10th
- USA Today/USA Hockey Magazine: 9th

Record
- Overall: 22–11–3
- Home: 11–7–2
- Road: 11–4–1

Coaches and captains
- Head coach: James Scanlan
- Assistant coaches: Amber Fryklund; Shane Veenker
- Captain: Hannah Moher
- Alternate captain(s): Stephanie Anderson; Ivana Bilic, Whitney Wivoda

The Bemidji State Beavers women's ice hockey program represented the Bemidji State University during the 2015-16 NCAA Division I women's ice hockey season.

== Offseason ==
- August 17: Assistant Captain Ivana Bilic was named to the Canadian U22 National Team

=== 2015–16 Beavers ===
No.	Nat.	Player	Class	Pos	Height	DoB	Hometown	Previous team
2		Reilly Fawcett	Sophomore	F	5' 4" (1.63 m)		Proctor, Minnesota	Proctor/Hermantown HS
4		Madison Hutchinson	Junior	D	5' 8" (1.73 m)		Manitou, Manitoba	Pembina Valley Hawks
5		Melissa Hunt	Freshman	D	5' 6" (1.68 m)		Hartney, Manitoba	Westman Wildcats
6		Kristen Huber	Senior	F	5' 11" (1.8 m)		Kelowna, British Columbia	Pursuit of Excellence
7		Carley Esse	Junior	D	5' 8" (1.73 m)		Cloquet, Minnesota	Cloquet HS
8		Megan Lushanko	Senior	F	5' 3" (1.6 m)		Chisago City, Minnesota	Chisago Lakes HS
9		Kaitlyn Tougas	Senior	F	5' 4" (1.63 m)		Thunder Bay, Ontario	Thunder Bay Queens
10		Emily Bergland	Freshman	F	5' 6" (1.68 m)		Thief River Falls, Minnesota	Lincoln HS
11		Whitney Wivoda (A)	Senior	F	5' 8" (1.73 m)		Fairbanks, Alaska	Lathrop HS
13		Sylvia Marolt	Freshman	F	5' 7" (1.7 m)		Thief River Falls, Minnesota	Lincoln HS
14		Lauren Miller	Junior	F	5' 7" (1.7 m)		Brockville, Ontario	Nepean Wildcats
15		Ciscely Nelson	Sophomore	F	5' 7" (1.7 m)		Roseau, Minnesota	Roseau HS
16		Stephanie Anderson (A)	Senior	F	5' 9" (1.75 m)		North St. Paul, Minnesota	Minnesota
17		Emma Terres	Sophomore	D	5' 8" (1.73 m)		New Hope, Minnesota	Armstrong-Cooper HS
18		Lisa Laiti	Freshman	D	5' 8" (1.73 m)		Fairbanks, Alaska	Northern Junior Cyclones
21		Tegan Rose	Freshman	D	5' 5" (1.65 m)		Gibbons, Alberta	Edmonton Chimos
22		Alexis Joyce	Sophomore	D	5' 4" (1.63 m)		Lakeville, Minnesota	Lakeville North HS
23		Ivana Bilic (A)	Senior	D	5' 6" (1.68 m)		Coquitlam, British Columbia	Warner Hockey Academy
24		Summer Thibodeau	Sophomore	F	5' 7" (1.7 m)		Maple Grove, Minnesota	Maple Grove HS
25		Alex Bond	Sophomore	F/D	5' 10" (1.78 m)		Barrie, Ontario	Barrie Jr. Sharks
27		Natalie Stanwood	Freshman	D	5' 4" (1.63 m)		West Vancouver, British Columbia	Warner Hockey Academy
28		Bailey Wright	Sophomore	F	5' 6" (1.68 m)		Anchorage, Alaska	Minnesota Duluth (WCHA)
29		Brittni Mowat	Junior	G	5' 6" (1.68 m)		Glenboro, Manitoba	Pembina Valley Hawks
30		Erin Deters	Sophomore	G	5' 7" (1.7 m)		Sartell, Minnesota	Sartell/Sauk Rapids HS
33		Mackenzie Bruch	Senior	G	5' 6" (1.68 m)		Barrie, Ontario	Stevenson University
56		Hannah Moher (C)	Senior	F	5' 6" (1.68 m)		Milton, Ontario	Mississauga Jr, Chiefs

== Schedule ==
Date	Opponent^{#}	Rank^{#}	Site	Decision	Result	Record
Regular Season
September 25	Robert Morris*	#9	Sanford Center • Bemidji, MN	Brittni Mowat	W 3–1	1–0–0
September 26	Robert Morris*	#9	Sanford Center • Bemidji, MN	Erin Deters	T 4–4 ^{OT}	1–0–1
October 2	at Vermont*	#9	Gutterson Fieldhouse • Burlington, VT	Brittni Mowat	W 2–1	2–0–1
October 3	at Vermont*	#9	Gutterson Fieldhouse • Burlington, VT	Brittni Mowat	W 3–0	3–0–1
October 9	Minnesota Duluth	#9	Sanford Center • Bemidji, MN	Brittni Mowat	W 2–0	4–0–1 (1–0–0)
October 10	Minnesota Duluth	#9	Sanford Center • Bemidji, MN	Brittni Mowat	W 2–1 ^{OT}	5–0–1 (2–0–0)
October 16	#6 North Dakota	#8	Sanford Center • Bemidji, MN	Brittni Mowat	T 0–0 ^{OT}	5–0–2 (2–0–1)
October 17	at #6 North Dakota	#8	Ralph Engelstad Arena • Grand Forks, ND	Brittni Mowat	W 2–1 ^{OT}	6–0–2 (3–0–1)
October 23	at #3 Wisconsin	#6	LaBahn Arena • Madison, WI	Brittni Mowat	L 0–3	6–1–2 (3–1–1)
October 24	at #3 Wisconsin	#6	LaBahn Arena • Madison, WI	Brittni Mowat	L 0–4	6–2–2 (3–2–1)
October 30	St. Cloud State	#6	Sanford Center • Bemidji, MN	Brittni Mowat	W 3–1	7–2–2 (4–2–1)
October 31	St. Cloud State	#6	Sanford Center • Bemidji, MN	Brittni Mowat	W 3–1	8–2–2 (5–2–1)
November 6	at Ohio State	#6	OSU Ice Rink • Columbus, OH	Brittni Mowat	W 2–1	9–2–2 (6–2–1)
November 7	at Ohio State	#6	OSU Ice Rink • Columbus, OH	Brittni Mowat	W 3–1	10–2–2 (7–2–1)
November 13	at #3 Minnesota	#5	Ridder Arena • Minneapolis, MN	Brittni Mowat	L 0–4	10–3–2 (7–3–1)
November 14	at #3 Minnesota	#5	Ridder Arena • Minneapolis, MN	Brittni Mowat	L 3–8	10–4–2 (7–4–1)
November 20	Minnesota State	#6	Sanford Center • Bemidji, MN	Brittni Mowat	W 3–1	11–4–2 (8–4–1)
November 21	Minnesota State	#6	Sanford Center • Bemidji, MN	Brittni Mowat	W 3–1	12–4–2 (9–4–1)
December 4	North Dakota	#6	Sanford Center • Bemidji, MN	Brittni Mowat	L 0–1	12–5–2 (9–5–1)
December 6	North Dakota	#6	Ralph Engelstad Arena • Grand Forks, ND	Brittni Mowat	W 1–0	13–5–2 (10–5–1)
January 6, 2016	Lindenwood*	#6	Sanford Center • Bemidji, MN	Brittni Mowat	W 2–1	14–5–2
January 7	Lindenwood*	#6	Sanford Center • Bemidji, MN	Brittni Mowat	W 5–3	15–5–2
January 15	#2 Wisconsin	#6	Sanford Center • Bemidji, MN	Brittni Mowat	L 0–1	15–6–2 (10–6–1)
January 16	#2 Wisconsin	#6	Sanford Center • Bemidji, MN	Brittni Mowat	L 1–7	15–7–2 (10–7–1)
January 22	at Minnesota Duluth	#7	AMSOIL Arena • Duluth, MN	Brittni Mowat	W 3–2	16–7–2 (11–7–1)
January 23	at Minnesota Duluth	#7	AMSOIL Arena • Duluth, MN	Brittni Mowat	W 2–0	17–7–2 (12–7–1)
January 29	#3 Minnesota	#7	Sanford Center • Bemidji, MN	Brittni Mowat	L 1–2	17–8–2 (12–8–1)
January 30	#3 Minnesota	#7	Sanford Center • Bemidji, MN	Brittni Mowat	L 1–2 ^{OT}	17–9–2 (12–9–1)
February 5	at St. Cloud State	#7	Herb Brooks National Hockey Center • St. Cloud, MN	Brittni Mowat	T 3–3 ^{OT}	17–9–3 (12–9–2)
February 6	at St. Cloud State	#7	Herb Brooks National Hockey Center • St. Cloud, MN	Brittni Mowat	W 4–1	18–9–3 (13–9–2)
February 12	Ohio State	#7	Sanford Center • Bemidji, MN	Brittni Mowat	W 3–1	19–9–3 (14–9–2)
February 13	Ohio State	#7	Sanford Center • Bemidji, MN	Brittni Mowat	W 6–2	20–9–3 (15–9–2)
February 19	at Minnesota State	#7	Verizon Wireless Center • Mankato, MN	Brittni Mowat	W 3–1	21–9–3 (16–9–2)
February 20	at Minnesota State	#7	Verizon Wireless Center • Mankato, MN	Brittni Mowat	W 2–1	22–9–3 (17–9–2)
WCHA Tournament
February 26	Minnesota Duluth	#7	Sanford Center • Bemidji, MN (Quarterfinals, Game 1)	Brittni Mowat	L 1–5	22–10–3
February 27	Minnesota Duluth	#7	Sanford Center • Bemidji, MN (Quarterfinals, Game 2)	Brittni Mowat	L 1–2 ^{OT}	22–11–3
*Non-conference game. ^{#}Rankings from USCHO.com Poll.

== Awards and honors ==
- Ivana Bilic, WCHA Defensive Player of the Year
- Brittni Mowat, G, All-WCHA Second Team
- Ivana Bilic, D, All-WCHA Third Team
- Melissa Hunt, D, All-WCHA Rookie Team
