= 2015–16 St. Cloud State Huskies women's ice hockey season =

- Conference: 5th WCHA
- Home ice: Herb Brooks National Hockey Center

Record
- Overall: 13–18–4
- Home: 5–7–2
- Road: 8–10–2
- Neutral: 0–1–0

Coaches and captains
- Head coach: Eric Rud
- Assistant coaches: Steve MacDonald; Jinelle Siergiej
- Captain: Vanessa Spataro
- Alternate captain(s): Molly Illikainen; Lauren Hespenheide

The St. Cloud State Huskies women's ice hockey program represented St. Cloud State University during the 2015-16 NCAA Division I women's ice hockey season.

== Recruiting ==
Player	Position	Nationality	Notes
Taylor Crosby	Goaltender	Canada	Sister of NHL Star Sid Crosby
Madeleine Dahl	Goaltender	United States	Transfer from Union College
Ivy Dynek	Forward	United States	Played with Julia Tylke on Chicago Young Americans
Megan Lalor	Forward	Canada	Played for the St. Albert Slash in Alberta
Suvi Ollikainen	Forward	Finland	Member of Finnish National Team
Hannah Potrykus	Forward	United States	Attended Hartland (MI) HS
Julia Tylke	Forward	United States	Played with Chicago Young Americans

== 2015–16 Huskies ==
No.	Nat.	Player	Class	Pos	Height	DoB	Hometown	Previous team
2		Julia Tylke	Freshman	F	5' 5" (1.65 m)		Delafield, Wisconsin	Chicago Young Americans
5		Hannah Brodt	Senior	F	5' 4" (1.63 m)		Roseville, Minnesota	Roseville HS
7		Brittney Anderson	Sophomore	D	5' 6" (1.68 m)		Hudson, Wisconsin	Hill-Murray HS
9		Lauren Hespenheide (A)	Junior	F	5' 0" (1.52 m)		Shakopee, Minnesota	Shakopee Senior HS
10		Emma Turbyville	Sophomore	D	5' 10" (1.78 m)		Chicago, Illinois	Shattuck St. Mary's
11		Caroline Markstrom	Sophomore	D	5' 8" (1.73 m)		Kovland, Sweden	Sundsvalls Gymnasium
12		Molly Illikainen (A)	Senior	F	5' 9" (1.75 m)		Grand Rapids, Minnesota	Providence
15		Lexi Slattery	Senior	D			Hugo, Minnesota	Providence
16		Vanessa Spataro (C)	Senior	F	5' 5" (1.65 m)		Stouffville, Ontario	Toronto Jr. Aeros
17		Jenna Redford	Junior (RS)	D	5' 6" (1.68 m)		Soldotna, Alaska	Boston Shamrocks
18		Kelsey Saelens	Junior	F	5' 7" (1.7 m)		Winnipeg, Manitoba	Shaftesbury Prep
19		Paige Pena	Junior	F	5' 7" (1.7 m)		Maple Ridge, British Columbia	Okanagan Hockey Academy
20		Suvi Ollikainen	Freshman	F	5' 3" (1.6 m)		Klaukkala, Finland	Finnish National Team
21		Christa Moody	Junior	D	5' 9" (1.75 m)		Battle Creek, Michigan	Honeybaked
23		Hannah Potrykus	Freshman	F	5' 6" (1.68 m)		Brighton, Michigan	USA Hockey Club of Michigan
24		Alex Makaric	Junior	D	5' 11" (1.8 m)		Windsor, Ontario	Cambridge Rivulettes
25		Jordan Stewart	Freshman	F	5' 5" (1.65 m)		Machesney Park, Illinois	Chicago Young Americans
27		Alyssa Erickson	Sophomore	F	5' 8" (1.73 m)		Mission, British Columbia	Okanagan Hockey Academy
29		Taylor Crosby	Freshman	G	5' 6" (1.68 m)		Cole Harbour, Nova Scotia	Shattuck-St. Mary's
33		Ivy Dynek	Freshman	F	5' 8" (1.73 m)		Northfield, Illinois	Chicago Young Americans
34		Madeleine Dahl	Junior	G	5' 7" (1.7 m)		Edina, Minnesota	Union College
35		Katie Fitzgerald	Senior	G	5' 11" (1.8 m)		Des Plaines, Illinois	Chicago Mission AAA

== Schedule ==
Date	Opponent^{#}	Rank^{#}	Site	Decision	Result	Record
Regular Season
October 2	at Merrimack*		Volpe Complex • North Andover, MA	Katie Fitzgerald	W 6–4	1–0–0
October 3	at Merrimack*		Volpe Complex • North Andover, MA	Taylor Crosby	W 6–2	2–0–0
October 9	at #1 Minnesota		Ridder Arena • Minneapolis, MN	Katie Fitzgerald	L 0–7	2–1–0 (0–1–0)
October 10	at #1 Minnesota		Ridder Arena • Minneapolis, MN	Katie Fitzgerald	L 0–11	2–2–0 (0–2–0)
October 16	#2 Wisconsin		Herb Brooks National Hockey Center • St. Cloud, MN	Katie Fitzgerald	L 0–5	2–3–0 (0–3–0)
October 17	#2 Wisconsin		Herb Brooks National Hockey Center • St. Cloud, MN	Katie Fitzgerald	L 0–2	2–4–0 (0–4–0)
October 23	#7 North Dakota		Herb Brooks National Hockey Center • St. Cloud, MN	Katie Fitzgerald	L 0–3	2–5–0 (0–5–0)
October 24	#7 North Dakota		Herb Brooks National Hockey Center • St. Cloud, MN	Katie Fitzgerald	T 4–4 ^{OT}	2–5–1 (0–5–1)
October 30	at #6 Bemidji State		Sanford Center • Bemidji, MN	Katie Fitzgerald	L 1–3	2–6–1 (0–6–1)
October 31	at #6 Bemidji State		Sanford Center • Bemidji, MN	Katie Fitzgerald	L 1–3	2–7–1 (0–7–1)
November 13	Minnesota State		Herb Brooks National Hockey Center • St. Cloud, MN	Katie Fitzgerald	W 4–1	3–7–1 (1–7–1)
November 14	Minnesota State		Herb Brooks National Hockey Center • St. Cloud, MN	Katie Fitzgerald	W 4–2	4–7–1 (2–7–1)
November 20	Ohio State		Herb Brooks National Hockey Center • St. Cloud, MN	Katie Fitzgerald	W 3–2	5–7–1 (3–7–1)
November 21	Ohio State		Herb Brooks National Hockey Center • St. Cloud, MN	Katie Fitzgerald	W 4–1	6–7–1 (4–7–1)
November 28	at Lindenwood*		Lindenwood Ice Arena • Wentzville, MO	Katie Fitzgerald	W 2–0	7–7–1
November 29	at Lindenwood*		Lindenwood Ice Arena • Wentzville, MO	Katie Fitzgerald	W 3–2	8–7–1
December 4	at #10 Minnesota-Duluth		Amsoil Arena • Duluth, MN	Katie Fitzgerald	T 2–2 ^{OT}	8–7–2 (4–7–2)
December 5	at #10 Minnesota-Duluth		Amsoil Arena • Duluth, MN	Katie Fitzgerald	L 0–4	8–8–2 (4–8–2)
December 11	vs. #3 Minnesota*		John Rose Oval • Roseville, MN (Hall of Fame Game)	Katie Fitzgerald	L 0–7	8–9–2
January 8, 2016	at Minnesota State		Verizon Wireless Center • Mankato, MN	Katie Fitzgerald	T 1–1 ^{OT}	8–9–3 (4–8–3)
January 9	at Minnesota State		Verizon Wireless Center • Mankato, MN	Katie Fitzgerald	W 4–3 ^{OT}	9–9–3 (5–8–3)
January 15	at Ohio State		OSU Ice Rink • Columbus, OH	W 2–1	10–9–3 (6–8–3)	
January 16	at Ohio State		OSU Ice Rink • Columbus, OH	Katie Fitzgerald	W 2–1	11–9–3 (7–8–3)
January 22	#3 Minnesota		Herb Brooks National Hockey Center • St. Cloud, MN	Katie Fitzgerald	L 0–7	11–10–3 (7–9–3)
January 23	#3 Minnesota		Herb Brooks National Hockey Center • St. Cloud, MN	Katie Fitzgerald	L 2–4	11–11–3 (7–10–3)
January 30	at #2 Wisconsin		LaBahn Arena • Madison, WI	Katie Fitzgerald	L 0–3	11–12–3 (7–11–3)
January 31	at #2 Wisconsin		LaBahn Arena • Madison, WI	Katie Fitzgerald	L 0–3	11–13–3 (7–12–3)
February 5	#7 Bemidji State		Herb Brooks National Hockey Center • St. Cloud, MN	Katie Fitzgerald	T 3–3 ^{OT}	11–13–4 (7–12–4)
February 6	#7 Bemidji State		Herb Brooks National Hockey Center • St. Cloud, MN	Katie Fitzgerald	L 1–4	11–14–4 (7–13–4)
February 12	at #9 North Dakota		Ralph Engelstad Arena • Grand Forks, ND	Katie Fitzgerald	W 1–0	12–14–4 (8–13–4)
February 13	at #9 North Dakota		Ralph Engelstad Arena • Grand Forks, ND	Katie Fitzgerald	L 0–3	12–15–4 (8–14–4)
February 19	Minnesota-Duluth		Herb Brooks National Hockey Center • St. Cloud, MN	Katie Fitzgerald	W 3–2	13–15–4 (9–14–4)
February 20	Minnesota-Duluth		Herb Brooks National Hockey Center • St. Cloud, MN	Katie Fitzgerald	L 2–3	13–16–4 (9–15–4)
WCHA Tournament
February 26	at North Dakota*		Ralph Engelstad Arena • Grand Forks, ND (Quarterfinals, Game 1)	Katie Fitzgerald	L 1–6 ^{8}	13–17–4
February 27	at #8 North Dakota*		Ralph Engelstad Arena • Grand Forks, ND (Quarterfinals, Game 2)	Katie Fitzgerald	L 1–6	13–18–4
*Non-conference game. ^{#}Rankings from USCHO.com Poll.

== Awards and honors ==
- Molly Illikainen, Forward, WCHA Third Team All-Star
- Julia Tylke, Forward, WCHA All-Rookie Team
