= 2015–16 Wisconsin Badgers women's ice hockey season =

WCHA Regular Season Champions WCHA Final Face-Off Champions Defeated Mercyhurst in Opening Round 6-0, Frozen Four Lost to Minnesota 2-3 in Overtime
- Conference: 1st WCHA
- Home ice: LaBahn Arena

Rankings
- USA Today/USA Hockey Magazine: 3rd
- USCHO.com/CBS College Sports: 3rd

Record
- Overall: 35-4-1
- Home: 21-0-0
- Road: 10-3-1
- Neutral: 4-1-0

Coaches and captains
- Head coach: Mark Johnson
- Assistant coaches: Dan Koch; Jackie Crum
- Captain: Courtney Burke
- Alternate captain(s): Sydney McKibbon; Jenny Ryan

The Wisconsin Badgers represented the University of Wisconsin in WCHA women's ice hockey during the 2015-16 NCAA Division I women's ice hockey season. The Badgers were unable to win the NCAA tournament for the fifth time in school history.

== Offseason ==
=== Recruiting ===
Player	Position	Nationality	Notes
Mikaela Gardner	Defense	United States	Hails from Illinois
Samantha Cogan	Forward	Canada	Competed with Canada at IIHF U18 Women’s Worlds
Sophia Shaver	Forward	United States	Played high school hockey in Minnesota

== Roster ==
=== 2015–16 Badgers ===
No.	Nat.	Player	Class	Pos	Height	DoB	Hometown	Previous team
1		Jorie Walters	Senior	G	5' 4" (1.63 m)		Grinnell, Iowa	Shattuck St. Mary's
2		Mellissa Channell	Junior	D	5' 4" (1.63 m)		Oakville, Ontario	Team Canada U18
3		Mikaela Gardner	Freshman	D	5' 8" (1.73 m)		Plainfield, Illinois	Team USA U18
5		Jenny Ryan (A)	Junior	D	5' 4" (1.63 m)		Victor, New York	Team USA U18
6		Courtney Burke (C)	Senior	D	5' 9" (1.75 m)		Albany, New York	Shattuck St. Mary's
7		Sam Cogan	Freshman	F	5' 8" (1.73 m)		Ottawa, Ontario	Team Canada U18
8		Katie Harding	Senior	F	5' 7" (1.7 m)		Anchorage, Alaska	Pursuit of Excellence
9		Molly Doner	Senior	F	5' 5" (1.65 m)		Mukilteo, Washington	North American Hockey Academy
10		Mikayla Johnson	Junior (RS)	F	5' 7" (1.7 m)		Madison, Wisconsin	Madison Capitols U19
11		Sydney McKibbon (A)	Junior	F	5' 5" (1.65 m)		Oakville, Ontario	Team Canada U18
12		Sophia Shaver	Freshman	F	5' 10" (1.78 m)		Wayzata, Minnesota	Team USA U18
13		Maddie Rolfes	Sophomore	D	5' 8" (1.73 m)		West Des Moines, Iowa	Team USA U18
16		Sarah Nurse	Junior	F	5' 8" (1.73 m)		Hamilton, Ontario	Stoney Creek Jr. Sabres
17		Lauren Williams	Sophomore	D	5' 9" (1.75 m)		Windsor, Ontario	Team Ontario Blue U18
19		Annie Pankowski	Sophomore	F	5' 9" (1.75 m)		Laguna Hills, California	Irondale HS
21		Baylee Wellhausen	Sophomore	F	5' 4" (1.63 m)		Williams Bay, Wisconsin	Shattuck St. Mary's
23		Kim Drake	Senior	F/D	5' 10" (1.78 m)		Mosinee, Wisconsin	Shattuck St. Mary's
25		Erika Sowchuk	Senior	F	5' 7" (1.7 m)		Fernie, British Columbia	Edge School
26		Emily Clark	Sophomore	F	5' 7" (1.7 m)		Saskatoon, Saskatchewan	Okanagan Hockey Academy
27		Rachel Jones	Senior	F	5' 6" (1.68 m)		Berlin, Wisconsin	Madison Capitols U19
30		Ann-Renee Desbiens	Junior	G	5' 9" (1.75 m)		La Malbaie, Quebec	Team Canada U22
32		Megan Miller	Senior (RS)	G	5' 7" (1.7 m)		Long Grove, Illinois	Boston College
35		Nali Mullen	Sophomore (RS)	G	5' 4" (1.63 m)		Hudson, Wisconsin	Hudson HS

== 2015-16 Schedule ==
Date	Opponent^{#}	Rank^{#}	Site	Decision	Result	Record
Regular Season
October 2	vs. Providence*	#3	Shark Ice • San Jose, CA	Ann-Renée Desbiens	W 5–1	1–0–0
October 3	vs. Providence*	#3	Shark Ice • San Jose, CA	Ann-Renée Desbiens	W 8–1	2–0–0
October 10	Ohio State	#3	LaBahn Arena • Madison, WI	Ann-Renée Desbiens	W 7–0	3–0–0 (1–0–0)
October 11	Ohio State	#3	LaBahn Arena • Madison, WI	Ann-Renée Desbiens	W 8–0	4–0–0 (2–0–0)
October 16	at St. Cloud State	#2	Herb Brooks National Hockey Center • St. Cloud, MN	Ann-Renée Desbiens	W 5–0	5–0–0 (3–0–0)
October 17	at St. Cloud State	#2	Herb Brooks National Hockey Center • St. Cloud, MN	Megan Miller	W 2–0	6–0–0 (4–0–0)
October 23	#6 Bemidji State	#3	LaBahn Arena • Madison, WI	Ann-Renée Desbiens	W 3–0	7–0–0 (5–0–0)
October 24	#6 Bemidji State	#3	LaBahn Arena • Madison, WI	Ann-Renée Desbiens	W 4–0	8–0–0 (6–0–0)
October 30	at Minnesota State	#3	Verizon Wireless Center • Mankato, MN	Ann-Renée Desbiens	W 6–0	9–0–0 (7–0–0)
October 31	at Minnesota State	#3	Verizon Wireless Center • Mankato, MN	Ann-Renée Desbiens	W 7–0	10–0–0 (8–0–0)
November 13	at Minnesota-Duluth	#1	Amsoil Arena • Duluth, MN	Ann-Renée Desbiens	W 3–0	11–0–0 (9–0–0)
November 14	at Minnesota-Duluth	#1	Amsoil Arena • Duluth, MN	Ann-Renée Desbiens	W 4–2	12–0–0 (10–0–0)
November 20	Lindenwood*	#1	LaBahn Arena • Madison, WI	Ann-Renée Desbiens	W 5–1	13–0–0
November 22	Lindenwood*	#1	LaBahn Arena • Madison, WI	Megan Miller	W 4–0	14–0–0
November 27	Dartmouth*	#1	LaBahn Arena • Madison, WI	Ann-Renée Desbiens	W 4–1	15–0–0
November 28	Dartmouth*	#1	LaBahn Arena • Madison, WI	Ann-Renée Desbiens	W 4–0	16–0–0
December 4	#3 Minnesota	#1	LaBahn Arena • Madison, WI	Ann-Renée Desbiens	W 3–2	17–0–0 (11–0–0)
December 5	#3 Minnesota	#1	LaBahn Arena • Madison, WI	Ann-Renée Desbiens	W 3–1	18–0–0 (12–0–0)
December 11	at #8 North Dakota	#1	Ralph Engelstad Arena • Grand Forks, ND	Ann-Renée Desbiens	L 0–3	18–1–0 (12–1–0)
December 12	at #8 North Dakota	#1	Ralph Engelstad Arena • Grand Forks, ND	Ann-Renée Desbiens	T 0–0 ^{OT}	18–1–1 (12–1–1)
January 8, 2016	Minnesota-Duluth	#2	LaBahn Arena • Madison, WI	Ann-Renée Desbiens	W 5–1	19–1–1 (13–1–1)
January 10	Minnesota-Duluth	#2	LaBahn Arena • Madison, WI	none	W 3–1	20–1–1 (14–1–1)
January 15	at Bemidji State	#2	Sanford Center • Bemidji, MN	Ann-Renée Desbiens	W 1–0	21–1–1 (15–1–1)
January 16	at Bemidji State	#2	Sanford Center • Bemidji, MN	Ann-Renée Desbiens	W 7–1	22–1–1 (16–1–1)
January 23	#8 North Dakota	#2	LaBahn Arena • Madison, WI	Ann-Renée Desbiens	W 1–0	23–1–1 (17–1–1)
January 24	#8 North Dakota	#2	LaBahn Arena • Madison, WI	Ann-Renée Desbiens	W 3–1	24–1–1 (18–1–1)
January 30	St. Cloud State	#2	LaBahn Arena • Madison, WI	Ann-Renée Desbiens	W 3–0	25–1–1 (19–1–1)
January 31	St. Cloud State	#2	LaBahn Arena • Madison, WI	Ann-Renée Desbiens	W 3–0	26–1–1 (20–1–1)
February 5	at Ohio State	#2	OSU Ice Rink • Columbus, OH	Ann-Renée Desbiens	W 2–1	27–1–1 (21–1–1)
February 6	at Ohio State	#2	OSU Ice Rink • Columbus, OH	Ann-Renée Desbiens	W 2–0	28–1–1 (22–1–1)
February 13	Minnesota State	#2	LaBahn Arena • Madison, WI	Ann-Renée Desbiens	W 4–0	29–1–1 (23–1–1)
February 14	Minnesota State	#2	LaBahn Arena • Madison, WI	Ann-Renée Desbiens	W 8–1	30–1–1 (24–1–1)
February 19	at #3 Minnesota	#2	Ridder Arena • Minneapolis, MN	Ann-Renée Desbiens	L 0–4	30–2–1 (24–2–1)
February 20	at #3 Minnesota	#2	Ridder Arena • Minneapolis, MN	Ann-Renée Desbiens	L 3–4 ^{OT}	30–3–1 (24–3–1)
WCHA Tournament
February 26	Minnesota State*	#3	LaBahn Arena • Madison, WI (Quarterfinals, Game 1)	Ann-Renée Desbiens	W 4–0	31–3–1
February 27	Minnesota State*	#3	LaBahn Arena • Madison, WI (Quarterfinals, Game 2)	Ann-Renée Desbiens	W 6–0	32–3–1
March 5	vs. Minnesota-Duluth*	#3	Ridder Arena • Minneapolis, MN (Final Face-Off WCHA Semifinal Game)	Ann-Renée Desbiens	W 5–0	33–3–1
March 6	at Minnesota*	#3	Ridder Arena • Minneapolis, MN (Final Face-Off WCHA Championship Game)	Ann-Renée Desbiens	W 1–0	34–3–1
NCAA Tournament
March 12	Mercyhurst*	#2	LaBahn Arena • Madison, WI (Quarterfinal Game)	Ann-Renée Desbiens	W 6–0	35–3–1
March 18	vs. #3 Minnesota*	#2	Whittemore Center • Durham, NH (Frozen Four Semifinal Game)	Ann-Renée Desbiens	L 2–3 ^{OT}	35–4–1
*Non-conference game. ^{#}Rankings from USCHO.com Poll.

== Awards and honors ==
- Samantha Cogan, forward, 2015-16 WHCA All-Rookie Team, WHCA Rookie of the Month twice in 2015-16, and WHCA Rookie of the Week on three occasions in 2015-16.
- Ann-Renee Desbiens, WCHA Player of the Week (Recognized for games of November 4–6, 2016)
- Ann-Renee Desbiens, 2016 WCHA Player of the Year
- Ann-Renée Desbiens, Goaltender, Patty Kazmaier Top Three Finalist
- Annie Pankowski, Forward, Patty Kazmaier Top Ten Finalist
- Mark Johnson, WCHA Coach of the Year
- Courtney Burke, Defense, WCHA 1st Team All-Star
- Ann-Renée Desbiens, Goaltender, WCHA 1st Team All-Star
- Annie Pankowski, Forward, WCHA 1st Team All-Star
- Emily Clark, Forward, WCHA 2nd Team All-Star
- Jenny Ryan, Defense, WCHA 2nd Team All-Star
- Sarah Nurse, Forward, WCHA 3rd Team All-Star
