= 2019–20 Lindenwood Lady Lions ice hockey season =

2019–20 Lindenwood Lady Lions women's ice hockey season
- Conference: 6th College Hockey America
- Home ice: Centene Community Ice Center

Record
- Overall: 5–24–5
- Conference: 3–15–2
- Home: 4–9–3
- Road: 1–14–2
- Neutral: 0–1–0

Coaches and captains
- Head coach: Shelley Looney(1st season)
- Assistant coaches: Kriste Kehoe; Greg Haney; Nicole Hensley
- Captain: Courtney Ganske
- Alternate captain(s): Lillian Marchant; Kirsten Martin; Erin Near

The Lindenwood Lady Lions women represented Lindenwood University in CHA women's ice hockey during the 2019-20 NCAA Division I women's ice hockey season. The Lady Lions welcomed a new head coach, Shelley Looney, and new members of the coaching staff, notably alumnus goaltender Nicole Hensley. Both Looney and Hensley are Olympic gold medalists. The team also moved to a new facility, the Centene Community Ice Center, in St. Louis suburb Maryland Heights. Inexperience and injuries led to a disappointing start to Looney's tenure.

== Offseason ==
Former star Kendra Broad signed a contract to play with the Connecticut Whale of the NWHL.

=== Recruiting ===
Player	Position	Nationality	Notes
Casey Adimey	Defense	United States	Transfer from UMass-Boston
Lokelani Antonio	Forward	United States	Played for AAA Anaheim Lady Ducks
Lauren Dabrowski	Defense	Canada	Former Blueliner for Aurora Panthers
Madilynn Hickey	Forward	United States	Culver Academy grad
Julia Maguire	Goaltender	United States	Transfer from Mercyhurst
Meara Ryan	Forward	Canada	Played for Ottawa Lady Senators
Meara Ryan	Forward	Canada	Teammate of Gigi Pora on Ottawa team
Sena Takenaka	Defense	Japan	Graduate of Ontario Hockey Academy

== Standings ==
2019–20 College Hockey America standings
	Conference							Overall					
	GP	W	L	T	PTS	GF	GA	GP	W	L	T	GF	GA
#10 Mercyhurst†*	20	13	4	3	29	68	40	34	19	10	5	107	73
Robert Morris	20	13	5	2	28	67	40	34	19	11	4	111	82
Syracuse	20	11	7	2	24	69	40	34	13	19	2	99	89
Penn State	20	7	8	5	19	38	42	36	13	15	8	70	80
RIT	20	5	13	2	12	39	72	34	12	18	4	76	103
Lindenwood	20	3	15	2	8	26	73	33	5	23	5	42	117
Championship: March 7, 2020 † indicates conference regular season champion; * indicates conference tournament champion Rankings: USCHO.com

== Roster ==
=== 2019–20 Lady Lions ===
No.	Nat.	Player	Class	Pos	Height	DoB	Hometown	Previous team
1		Annika Asplundh	Sophomore	G	5' 7" (1.7 m)		New Hope, Pennsylvania	New Jersey Colonials
2		Kirsten Martin (A)	Senior	F	5' 8" (1.73 m)		Rosedale, British Columbia	Pacific Steelers
4		Casey Adimey	Sophomore	D	5' 8" (1.73 m)		Amherst, New York	Buffalo Bison
7		Sierra Burt	Junior	F	5' 6" (1.68 m)		Bayside, Ontario	Team Ontario Blue
8		Maddison Stitt	Sophomore	D	5' 10" (1.78 m)		Ottawa, Ontario	Ottawa Lady Senators
9		Meara Ryan	Freshman	F	5' 7" (1.7 m)		Pembroke, Ontario	Ottawa Lady Senators
11		Erin Near (A)	Senior	F	5' 6" (1.68 m)		New Hamburg, Ontario	Toronto Jr. Aeros
12		Sena Takenaka	Freshman	F	5' 3" (1.6 m)		Osaka, Japan	Ontario Hockey Academy
13		Megan Wagner	Junior	F	5' 1" (1.55 m)		Niles, Illinois	Chicago Mission
14		Jane Jacobs	Sophomore	D	5' 6" (1.68 m)		Carseland, Alberta	Edge School
15		Lauren Dabrowski	Freshman	D	5' 8" (1.73 m)		Tiny, Ontario	Aurora Panthers
16		Cierra Paisley	Senior	F	5' 6" (1.68 m)		Shawnigan Lake, British Columbia	Vancouver Comets
17		Gigi Pora	Freshman	F	5' 8" (1.73 m)		Greely, Ontario	Ottawa Lady Senators
18		Lillian Marchant (A)	Senior	F	5' 6" (1.68 m)		Tustin, California	Anaheim Lady Ducks
19		Hannah Alt	Junior	F	5' 3" (1.6 m)		Belvidere, Illinois	Chicago Mission
20		Madilynn Hickey	Freshman	F	5' 6" (1.68 m)		Lowell, Indiana	Culver Academy
21		Lokelani Antonio	Freshman	F	5' 6" (1.68 m)		Black Diamond, Washington	Anaheim Lady Ducks
22		Courtney Ganske (C)	Senior	F	5' 6" (1.68 m)		Killarney, Manitoba	Westman Wildcats
24		Jada Burke	Sophomore	F	6' 0" (1.83 m)		Nepean, Ontario	Nepean Wildcats
26		Kayla Martinez	Sophomore	D	5' 7" (1.7 m)		Livonia, Michigan	Detroit Honeybaked
27		Bailey Coyne	Junior	F	5' 3" (1.6 m)		Palos Heights, Illinois	Mid Fairfield CT Stars
30		Julia Maguire	Freshman	G	5' 7" (1.7 m)		Muskegon, Michigan	North Mukegon HS
31		Sophie Wolf	Sophomore	G	5' 8" (1.73 m)		Nepean, Ontario	Nepean Wildcats
39		Lauren Hennessey	Junior	G	5' 8" (1.73 m)		Lynnfield, Massachusetts	Boston Jr. Shamrocks

== Schedule ==
Date	Opponent^{#}	Rank^{#}	Site	Decision	Result	Record
Regular Season
September 27	#1 Wisconsin*		Centene Community Ice Center • Maryland Heights, MO	Sophie Wolf	L 0–4	0–1–0
September 28	#1 Wisconsin*		Centene Community Ice Center • Maryland Heights, MO	Sophie Wolf	L 2–6	0–2–0
October 4	at Bemidji State*		Sanford Center • Bemidji, MN	Sophie Wolf	W 3–2	1–2–0
October 5	at Bemidji State*		Sanford Center • Bemidji, MN	Annika Asplundh	L 0–1	1–3–0
October 18	Union*		Centene Community Ice Center • Maryland Heights, MO	Annika Asplundh	W 3–1	2–3–0
October 19	Union*		Centene Community Ice Center • Maryland Heights, MO	Sophie Wolf	T 2–2 ^{OT}	2–3–1
October 25	at #4 Clarkson*		Cheel Arena • Potsdam, NY	Annika Asplundh	T 1–1 ^{OT}	2–3–2
October 26	at #4 Clarkson*		Cheel Arena • Potsdam, NY	Annika Asplundh	L 0–7	2–4–2
November 1	at Mercyhurst		Mercyhurst Ice Center • Erie, PA	Annika Asplundh	L 0–3	2–5–2 (0–1–0)
November 2	at Mercyhurst		Mercyhurst Ice Center • Erie, PA	Annika Asplundh	L 2–7	2–6–2 (0–2–0)
November 8	Robert Morris		Centene Community Ice Center • Maryland Heights, MO	Annika Asplundh	L 0–2	2–7–2 (0–3–0)
November 9	Robert Morris		Centene Community Ice Center • Maryland Heights, MO	Annika Asplundh	L 3–4 ^{OT}	2–8–2 (0–4–0)
November 15	St. Cloud State*		Centene Community Ice Center • Maryland Heights, MO	Annika Asplundh	T 2–2 ^{OT}	2–8–3
November 16	St. Cloud State*		Centene Community Ice Center • Maryland Heights, MO	Annika Asplundh	L 1–5	2–9–3
November 29	at St. Cloud State*		Herb Brooks National Hockey Center • St. Cloud, MN	Lauren Hennessey	L 0–6	2–10–3
December 6	Syracuse		Centene Community Ice Center • Maryland Heights, MO	Cierra Paisley	L 0–7	2–11–3 (0–5–0)
December 7	Syracuse		Centene Community Ice Center • Maryland Heights, MO	Madilynn Hickey	L 1–13	2–12–3 (0–6–0)
January 10, 2020	at Penn State		Pegula Ice Arena • University Park, PA	Annika Asplundh	L 1–2	2–13–3 (0–7–0)
January 11	at Penn State		Pegula Ice Arena • University Park, PA	Annika Asplundh	L 2–3	2–14–3 (0–8–0)
January 17	RIT		Centene Community Ice Center • Maryland Heights, MO	Annika Asplundh	W 3–0	3–14–3 (1–8–0)
January 18	RIT		Centene Community Ice Center • Maryland Heights, MO	Annika Asplundh	W 2–0	4–14–3 (2–8–0)
January 24	at Robert Morris		Colonials Arena • Neville Township, PA	Annika Asplundh	L 0–3	4–15–3 (2–9–0)
January 25	at Robert Morris		Colonials Arena • Neville Township, PA	Annika Asplundh	L 1–4	4–16–3 (2–10–0)
January 31	at Minnesota State*		Verizon Center • Mankato, MN	Annika Asplundh	L 0–3	4–17–3
February 1	at Minnesota State*		Verizon Center • Mankato, MN	Julia Maguire	L 2–4	4–18–3
February 7	Mercyhurst		Centene Community Ice Center • Maryland Heights, MO	Annika Asplundh	W 3–2	5–18–3 (3–10–0)
February 8	Mercyhurst		Centene Community Ice Center • Maryland Heights, MO	Annika Asplundh	L 0–1	5–19–3 (3–11–0)
February 14	at Syracuse		Tennity Ice Skating Pavilion • Syracuse, NY	Annika Asplundh	L 2–3	5–20–3 (3–12–0)
February 15	at Syracuse		Tennity Ice Skating Pavilion • Syracuse, NY	Annika Asplundh	L 0–8	5–21–3 (3–13–0)
February 21	Penn State		Centene Community Ice Center • Maryland Heights, MO	Annika Asplundh	T 1–1 ^{OT}	5–21–4 (3–13–1)
February 22	Penn State		Centene Community Ice Center • Maryland Heights, MO	Annika Asplundh	L 1–5	5–22–4 (3–14–1)
February 28	at RIT		Gene Polisseni Center • Rochester, NY	Julia Maguire	L 3–4	5–23–4 (3–15–1)
February 29	at RIT		Gene Polisseni Center • Rochester, NY	Annika Asplundh	T 1–1 ^{OT}	5–23–5 (3–15–2)
CHA Tournament
March 5	vs. Syracuse*		LECOM Harborcenter • Buffalo, NY (Quarterfinal Game)	Sophie Wolf	L 0–4	5–24–5
*Non-conference game. ^{#}Rankings from USCHO.com Poll.
