= 2019–20 Minnesota Golden Gophers women's ice hockey season =

College ice hockey team season

2020 NCAA tournament, Tournament cancelled due to COVID-19 pandemic
- Conference: WCHA
- Home ice: Ridder Arena

Record
- Overall: 27–6–3
- Home: 15–3–1
- Road: 10–3–1
- Neutral: 2–0–1

Coaches and captains
- Head coach: Brad Frost
- Assistant coaches: Joel Johnson; Bethany Brausen
- Captain: Patti Marshall

The 2019–20 Minnesota Golden Gophers women's ice hockey season represented the University of Minnesota during the 2019–20 NCAA Division I women's ice hockey season. They were coached by Brad Frost in his 13th season. The Golden Gophers advanced to the 2020 NCAA tournament, however, the tournament was cancelled due to the COVID-19 pandemic.

== Recruiting ==
Player	Position	Nationality	Notes
Olivia King	Goaltender	United States	Played for Brainerd High School
Makayla Pahl	Goaltender	United States	Played for Mayo High School
Sydney Shearen	Forward	United States	Played for White Bear Lake Area High School
Madeline Wethington	Defense	United States	Played for The Blake School

== Regular season ==
=== Standings ===
2019–20 Western Collegiate Hockey Association standings
	Conference								Overall					
	GP	W	L	T	SW	PTS	GF	GA	GP	W	L	T	GF	GA
#2 Wisconsin	26	17	4	3	2	56	97	48	34	27	4	3	156	60
#3 Minnesota	24	17	5	2	0	53	86	40	35	27	5	3	137	57
#5 Ohio State	26	13	6	5	2	46	81	56	36	22	8	6	116	79
#9 Minnesota Duluth	27	11	8	5	3	41	69	60	35	18	11	6	98	77
Bemidji State	24	9	13	2	0	29	46	68	37	16	18	3	71	91
Minnesota State	27	4	16	4	3	19	40	83	37	11	20	6	71	108
St. Cloud State	24	2	21	1	0	7	32	98	35	6	25	4	62	122
Championship: March 8, 2020 † indicates conference regular season champion; * indicates conference tournament champion Rankings: USCHO.com

=== Schedule ===
Date	Time	Opponent^{#}	Rank^{#}	Site	Decision	Result	Attendance	Record
Regular Season
September 27	7:07	Colgate*	#2	Ridder Arena • Minneapolis, MN	Scobee	W 2–0	1,238	1–0–0
September 28	4:07	Colgate*	#2	Ridder Arena • Minneapolis, MN	Scobee	W 8–1	1,190	2–0–0
October 4	7:07	at Minnesota State	#2	Mankato Civic Center • Mankato, MN	Scobee	W 6–0	305	3–0–0 (1–0–0)
October 5	2:07	at Minnesota State	#2	Mankato Civic Center • Minneapolis, MN	Scobee	W 7–1	297	4–0–0 (2–0–0)
October 11	2:00	at Robert Morris*	#2	Colonials Arena • Pittsburgh, PA	Scobee	W 4–3 ^{OT}	493	5–0–0 (2–0–0)
October 12	12:00	at Robert Morris*	#2	Colonials Arena • Pittsburgh, PA	Scobee	W 6–2	237	6–0–0 (2–0–0)
October 19	4:07	St. Cloud State	#2	Ridder Arena • Minneapolis, MN	Scobee	W 8–1	1,856	7–0–0 (3–0–0)
October 20	2:07	St. Cloud State	#2	Ridder Arena • Minneapolis, MN	Scobee	W 8–1	1,448	8–0–0 (4–0–0)
October 25	5:07	at #9 Ohio State	#2	The Ohio State University Ice Rink • Columbus, OH	Scobee	L 3–4	548	8–1–0 (4–1–0)
October 26	2:07	at #9 Ohio State	#2	The Ohio State University Ice Rink • Columbus, OH	Scobee	W 8–1	393	9–1–0 (5–1–0)
November 2	2:07	#1 Wisconsin	#2	Ridder Arena • Minneapolis, MN	Scobee	W 8–1	3,283	10–1–0 (6–1–0)
November 3	2:07	#1 Wisconsin	#2	Ridder Arena • Minneapolis, MN	Scobee	T 2–2	2,645	10–1–1 (6–1–1–1)
November 15	6:07	Bemidji State	#1	Ridder Arena • Minneapolis, MN	Scobee	W 7–1	1,935	11–1–1 (7–1–1–1)
November 16	4:07	Bemidji State	#1	Ridder Arena • Minneapolis, MN	Scobee	W 3–0	1,919	12–1–1 (8–1–1–1)
November 22	3:07	at #10 Minnesota Duluth	#1	AMSOIL Arena • Duluth, MN	Scobee	T 2–2	877	12–1–2 (8–1–2–1)
November 15	6:07	at Minnesota Duluth	#1	AMSOIL Arena • Duluth, MN	Scobee	W 4–3	2,018	13–1–2 (9–1–2–1)
November 29	1:00	vs. #8 Boston College*	#1	Ford Ice Center Bellevue • Nashville, TN (Country Classic)	Scobee	T 2–2	1,250	13–1–3 (9–1–2–1)
November 30	4:30	vs. Harvard*	#1	Ford Ice Center Bellevue • Nashville, TN (Country Classic)	Scobee	W 4–0	1,250	14–1–3 (9–1–2–1)
December 7	3:30	vs. Minnesota State*	#2	Dakotah Ice Center • Prior Lake, MN (U.S. Hockey Hall of Fame Museum Game)	Scobee	W 4–0	1,410	15–1–3 (9–1–2–1)
January 4	4:07	Yale*	#2	Ridder Arena • Minneapolis, MN	Scobee	W 6–3	2,507	16–1–3 (9–1–2–1)
January 5	2:07	Yale*	#2	Ridder Arena • Minneapolis, MN	Scobee	W 4–1	2,102	17–1–3 (9–1–2–1)
January 10	6:07	at St. Cloud State	#2	Herb Brooks National Hockey Center • St. Cloud, MN	Scobee	W 4–1	362	18–1–3 (10–1–2–1)
January 4	4:07	at St. Cloud State	#2	Herb Brooks National Hockey Center • St. Cloud, MN	Scobee	W 3–0	416	19–1–3 (11–1–2–1)
January 17	6:07	#5 Ohio State	#1	Ridder Arena • Minneapolis, MN	Scobee	L 1–4	1,553	19–2–3 (11–2–2–1)
January 4	4:07	vs. #5 Ohio State	#1	Parade Stadium • Minneapolis, MN	Scobee	W 2–1	2,100	20–2–3 (12–2–2–1)
January 24	7:07	at #1 Wisconsin	#2	LaBahn Arena • Madison, WI	Scobee	L 4–5 ^{OT}	2,273	20–3–3 (12–3–2–1)
January 25	3:07	at #1 Wisconsin	#2	LaBahn Arena • Madison, WI	Scobee	L 0–3	2,273	20–4–3 (12–4–2–1)
January 31	7:07	#9 Minnesota Duluth	#2	Ridder Arena • Minneapolis, MN	Scobee	W 5–0	2,627	21–4–3 (13–4–2–1)
February 1	4:07	#9 Minnesota Duluth	#2	Ridder Arena • Minneapolis, MN	Scobee	L 0–2	2,967	21–5–3 (13–5–2–1)
February 7	6:07	at Bemidji State	#4	Sanford Center • Bemidji, MN	Scobee	W 4–1	549	22–5–3 (14–5–2–1)
February 8	3:07	at Bemidji State	#4	Sanford Center • Bemidji, MN	Scobee	W 6–3	429	23–5–3 (15–5–2–1)
February 21	7:07	Minnesota State	#3	Ridder Arena • Minneapolis, MN	Scobee	W 5–1	2,018	24–5–3 (16–5–2–1)
February 22	4:07	Minnesota State	#3	Ridder Arena • Minneapolis, MN	Scobee	W 3–0	2,195	25–5–3 (17–5–2–1)
WCHA Tournament
February 28	6:37	St. Cloud State*	#3	Ridder Arena • Minneapolis, MN	Scobee	W 4–2	1,226	26–5–3 (17–5–2–1)
February 29	2:07	St. Cloud State*	#3	Ridder Arena • Minneapolis, MN	Scobee	W 7–3	1,362	27–5–3 (17–5–2–1)
March 7	5:00	#3 Ohio State*	#2	Ridder Arena • Minneapolis, MN (WCHA Final Faceoff)	Scobee	L 3–4 ^{OT}	2,693	27–6–3 (17–5–2–1)
NCAA Tournament
March 14	Cancelled	Ohio State*	#4	Ridder Arena • Minneapolis, MN	–	–	–	27–6–3 (17–5–2–1)
*Non-conference game. ^{#}Rankings from USCHO.com Poll.

=== Roster ===
No.	Nat.	Player	Class	Pos	Height	DoB	Hometown	Previous team
1		Olivia King	Freshman	G	5' 6" (1.68 m)	2001-01-05	Garrison, Minnesota	Brainerd High School
2		Emily Brown	Junior	D	5' 7" (1.7 m)	1998-12-30	Blaine, Minnesota	Blaine High School
3		Catie Skaja	Sophomore	F	5' 7" (1.7 m)	1999-07-28	New Prague, Minnesota	New Prague High School
5		Madeline Wethington	Freshman	D	5' 10" (1.78 m)	2000-07-14	Edina, Minnesota	Blake School
6		Gracie Ostertag	Sophomore	D	5' 7" (1.7 m)	2000-02-14	Shakopee, Minnesota	Shattuck-Saint Mary's
7		Sydney Shearen	Freshman	F	5' 4" (1.63 m)	2001-08-02	Hugo, Minnesota	White Bear Lake Area High School
8		Kippin Keller	Senior	F	5' 4" (1.63 m)	1997-12-16	Minnetonka, Minnesota	Minnetonka High School
9		Taylor Heise	Sophomore	F	5' 10" (1.78 m)	2000-03-17	Lake City, Minnesota	Red Wing High School
12		Grace Zumwinkle	Junior	F	5' 8" (1.73 m)	1999-04-23	Excelsior, Minnesota	Breck School
13		Crystalyn Hengler	Sophomore	D	5' 8" (1.73 m)	1999-09-11	Eden Prairie, Minnesota	Eden Prairie High School
16		Amy Potomak	Sophomore (RS)	F	5' 9" (1.75 m)	1999-01-25	Aldergrove, British Columbia	George Eliot Secondary
18		Katie Robinson	Senior	D	5' 10" (1.78 m)	1997-10-08	Kasson, Minnesota	Kasson-Mantorville High School
20		Alex Woken (A)	Senior	F	5' 8" (1.73 m)	1998-02-25	Fargo, North Dakota	Shattuck-Saint Mary's
21		Emily Oden	Sophomore	F	5' 8" (1.73 m)	1999-11-14	Edina, Minnesota	Edina High School
22		Abigail Boreen	Sophomore	F	5' 8" (1.73 m)	2000-04-03	Somerset, Wisconsin	Hill-Murray School
24		Olivia Knowles	Junior	D	5' 9" (1.75 m)	1999-01-24	Campbell River, British Columbia	Penticton Secondary School
26		Sarah Potomak	Senior (RS)	F	5' 5" (1.65 m)	1996-04-08	Aldergrove, British Columbia	George Eliot Secondary
27		Patti Marshall	Senior	D	5' 7" (1.7 m)	1998-05-11	Thief River Falls, MN	Shattuck-Saint Mary's
28		Taylor Wente	Junior	F	5' 8" (1.73 m)	1999-04-01	Plymouth, Minnesota	Maple Grove High School
33		Makayla Pahl	Freshman	G	5' 11" (1.8 m)	2001-07-28	Rochester, Minnesota	Mayo High School
37		Sydney Scobee	Senior	G	6' 0" (1.83 m)	1995-02-26	Minnetrista, Minnesota	Vermont (Hockey East)
