= 2019–20 Union Dutchwomen ice hockey season =

2019–20 Union Dutchwomen women's ice hockey season
- Conference: 9 ECAC Hockey
- Home ice: Achilles Center

Record
- Overall: 5-24-5

Coaches and captains
- Head coach: Josh Sciba

The Union Dutchwomen represented Union College in ECAC women's ice hockey during the 2019–20 NCAA Division I women's ice hockey season.

== Regular season ==
=== Standings ===
- 2019–20 ECAC Hockey standings
  	Conference							Overall					
  	GP	W	L	T	PTS	GF	GA	GP	W	L	T	GF	GA
  #1 Cornell	22	19	0	3	41	84	16	31	27	1	3	121	28
  #6 Princeton	22	17	4	1	35	77	40	31	24	6	1	114	54
  #7 Clarkson	22	14	4	4	32	63	29	36	25	5	6	110	50
  Harvard	22	15	6	1	31	69	53	32	18	13	1	93	85
  Yale	22	13	9	0	26	53	49	32	17	15	0	86	81
  Colgate	22	11	8	3	25	71	43	38	17	15	6	110	84
  #10 Quinnipiac	22	11	9	2	24	63	43	37	20	14	3	104	70
  St. Lawrence	22	8	10	4	20	34	43	36	13	16	7	73	83
  Union	22	5	14	3	13	39	74	34	5	24	5	52	115
  Dartmouth	22	4	15	3	11	36	70	29	7	19	3	52	91
  Brown	22	2	18	2	6	24	85	29	3	23	3	33	119
  RPI	22	0	22	0	0	14	82	34	0	33	1	21	122
  Championship: March 10, 2020 † indicates conference regular season champion; * indicates conference tournament champion Rankings: USCHO.com

=== Schedule ===
Date	Opponent^{#}	Rank^{#}	Site	Decision	Result	Record
Regular Season
September 27	at Robert Morris Colonials		Pittsburgh, Pennsylvania	Amelia Murray (L, 1)	L 1-6	0-1-0 (0-0-0)
September 28	at Robert Morris Colonials		Pittsburgh, Pennsylvania	Bella McKee (L, 1)	L 0-5	0-2-0 (0-0-0)
October 4	#4 Northeastern Huskies			Amelia Murray (L, 2)	L 0-5	0-3-0 (0-0-0)
*Non-conference game. ^{#}Rankings from USCHO.com Poll.

== Roster ==
=== 2019-20 Dutchwomen ===
No.	Nat.	Player	Class	Pos	Height	DoB	Hometown	Previous team
2		Megan Ryan	Junior	D	5' 3" (1.6 m)		Faribault, Minnesota	Shattuck St. Mary’s
3		Olivia Groulx	Freshman	D	5' 6" (1.68 m)		Curran, Ontario	Ottawa Lady Senators (PWHL)
4		Grace Heiting	Sophomore	F	5' 3" (1.6 m)		Woodbury, Minnesota	Gentry Academy
5		Ava Reynolds	Senior	D	5' 6" (1.68 m)		Aurora, Colorado	Northern Cyclones
6		Megan Ryan	Freshman	F	5' 3" (1.6 m)		St. Louis, Missouri	Shattuck St. Mary’s
9		Angelica Melone	Junior	D	5' 8" (1.73 m)		Riverside, Illinois	Chicago Mission
11		Cheyenne Harris	Senior	D	5' 7" (1.7 m)		Minneapolis, Minnesota	Minnesota Jr. Whitecaps
26		Jordi Naidrich	Senior	F	5' 5" (1.65 m)		Newtown, Pennsylvania	New Jersey Rockets
27		Maia Martinez	Sophomore	F	5' 7" (1.7 m)		Maple Grove, Minnesota	Maple Grove HS
29		Kate Spooner	Senior	G	5' 7" (1.7 m)		Grand Pre, Nova Scotia	Pro-Cresting Penguins (NSFMHL)
31		Coco Francis	Junior	G	5' 9" (1.75 m)		Maple Grove, Minnesota	Minnesota Jr. Whitecaps
33		Amelia Murray	Senior	G	5' 8" (1.73 m)		McHenry, Illinois	Chicago Young Americans
34		Bella McKee	Freshman	G	5' 6" (1.68 m)		Irma, Alberta	Lloydminster Steelers (AFHL)

== Awards and honors ==
Bella McKee, ECAC Hockey Goaltender of the Week (Union) (awarded October 21, 2019)
