= 2019–20 Syracuse Orange women's ice hockey season =

- Conference: 3rd College Hockey America
- Home ice: Tennity Ice Skating Pavilion

Record
- Overall: 14-20-2
- Conference: 11–7–2
- Home: 7-12-0
- Road: 6-7-2
- Neutral: 1-1-0

Coaches and captains
- Head coach: Paul Flanagan 12th season
- Assistant coaches: Julie Knerr; Brendon Knight
- Captain: Lindsay Eastwood
- Alternate captain(s): Logan Hicks; Kristen Siermachesky

The Syracuse Orange women represented Syracuse University in CHA women's ice hockey during the 2019-20 NCAA Division I women's ice hockey season. After a disappointing start of the season against nationally ranked teams, Syracuse had a very successful second half, finishing a competitive third place in the conference, five points from first place Mercyhurst University.

== Offseason ==
Junior Jessica DiGirolamo was named to Hockey Canada's National Women's Development Team for the August, 2019 series against the United States at Lake Placid, New York.

=== Recruiting ===
Player	Position	Nationality	Notes
Brynn Koocher	Forward	Canada	Played for the Kitchener-Waterloo Rangers
Madison Beishuizen	Forward	Canada	Teammate of Koocher on K-W Rangers
Anna Leschyshyn	Forward	Canada	National Champion with Saskatchewan U18 Team
Mae Batherson	Defense	Canada	Played for Kingston Jr. Ice Wolves

== Standings ==
2019–20 College Hockey America standings
	Conference							Overall					
	GP	W	L	T	PTS	GF	GA	GP	W	L	T	GF	GA
#10 Mercyhurst†*	20	13	4	3	29	68	40	34	19	10	5	107	73
Robert Morris	20	13	5	2	28	67	40	34	19	11	4	111	82
Syracuse	20	11	7	2	24	69	40	34	13	19	2	99	89
Penn State	20	7	8	5	19	38	42	36	13	15	8	70	80
RIT	20	5	13	2	12	39	72	34	12	18	4	76	103
Lindenwood	20	3	15	2	8	26	73	33	5	23	5	42	117
Championship: March 7, 2020 † indicates conference regular season champion; * indicates conference tournament champion Rankings: USCHO.com

== Roster ==
=== 2019–20 Orange ===
No.	Nat.	Player	Class	Pos	Height	DoB	Hometown	Previous team
2		Logan Hicks (A)	Senior	D	5' 9" (1.75 m)		Scottsdale, Arizona	St. Louis Lady Blues
3		Amanda Bäckebo	Senior	D	5' 3" (1.6 m)		Ganef, Sweden	Swedish National Team U18
4		Lindsay Eastwood (C)	Senior (RS)	D	6' 1" (1.85 m)		Kanata, Ontario	Team Canada U18
5		Brynn Koocher	Freshman	F	5' 5" (1.65 m)		Binbrook, Ontario	Kitchener-Waterloo Rangers
6		Shelby Calof	Sophomore	D	5' 8" (1.73 m)		Ottawa, Ontario	Nepean Jr. Wildcats
7		Emma Polaski	Junior	F	5' 7" (1.7 m)		Morristown, New Jersey	New Jersey Colonials
8		Lauren Bellefontaine	Sophomore	F	5' 6" (1.68 m)		Kemptville, Ontario	Nepean Jr. Wildcats
11		Kelli Rowswell	Senior	F	5' 9" (1.75 m)		Winnipeg, Manitoba	Team Manitoba U18
12		Kristen Siermachesky (A)	Junior	F	5' 11" (1.8 m)		New Liskeard, Ontario	Stoney Creek Jr. Sabres
13		Abby Moloughney	Sophomore	F	5' 6" (1.68 m)		Ottawa, Ontario	Team Canada U18
14		Savannah Rennie	Senior	F	5' 7" (1.7 m)		East St. Paul, Manitoba	Team Manitoba U18
17		Madison Beishuizen	Freshman	F	5' 5" (1.65 m)		Ripley, Ontario	Kitchener-Waterloo Rangers
18		Allie Olnowich	Senior	D	5' 7" (1.7 m)		Chatham, New Jersey	New Jersey Rockets
19		Anna Leschyshyn	Freshman	F	6' 0" (1.83 m)		Grasswood, Saskatchewan	Team Saskatchewan U18
20		Anonda Hoppner	Senior	F	5' 10" (1.78 m)		Carp, Ontario	Colgate
21		Mae Batherson	Freshman	D	5' 7" (1.7 m)		New Minas, Nova Scotia	Kingston Jr. Ice Wolves
22		Jessica DiGirolamo	Junior	D	5' 9" (1.75 m)		Mississauga, Ontario	Oakville Jr. Hornets
23		Marielle McHale	Sophomore	F	5' 10" (1.78 m)		Clifton Park, New York	Williston Northampton School
27		Victoria Klimek	Junior	F	5' 8" (1.73 m)		Orangeville, Ontario	Oakville Jr. Hornets
31		Allison Small	Junior	G	5' 9" (1.75 m)		Nestleton, Ontario	Quinnipiac
32		Ady Cohen	Senior	G	5' 6" (1.68 m)		Boynton Beach, Florida	Gilmour Academy

== 2019-20 Schedule ==
Date	Opponent^{#}	Rank^{#}	Site	Decision	Result	Record
Regular Season
September 27	#3 Clarkson*		Tennity Ice Skating Pavilion • Syracuse, NY	Ady Cohen	L 3-4	0–1–0
September 28	at #3 Clarkson*		Cheel Arena • Potsdam, NY	Allison Small	L 1-5	0–2–0
October 5	#7 Boston College*		Tennity Ice Skating Pavilion • Syracuse, NY	Ady Cohen	L 3-4	0–3–0
October 11	#3 Northeastern*		Tennity Ice Skating Pavilion • Syracuse, NY	Allison Small	L 1-2	0–4–0
October 12	#3 Northeastern*		Tennity Ice Skating Pavilion • Syracuse, NY	Allison Small	L 3-6	0–5–0
October 18	at Colgate*		Class of 1965 Arena • Hamilton, NY	Ady Cohen	L 2-5	0–6–0
October 19	Colgate*		Tennity Ice Skating Pavilion • Syracuse, NY	Allison Small	L 1-5	0–7–0
October 25	at #6 Princeton*		Hobey Baker Memorial Rink • Princeton, NJ	Allison Small	L 1-3	0–8–0
October 26	at #6 Princeton*		Hobey Baker Memorial Rink • Princeton, NJ	Allison Small	L 0-3	0–9–0
October 29	at Union*		Achilles Center • Schenectady, NY	Ady Cohen	W 5-0	1–9–0
November 1	RIT		Tennity Ice Skating Pavilion • Syracuse, NY	Allison Small	L 4-7	1–10–0 (0–1–0)
November 2	at RIT		Gene Polisseni Center • Rochester, NY	Ady Cohen	W 3-0	2–10–0 (1–1–0)
November 16	St. Lawrence*		War Memorial Arena • Syracuse, NY	Allison Small	L 3-4 ^{OT}	2–11–0
November 23	at Penn State		Pegula Ice Arena • University Park, PA	Allison Small	T 1-1 ^{OT}	2–11–1 (1–1–1)
November 24	at Penn State		Pegula Ice Arena • University Park, PA	Allison Small	W 3-1	3–11–1 (2–1–1)
November 26	#3 Cornell*		Tennity Ice Skating Pavilion • Syracuse, NY	Ady Cohen	L 1-4	3–12–1
December 6	at Lindenwood		Centene Community Ice Center • Maryland Heights, MO	Allison Small	W 7-0	4–12–1 (3–1–1)
December 7	at Lindenwood		Centene Community Ice Center • Maryland Heights, MO	Ady Cohen	W 13-1	5–12–1 (4–1–1)
January 7, 2020	St. Lawrence*		Tennity Ice Skating Pavilion • Syracuse, NY	Allison Small	L 1-3	5–13–1
January 10	Mercyhurst		Tennity Ice Skating Pavilion • Syracuse, NY	Ady Cohen	W 8-3	6–13–1 (5–1–1)
January 11	Mercyhurst		Tennity Ice Skating Pavilion • Syracuse, NY	Ady Cohen	L 3-4 ^{OT}	6–14–1 (5–2–1)
January 17	at Robert Morris		Colonials Arena • Neville Township, PA	Ady Cohen	L 1-5	6–15–1 (5–3–1)
January 18	at Robert Morris		Colonials Arena • Neville Township, PA	Allison Small	W 1-0	7–15–1 (6–3–1)
January 24	Penn State		Tennity Ice Skating Pavilion • Syracuse, NY	Allison Small	L 0-1	7–16–1 (6–4–1)
January 25	Penn State		Tennity Ice Skating Pavilion • Syracuse, NY	Allison Small	W 3-1	8–16–1 (7–4–1)
February 1	Rensselaer*		Tennity Ice Skating Pavilion • Syracuse, NY	Ady Cohen	W 5-1	9–16–1
February 7	RIT		Tennity Ice Skating Pavilion • Syracuse, NY	Ady Cohen	W 3-1	10–16–1 (8–4–1)
February 8	at RIT		Gene Polisseni Center • Rochester, NY	Allison Small	T 2-2 ^{OT}	10–16–2 (8–4–2)
February 14	Lindenwood		Tennity Ice Skating Pavilion • Syracuse, NY	Ady Cohen	W 3-2	11–16–2 (9–4–2)
February 15	Lindenwood		Tennity Ice Skating Pavilion • Syracuse, NY	Allison Small	W 8-0	12–16–2 (10–4–2)
February 21	at Mercyhurst		Mercyhurst Ice Center • Erie, PA	Ady Cohen	L 2-6	12–17–2 (10–5–2)
February 22	at Mercyhurst		Mercyhurst Ice Center • Erie, PA	Allison Small	L 0-1	12–18–2 (10–6–2)
February 28	Robert Morris		Tennity Ice Skating Pavilion • Syracuse, NY	Allison Small	L 0-2	12–19–2 (10–7–2)
February 29	Robert Morris		Tennity Ice Skating Pavilion • Syracuse, NY	Allison Small	W 4-2	13–19–2 (11–7–2)
CHA Tournament
March 5	vs. Lindenwood*		HarborCenter • Buffalo, NY (Quarterfinal Game)	Allison Small	W 4–0	14–19–2
March 6	vs. Robert Morris*		HarborCenter • Buffalo, NY (Semifinal Game)	Allison Small	L 2–5	14–20–2
*Non-conference game. ^{#}Rankings from USCHO.com Poll.

== Awards and honors ==
Sophomore Forward Abby Moloughney was named the Individual Sportsman of the year in the CHA Conference, with no penalties in conference play. She was also named to the CHA All-Conference First Team Senior Defender and Captain Lindsay Eastwood was also named to the first team, as well as the CHA Best Defenseman. Senior Savannah Rennie was named to the CHA All-Conference Second team on the strength of six multi-point games.

Defender Mae Batherson was named the CHA Rookie of the year. She joined Forward Madison Beishuizen on the Conference All-Rookie Team.

Following the CHA Tournament, Junior Forward Victoria Klimek was named to the All-Tournament team. Klimek had a hat trick in the 4–0 victory against Lindenwood, and had an assist in the season ending loss to Robert Morris.
