= 2019–20 Mercyhurst Lakers women's ice hockey season =

CHA Regular Season Champions, CHA Tournament Champions
- Conference: 1st College Hockey America
- Home ice: Mercyhurst Ice Center

Record
- Overall: 21–10–5
- Conference: 13–4–3
- Home: 12–0–4
- Road: 6–9–1
- Neutral: 3–1–0

Coaches and captains
- Head coach: Michael Sisti (21st season)
- Assistant coaches: Beth Hanrahan; Kelley Steadman
- Captain(s): Maggie Knott; Michele Robillard; Alexa Vasko

The Mercyhurst Lakers represented Mercyhurst University in CHA women's ice hockey during the 2019–20 NCAA Division I women's ice hockey season. The Lakers were undefeated on home ice. Mercyhurst won the College Hockey America Tournament with a 2–1 overtime win over regular season champions, Robert Morris. The overtime victory came at 4:19 with a goal from Summer-Rae Dobson. As tournament champions, Mercyhurst earned a berth in the NCAA Tournament to determine the national championship. On March 12, 2020, the NCAA Tournament was cancelled due to the COVID-19 pandemic.

== Offseason ==
Emma Nuutinen was part of the Team Finland IIHF World Championship Team that earned silver medals.

=== Recruiting ===
Player	Position	Nationality	Notes
Aubrey Cole	Defense	Canada	Played with Bluewater Jr. Hawks
Gabrielle Cox	Forward	United States	Defender for the Boston Jr. Eagles
Jordan Mortlock	Defense	Canada	Selected for Team Alberta
Abigail Schauer	Forward	United States	Attended USA National Team Camp twice
Jenna Silvonen	Goaltender	Finland	On Silver Medal Finland Team with Emma Nuutinen
Alexandria Weiss	Defense	United States	Played for Bishop Kearney Selects

== Standings ==
2019–20 College Hockey America standings
	Conference							Overall					
	GP	W	L	T	PTS	GF	GA	GP	W	L	T	GF	GA
#10 Mercyhurst†*	20	13	4	3	29	68	40	34	19	10	5	107	73
Robert Morris	20	13	5	2	28	67	40	34	19	11	4	111	82
Syracuse	20	11	7	2	24	69	40	34	13	19	2	99	89
Penn State	20	7	8	5	19	38	42	36	13	15	8	70	80
RIT	20	5	13	2	12	39	72	34	12	18	4	76	103
Lindenwood	20	3	15	2	8	26	73	33	5	23	5	42	117
Championship: March 7, 2020 † indicates conference regular season champion; * indicates conference tournament champion Rankings: USCHO.com

== Roster ==
=== 2019–20 Lakers ===
No.	Nat.	Player	Class	Pos	Height	DoB	Hometown	Previous team
1		Leah Klassen	Junior	G	5' 4" (1.63 m)		Niagara-on-the-Lake, Ontario	Westminster School
2		Abigail Schauer	Freshman	F	5' 8" (1.73 m)		Grand Forks, North Dakota	Dallas Stars U19
3		Gabrielle Cox	Freshman	F	5' 4" (1.63 m)		Niverville, New York	Boston Jr. Eagles
4		Maggie Knott (C)	Senior	F	5' 11" (1.8 m)		Smith Falls, Ontario	Ottawa Jr. Lady Senators
5		Sam Isbell	Senior	F	5' 7" (1.7 m)		Thunder Bay, Ontario	Whitby Jr. Wolves
6		K.K Thiessen	Junior	D	5' 8" (1.73 m)		Winnipeg, Manitoba	Team Manitoba
7		Summer-Rae Dobson	Junior	F	5' 5" (1.65 m)		Huntsville, Ontario	Ridley Tigers
8		Jordan Mortlock	Freshman	D	5' 7" (1.7 m)		Medicine Hat, Alberta	Pursuit of Excellence
9		Mary Katherine Gialames	Sophomore	D	5' 7" (1.7 m)		Pittsburgh, Pennsylvania	Pittsburgh Penguins Elite
10		Alexa Vasko (C)	Junior	F	5' 5" (1.65 m)		St. Catharines, Ontario	Stoney Creek Sabres
11		Sarah Nelles	Sophomore	F	5' 6" (1.68 m)		St. Anns, Ontario	Stoney Creek Sabres
12		Megan Korzack	Junior	F	5' 2" (1.57 m)		Grimsby, Ontario	Stoney Creek Sabres
13		Claire Werynski	Senior	D	5' 7" (1.7 m)		Williamsville, New York	Gilmour Academy
15		Rachel Marmen	Junior	D	5' 5" (1.65 m)		Oakville, Ontario	LStoney Creek Sabres
16		Michele Robillard (C)	Senior	F	5' 7" (1.7 m)		Orchard Park, New York	Nichols School
19		Emily Pinto	Sophomore	F	5' 3" (1.6 m)		Mississauga, Ontario	Durham West Lightning
20		Emma Nuutinen	Senior	F	5' 9" (1.75 m)		Vantaa, Finland	Finnish National Team
21		Alexane Rheaume	Sophomore	D	5' 6" (1.68 m)		Sherbrooke, Quebec	Champlain Cougars
22		Alexandria Weiss	Freshman	D	5' 6" (1.68 m)		Plover, Wisconsin	Bishop Kearney Selects
23		Aubrey Cole	Freshman	D	5' 11" (1.8 m)		Sarnia, Ontario	Bluewater Jr. Hawks
24		Celine Frappier	Junior (RS)	F	5' 4" (1.63 m)		Tecumseh, Ontario	Toronto Jr. Aeros
29		Kennedy Blair	Junior (RS)	G	5' 6" (1.68 m)		Bismarck, North Dakota	Minnesota Revolution
30		Jenna Silvonen	Freshman	G	5' 5" (1.65 m)		Lohja, Finland	Finnish National Team
34		Liliane Perreault	Sophomore	F	5' 7" (1.7 m)		Hinsdale, Illinois	Chicago Mission

== Schedule ==
Date	Opponent^{#}	Rank^{#}	Site	Decision	Result	Record
Regular Season
October 4	at Colgate*		Class of 1965 Arena • Hamilton, NY	Kennedy Blair	L 1–2	0–1–0
October 5	at Colgate*		Class of 1965 Arena • Hamilton, NY	Kennedy Blair	T 3–3 ^{OT}	0–1–1
October 11	Sacred Heart*		Mercyhurst Ice Center • Erie, PA	Kennedy Blair	W 5–3	1–1–1
October 12	Sacred Heart*		Mercyhurst Ice Center • Erie, PA	Kennedy Blair	W 9–0	2–1–1
October 18	RIT		Mercyhurst Ice Center • Erie, PA	Kennedy Blair	W 4–2	3–1–1 (1–0–0)
October 19	RIT		Mercyhurst Ice Center • Erie, PA	Kennedy Blair	W 6–0	4–1–1 (2–0–0)
October 25	vs. Minnesota Duluth*		LECOM Harborcenter • Buffalo, NY (Ice Breaker Tournament Opening Round)	Kennedy Blair	L 1–4	4–2–1
October 26	vs. Connecticut*		LECOM Harborcenter • Buffalo, NY (Ice Breaker Tournament Consolation Round)	Kennedy Blair	W 3–1	5–2–1
November 1	Lindenwood		Mercyhurst Ice Center • Erie, PA	Kennedy Blair	W 3–0	6–2–1 (3–0–0)
November 2	Lindenwood		Mercyhurst Ice Center • Erie, PA	Kennedy Blair	W 7–2	7–2–1 (4–0–0)
November 15	at #5 Clarkson*		Cheel Arena • Potsdam, NY	Kennedy Blair	L 1–4	7–3–1
November 16	at #5 Clarkson*		Cheel Arena • Potsdam, NY	Kennedy Blair	L 1–2	7–4–1
November 29	Union*		Mercyhurst Ice Center • Erie, PA	Kennedy Blair	W 4–3 ^{OT}	8–4–1
November 30	Union*		Mercyhurst Ice Center • Erie, PA	Jenna Silvonen	W 2–0	9–4–1
December 6	at #10 Robert Morris		Colonials Arena • Neville, Township, PA	Kennedy Blair	W 5–2	10–4–1 (5–0–0)
December 7	at #10 Robert Morris		Colonials Arena • Neville, Township, PA	Kennedy Blair	L 1–3	10–5–1 (5–1–0)
December 13	St. Cloud State*		Mercyhurst Ice Center • Erie, PA	Kennedy Blair	W 4–1	11–5–1
December 14	St. Cloud State*		Mercyhurst Ice Center • Erie, PA	Kennedy Blair	T 2–2 ^{OT}	11–5–2
January 4, 2020	at #4 Cornell*		Lynah Rink • Ithaca, NY	Kennedy Blair	L 2–6	11–6–2
January 5	at #4 Cornell*		Lynah Rink • Ithaca, NY	Jenna Silvonen	L 1–2 ^{OT}	11–7–2
January 10	at Syracuse		Tennity Ice Skating Pavilion • Syracuse, NY	Jenna Silvonen	L 3–8	11–8–2 (5–2–0)
January 11	at Syracuse		Tennity Ice Skating Pavilion • Syracuse, NY	Kennedy Blair	W 4–3 ^{OT}	12–8–2 (6–2–0)
January 17	Penn State		Mercyhurst Ice Center • Erie, PA	Kennedy Blair	T 1–1 ^{OT}	12–8–3 (6–2–1)
January 18	Penn State		Mercyhurst Ice Center • Erie, PA	Jenna Silvonen	T 1–1 ^{OT}	12–8–4 (6–2–2)
January 24	at RIT		Gene Polisseni Center • Rochester, NY	Kennedy Blair	W 5–2	13–8–4 (7–2–2)
January 25	at RIT		Gene Polisseni Center • Rochester, NY	Kennedy Blair	W 5–2	14–8–4 (8–2–2)
February 7	at Lindenwood		Centene Community Ice Center • Maryland Heights, MO	Kennedy Blair	L 2–3	14–9–4 (8–3–2)
February 8	at Lindenwood		Centene Community Ice Center • Maryland Heights, MO	Jenna Silvonen	W 1–0	15–9–4 (9–3–2)
February 14	Robert Morris		Mercyhurst Ice Center • Erie, PA	Jenna Silvonen	W 5–3	16–9–4 (10–3–2)
February 15	Robert Morris		Mercyhurst Ice Center • Erie, PA	Jenna Silvonen	T 5–5 ^{OT}	16–9–5 (10–3–3)
February 21	Syracuse		Mercyhurst Ice Center • Erie, PA	Jenna Silvonen	W 6–2	17–9–5 (11–3–3)
February 22	Syracuse		Mercyhurst Ice Center • Erie, PA	Kennedy Blair	W 1–0	18–9–5 (12–3–3)
February 28	at Penn State		Pegula Ice Arena • University Park, PA	Kennedy Blair	W 3–0	19–9–5 (13–3–3)
February 29	at Penn State		Pegula Ice Arena • University Park, PA	Kennedy Blair	L 0–2	19–10–5 (13–4–3)
CHA Tournament
March 6	vs. Penn State*		LECOM Harborcenter • Buffalo, NY (Semifinal Game)	Kennedy Blair	W 4–1	20–10–5
March 7	vs. Robert Morris*		LECOM Harborcenter • Buffalo, NY (Championship Game)	Kennedy Blair	W 2–1 ^{OT}	21–10–5
NCAA Tournament
March 14	at #1 Cornell*	#10	Lynah Rink • Ithaca, NY (Quarterfinal Game)	Cancelled		(21–10–5)
*Non-conference game. ^{#}Rankings from USCHO.com Poll.

== Awards and honors ==
Forward Emma Nuutinen was named the College Hockey America Player of the year. Nuutinen, an olympic bronze medalist with Finland, scored 16 goals and 30 points in her senior year.

Fellow senior forward Michele Robillard joined Nuutinen on the CHA All-Conference First Team. Maggie Knott and Sam Isbell were named to the Second All-Conference Team.

Mike Sisti was named Coach of the Year, and Alexa Vasko was named Defensive Forward of the year.

Following the CHA Tournament, Kennedy Blair won the Tournament MVP, while Summer-Rae Dobson and Jordan Mortlock joined her in the All-Tournament team.
