= 2019–20 Penn State Nittany Lions women's ice hockey season =

- Conference: 4th College Hockey America
- Home ice: Pegula Ice Arena

Record
- Overall: 13-15-8
- Conference: 7-8-5
- Home: 8-6-2
- Road: 4-7-6
- Neutral: 1-2-0

Coaches and captains
- Head coach: Jeff Kampersal (3rd season)
- Assistant coaches: Allison Coomey; Celeste Brown
- Alternate captain(s): Jessica Adolfsson, Natalie Heising, Brooke Madsen, Amanda McLeod, Kate Rydland, Abby Welch

The 2020–21 Penn State Nittany Lions women's Hockey Team represented Penn State University in CHA women's ice hockey during the 2019-20 NCAA Division I women's ice hockey season. The season was Jeff Kampersal's third as head coach, and the team has established itself as a competitive program under his tutelage. The Nittany Lions were challenged by the season ending injury to goaltender, Jenna Brenneman, during the first weekend of play. Brenneman had the eighth best Goals Asainst Average in the nation in 2018–19. In her absence, junior Chantal Burke emerged as one of the nation's best netminders, assisted by a strong corps of defenders, including freshman Mallory Uihlein, a promising player for Team USA.

== Offseason ==
Natalie Heising was invited to the 2019 USA Hockey Women's National Festival In Lake Placid, in August. It was Heisings second consecutive invitation.

== Standings ==
2019–20 College Hockey America standings
	Conference							Overall					
	GP	W	L	T	PTS	GF	GA	GP	W	L	T	GF	GA
#10 Mercyhurst†*	20	13	4	3	29	68	40	34	19	10	5	107	73
Robert Morris	20	13	5	2	28	67	40	34	19	11	4	111	82
Syracuse	20	11	7	2	24	69	40	34	13	19	2	99	89
Penn State	20	7	8	5	19	38	42	36	13	15	8	70	80
RIT	20	5	13	2	12	39	72	34	12	18	4	76	103
Lindenwood	20	3	15	2	8	26	73	33	5	23	5	42	117
Championship: March 7, 2020 † indicates conference regular season champion; * indicates conference tournament champion Rankings: USCHO.com

=== Recruiting ===
.

Player	Position	Nationality	Notes
Julie Gough	Forward	Canada	Played for the Durham West Lightning
Mikayla Lantto	Forward	United States	Played for Detroit Belle Tire
Mallory Uihlein	Defense	United States	Represented USA in IIHF U18 Championships
Rachel Weiss	Defense	Canada	Represented Canada in IIHF U18 Championships

== Roster ==
=== 2019–20 Nittany Lions ===
No.	Nat.	Player	Class	Pos	Height	DoB	Hometown	Previous team
2		Shea Nelson	Junior	F	5' 8" (1.73 m)		Evanston, Illinois	Chicago Mission
5		Brooke Madsen (A)	Senior	D	5' 6" (1.68 m)		Eagan, Minnesota	Team USA U18
9		Morgan Rolph	Junior	D	5' 11" (1.8 m)		Mitchell, Ontario	Kitchener-Waterloo Rangers
10		Abby Welch (A)	Senior	F	5' 7" (1.7 m)		East Amherst, New York	Nichols School
12		Loli Fidler	Sophomore	F	5' 9" (1.75 m)		Edina, Minnesota	Edina HS
13		Rene Gangarosa	Sophomore	D	5' 10" (1.78 m)		Rochester, New York	Niagara Jr. Purple Eagles
14		Julie Gough	Freshman	F	5' 8" (1.73 m)		Newcastle, Ontario	Durham West Jr. Lightning
15		Jessica Adolfsson (A)	Sophomore	D	5' 9" (1.75 m)		Linköping, Sweden	Swedish National Team
16		Katie McMillan	Senior	F	5' 4" (1.63 m)		Minnetonka, Minnesota	Minnetonka HS
17		Sophie Slattery	Junior	F	5' 7" (1.7 m)		Edina, Minnesota	Edina HS
18		Amy Dobson	Sophomore	D	5' 6" (1.68 m)		Hamilton, Ontario	Oakville Jr. Hornets
19		Katie Rankin	Junior	F	5' 9" (1.75 m)		Kanata, Ontario	Nepean Jr. Wildcats
20		Natalie Heising (A)	Junior	F	5' 5" (1.65 m)		Maple Grove, Minnesota	Wayzata HS
21		Anna Promersberger	Sophomore	F	5' 8" (1.73 m)		Fargo, North Dakota	Shattuck-St. Mary's
22		Olivia Villani	Senior	D	5' 10" (1.78 m)		Pittsburgh, Pennsylvania	East Coast Wizards
23		Kate Rydland (A)	Senior	D	5' 9" (1.75 m)		Eden Prairie, Minnesota	Eden Prairie HS
25		Amanda McLeod (A)	Senior	F	5' 7" (1.7 m)		Calgary, Alberta	Edge School
26		Mallory Uihlein	Freshman	D	5' 7" (1.7 m)		Edina, Minnesota	Team USA U18
27		Izzy Heminger	Sophomore	D	5' 4" (1.63 m)		Dublin, Ohio	Ohio AAA Blue Jackets
28		Mikayla Lantto	Freshman	F	5' 10" (1.78 m)		Palmer, Alaska	Detroit Belle Tire
29		Rachel Weiss	Freshman	F	5' 7" (1.7 m)		Calgary, Alberta	Team Canada U18
32		Cam Leonard	Sophomore (RS)	G	5' 7" (1.7 m)		Cary, North Carolina	Choate-Rosemary Hall
33		Chantal Burke	Junior	G	5' 9" (1.75 m)		Saskatoon, Saskatchewan	Regina Rebels
35		Jenna Brenneman	Senior	G	5' 7" (1.7 m)		Eagan, Minnesota	Clarkson

== Schedule ==
Date	Opponent^{#}	Rank^{#}	Site	Decision	Result	Record
Regular Season
September 27	at Holy Cross*		Hart Center • Worcester, MA	Jenna Brenneman	T 3–3 ^{OT}	0–0–1
September 28	at Holy Cross*		Hart Center • Worcester, MA	Chantal Burke	T 1–1 ^{OT}	0–0–2
October 4	at #1 Wisconsin*		LaBahn Arena • Madison, WI	Chantal Burke	L 0–7	0–1–2
October 5	at #1 Wisconsin*		LaBahn Arena • Madison, WI	Chantal Burke	L 0–3	0–2–2
October 11	Rensselaer*		Pegula Ice Arena • University Park, PA	Chantal Burke	W 2–0	1–2–2
October 12	Rensselaer*		Pegula Ice Arena • University Park, PA	Chantal Burke	W 3–0	2–2–2
October 18	at Providence*		Schneider Arena • Providence, RI	Chantal Burke	W 4–2	3–2–2
October 19	at Providence*		Schneider Arena • Providence, RI	Chantal Burke	T 2–2 ^{OT}	3–2–3
October 25	#10 Boston University*		Pegula Ice Arena • University Park, PA	Cam Leonard	L 2–5	3–3–3
October 26	#10 Boston University*		Pegula Ice Arena • University Park, PA	Cam Leonard	L 1–5	3–4–3
November 1	at Robert Morris		Colonials Arena • Neville Township, PA	Cam Leonard	L 2–5	3–5–3 (0–1–0)
November 2	at Robert Morris		Colonials Arena • Neville Township, PA	Cam Leonard	L 0–5	3–6–3 (0–2–0)
November 23	Syracuse		Pegula Ice Arena • University Park, PA	Chantal Burke	T 1–1 ^{OT}	3–6–4 (0–2–1)
November 24	Syracuse		Pegula Ice Arena • University Park, PA	Chantal Burke	L 1–3	3–7–4 (0–3–1)
November 29	at Vermont*		Gutterson Fieldhouse • Burlington, VT (Windjammer Classic, Opening Round)	Chantal Burke	W 4–0	4–7–4
November 30	vs. #7 Clarkson*		Gutterson Fieldhouse • Burlington, VT (Windjammer Classic, Championship)	Chantal Burke	L 1–3	4–8–4
December 6	RIT		Pegula Ice Arena • University Park, PA	Chantal Burke	W 3–0	5–8–4 (1–3–1)
December 7	RIT		Pegula Ice Arena • University Park, PA	Chantal Burke	W 6–2	6–8–4 (2–3–1)
January 3, 2020	New Hampshire*		Pegula Ice Arena • University Park, PA	Chantal Burke	W 3–0	7–8–4
January 4	New Hampshire*		Pegula Ice Arena • University Park, PA	Chantal Burke	L 1–2	7–9–4
January 10	Lindenwood		Pegula Ice Arena • University Park, PA	Chantal Burke	W 2–1	8–9–4 (3–3–1)
January 11	Lindenwood		Pegula Ice Arena • University Park, PA	Chantal Burke	W 3–2	9–9–4 (4–3–1)
January 17	at Mercyhurst		Mercyhurst Ice Center • Erie, PA	Chantal Burke	T 1–1 ^{OT}	9–9–5 (4–3–2)
January 18	at Mercyhurst		Mercyhurst Ice Center • Erie, PA	Chantal Burke	T 1–1 ^{OT}	9–9–6 (4–3–3)
January 24	at Syracuse		Tennity Ice Skating Pavilion • Syracuse, NY	Chantal Burke	W 1–0	10–9–6 (5–3–3)
January 25	at Syracuse		Tennity Ice Skating Pavilion • Syracuse, NY	Chantal Burke	L 1–3	10–10–6 (5–4–3)
February 7	Robert Morris		Pegula Ice Arena • University Park, PA	Chantal Burke	L 1–3	10–11–6 (5–5–3)
February 8	Robert Morris		Pegula Ice Arena • University Park, PA	Chantal Burke	T 2–2 ^{OT}	10–11–7 (5–5–4)
February 14	at RIT		Gene Polisseni Center • Rochester, NY	Chantal Burke	L 2–4	10–12–7 (5–6–4)
February 15	at RIT		Gene Polisseni Center • Rochester, NY	Chantal Burke	L 3–4	10–13–7 (5–7–4)
February 21	at Lindenwood		Centene Community Ice Center • Maryland Heights, MO	Chantal Burke	T 1–1 ^{OT}	10–13–8 (5–7–5)
February 22	at Lindenwood		Centene Community Ice Center • Maryland Heights, MO	Chantal Burke	W 5–1	11–13–8 (6–7–5)
February 28	Mercyhurst		Pegula Ice Arena • University Park, PA	Chantal Burke	L 0–3	11–14–8 (6–8–5)
February 29	Mercyhurst		Pegula Ice Arena • University Park, PA	Chantal Burke	W 2–0	12–14–8 (7–8–5)
CHA Tournament
March 5	vs. RIT*		LECOM Harborcenter • Buffalo, NY (Quarterfinal Game)	Chantal Burke	W 4-1	13–14–8
March 6	vs. Mercyhurst*		LECOM Harborcenter • Buffalo, NY (Semifinal Game)	Chantal Burke	L 1-4	13–15–8
*Non-conference game. ^{#}Rankings from USCHO.com Poll.

== Awards and honors ==
Junior goaltender Chantal Burke was named the CHA All-Conference First Team amassing seven shutouts in 32 games played a .937 Goals Against Average and 1.69 Goals per game, each category among the top ten in the nation.

Sophomore defender Izzy Heminger was named to the All-Conference Second Team, and defender Mallory Uihlen was named to the All-Rookie Team.

Following the CHA Tournament, Junior Forward Natalie Heising was named to the All-Tournament team with a hat trick in the quarterfinal game against RIT.
