= 2020 CHA women's ice hockey tournament =

2020 College Hockey America women's ice hockey tournament
- Dates: March 5–7, 2020
- Teams: 6
- Finals site: LECOM Harborcenter; Buffalo, New York
- Champions: Mercyhurst (13th title)
- Winning coach: Michael Sisti (13th title)
- College Hockey America women's Ice Hockey Tournaments

The 2020 College Hockey America Women's Ice Hockey Tournament was the 18th tournament in league history played between March 5 and March 7, 2020, at the LECOM Harborcenter in Buffalo, New York. Mercyhurst won their 13th tournament and earned College Hockey America's automatic bid into the 2020 NCAA National Collegiate Women's Ice Hockey Tournament. The NCAA Tournament was cancelled due to the coronavirus pandemic.

== Format ==
All six CHA teams participated in the tournament. On the first day of the tournament, the top two seeds received a bye, while the #3 seed played the #6 seed, and the #4 seed played the #5 seed in the quarterfinal round. On the second day, the semifinal games featured the #1 seed against the lower remaining seed, while the #2 seed played the higher remaining seed. On the third and final day, the CHA championship was played between the two semifinal winners. There was a total of five games.

=== Standings ===
2019–20 College Hockey America standings
	Conference							Overall					
	GP	W	L	T	PTS	GF	GA	GP	W	L	T	GF	GA
#10 Mercyhurst†*	20	13	4	3	29	68	40	34	19	10	5	107	73
Robert Morris	20	13	5	2	28	67	40	34	19	11	4	111	82
Syracuse	20	11	7	2	24	69	40	34	13	19	2	99	89
Penn State	20	7	8	5	19	38	42	36	13	15	8	70	80
RIT	20	5	13	2	12	39	72	34	12	18	4	76	103
Lindenwood	20	3	15	2	8	26	73	33	5	23	5	42	117
Championship: March 7, 2020 † indicates conference regular season champion; * indicates conference tournament champion Rankings: USCHO.com

Round	Match	Name	Team 1		Team 2
1	March 5	Quarterfinal 1 (#3 v. #6)	Syracuse 4	v	Lindenwood 0
2	March 5	Quarterfinal 2 (#4 v. #5)	Penn State 4	v	RIT 1
3	March 6	Semifinal 1 (#1 v. #4)	Mercyhurst 4	v	Penn State 1
4	March 6	Semifinal 2 (#2 v. #3)	Robert Morris 5	v	Syracuse 2
5	March 7	Championship Game	Mercyhurst 2	v	Robert Morris 1*

Tournament Champion: Mercyhurst

Note: * denotes overtime period(s)

The tournament MVP was Mercyhurst goaltender Kennedy Blair, making 31 saves in the overtime championship game.

Syracuse junior forward Victoria Klimek, Penn State junior Natalie Heising, Mercyhurst junior forward Summer-Rae Dobson, Robert Morris senior defender Sarah Lecavalier, and Mercyhurst freshman defender Jordan Mortlock joined Blair on the 2020 all-tournament team.

The tournament champion earned a berth in the NCAA Tournament to determine the national champion. The Mercyhurst Lakers were the number 8 seed out of 8 in the tournament and were set to face #1 seed Cornell on March 14 in Ithaca, New York, prior to the cancellation.
