= 2019–20 Yale Bulldogs women's ice hockey season =

- Conference: 5 ECAC Hockey
- Home ice: Ingalls Rink

Record
- Overall: 17–15–0

Coaches and captains
- Head coach: Mark Bolding
- Assistant coaches: Matt Woodard; Amanda Boulier

The Yale Bulldogs represented Yale University in ECAC women's ice hockey during the 2019–20 NCAA Division I women's ice hockey season. They finished the season with a 17–15–0 record, a then program record for most wins in one season. This was the team's first season under new head coach Mark Bolding.

== Regular season ==
=== Standings ===
- 2019–20 ECAC Hockey standings
  	Conference							Overall					
  	GP	W	L	T	PTS	GF	GA	GP	W	L	T	GF	GA
  #1 Cornell	22	19	0	3	41	84	16	31	27	1	3	121	28
  #6 Princeton	22	17	4	1	35	77	40	31	24	6	1	114	54
  #7 Clarkson	22	14	4	4	32	63	29	36	25	5	6	110	50
  Harvard	22	15	6	1	31	69	53	32	18	13	1	93	85
  Yale	22	13	9	0	26	53	49	32	17	15	0	86	81
  Colgate	22	11	8	3	25	71	43	38	17	15	6	110	84
  #10 Quinnipiac	22	11	9	2	24	63	43	37	20	14	3	104	70
  St. Lawrence	22	8	10	4	20	34	43	36	13	16	7	73	83
  Union	22	5	14	3	13	39	74	34	5	24	5	52	115
  Dartmouth	22	4	15	3	11	36	70	29	7	19	3	52	91
  Brown	22	2	18	2	6	24	85	29	3	23	3	33	119
  RPI	22	0	22	0	0	14	82	34	0	33	1	21	122
  Championship: March 10, 2020 † indicates conference regular season champion; * indicates conference tournament champion Rankings: USCHO.com

=== Schedule ===
Date	Opponent^{#}	Rank^{#}	Site	Decision	Result	Record
Regular Season
October 25	Long Island University Sharks		New Haven, Connecticut	Tera Hoffman (W, 1)	W 9-2	1-0-0 (0-0-0)
October 26	Long Island University Sharks		New Haven, Connecticut	Gianna Meloni (W, 1)	W 5-1	2-0-0 (0-0-0)
November 1	at Dartmouth Big Green		Hanover, New Hampshire	Tera Hoffman (W, 2)	W 1-0	3-0-0 (1-0-0)
*Non-conference game. ^{#}Rankings from USCHO.com Poll.

== Roster ==
=== 2019-20 Bulldogs ===
No.	Nat.	Player	Class	Pos	Height	DoB	Hometown	Previous team
3		Laura Anderson	Senior	F	5' 9" (1.75 m)		Lino Lakes, Minnesota	Hill-Murray School
4		Elle Hartje	Freshman	F	5' 5" (1.65 m)		Detroit, Michigan	Detroit Country Day
5		Lucy Burton	Junior	F	5' 6" (1.68 m)		Minneapolis, Minnesota	Blake School
7		Greta Skarzynski	Junior	D	5' 7" (1.7 m)		Lake Forest, Illinois	Loyola Academy
8		Tabea Botthof	Sophomore	D	5' 9" (1.75 m)		Erding, Germany	Kent School
