= 2019–20 Cornell Big Red women's ice hockey season =

NCAA Tournament, Qualified
- Conference: ECAC

Rankings
- USA Today/USA Hockey Magazine: 1
- USCHO.com: 1

Record
- Overall: 28-2-3
- Conference: 19-0-3
- Home: 17-1-1
- Road: 11-1-2

Coaches and captains
- Head coach: Doug Derraugh
- Assistant coaches: Edith Racine; Dean Jackson; Dane Schreiner

The Cornell Big Red represented Cornell University in ECAC women's ice hockey during the 2019–20 NCAA Division I women's ice hockey season. Hosting the 2020 ECAC tournament championship game, the Big Red lost to the visiting Princeton Tigers by a 3–2 mark in overtime. Qualifying for the 2020 NCAA National Collegiate Women's Ice Hockey Tournament, the Big Red were scheduled to face off against the Mercyhurst Lakers in the opening round, but the event was cancelled due to the COVID-19 pandemic.

== Offseason ==
=== Recruiting ===
Player	Position	Nationality	Notes
Kaitlyn Isaac	D	Canada	Played with Team Ontario in the U18 Women's National Championships, gaining a silver medal
Izzy Daniel	F	United States	Named a 2019 Minnesota Ms. Hockey Finalist

== Regular season ==
=== Schedule ===
Date	Opponent^{#}	Rank^{#}	Site	Decision	Result	Record
Regular Season
October 25	RMU Colonials		Lynah Rink • Ithaca, New York	Lindsay Browning	W 6-0	1-0-0 (0-0-0)
October 26	RMU Colonials		Lynah Rink • Ithaca, New York	Lindsay Browning	W 3-0	2-0-0 (0-0-0)
November 2	Princeton Tigers	#3	Lynah Rink • Ithaca, NY	Lindsay Browning	W 1-0	
December 6	at #4 Princeton Tigers	#4	Hobey Baker Rink • Princeton, NJ	Lindsay Browning	W 5-1	
Postseason
February 28	St. Lawrence Saints		Lynah Rink • Ithaca, New York	Lindsay Browning	W 7-2	
February 29	St. Lawrence Saints		Lynah Rink • Ithaca, New York	Lindsay Browning	W 3-2	
March 7	Harvard Crimson		Lynah Rink • Ithaca, New York	Lindsay Browning	W 4-0	28-1-3
March 8	Princeton Tigers		Lynah Rink • Ithaca, New York	Stephanie Neatby (PU)	L 3-2 ^{OT}	28-2-3
*Non-conference game. ^{#}Rankings from USCHO.com Poll.

== Roster ==
=== 2019-20 Big Red ===
No.	Nat.	Player	Class	Pos	Height	DoB	Hometown	Previous team
3		Taylor Pietrowski	Sophomore	D	5' 8" (1.73 m)		Orchard Park, New York	Niagara Purple Eagles
4		Kendra Nealey	Junior	D	5' 11" (1.8 m)		Chicago, Illinois	Chicago Mission
5		Grace Graham	Senior	F	5' 8" (1.73 m)		Island View, New Brunswick	Fredericton High School
6		Joie Phelps		F	5' 7" (1.7 m)		Eagan, Minnesota	Visitation High School
7		Kaitlyn Isaac	Freshman	D	5' 4" (1.63 m)		Wallaceburg, Ontario	Wallaceburg District High School
8		Micah Zandee-Hart	Senior	F	5' 9" (1.75 m)		Saanichton, British Columbia	Okangan Hockey Academy
9		Devon Facchinato	Junior	F	5' 10" (1.78 m)		Windsor, Ontario	Appleby College
10		Samantha Burke	Sophomore	F	5' 10" (1.78 m)		Eden Prairie, Minnesota	Convent of the Visitation
11		Gillis Frechette	Sophomore	F	5' 6" (1.68 m)		Weston, Massachusetts	East Coast Wizards
12		Izzy Daniel	Freshman	F	5' 5" (1.65 m)		Minneapolis, Minnesota	The Blake School
13		Bella Kang	Sophomore	F	5' 7" (1.7 m)		Los Gatos, California	East Coast Wizards
14		Jaime Bourbonnais	Senior	F	5' 4" (1.63 m)		Mississauga, Ontario	Canada women's national under-18 ice hockey team
16		Athena Song	Sophomore	F	5' 6" (1.68 m)		Ames, Iowa	St. Louis Lady Blues
17		Paige Kenyon	Freshman	F	5' 9" (1.75 m)		Ancaster, Ontario	Stoney Creek Jr. Sabres (PWHL)
18		Paige Lewis	Senior	F	5' 5" (1.65 m)		New Canaan, Connecticut	North American Hockey Academy
19		Elana Zingas	Freshman	F	5' 7" (1.7 m)		Grosse Pointe Farms, Michigan	Belle Tire U19
20		Kristin O'Neill	Senior	F	5' 4" (1.63 m)		Oakville, Ontario	Stoney Creek Jr. Sabres9 (PWHL)
21		Amy Curlew	Senior	F	5' 3" (1.6 m)		Happy-Valley Goose Bay, Newfoundland	Oakville Hornets (PWHL)
22		Maddie Mills	Senior	F	5' 4" (1.63 m)		Sewickley, Pennsylvania	Shattuck St. Marys
23		Finley Frechette	Junior	F	5' 5" (1.65 m)		Weston, Massachusetts	East Coast Wizards
24		Sydney Breza	Freshman	F	5' 9" (1.75 m)		Minnetrista, Minnesota	Breck School
26		Ellie Zweber	Freshman	F	5' 5" (1.65 m)		Santa Barbara, California	Selects Hockey Academy U19
27		Willow Slobodzian	Junior	D	5' 6" (1.68 m)		Clavet, Saskatchewan	Saskatoon Stars
29		Lindsay Browning	Junior	G	5' 3" (1.6 m)		Penfield, New York	Buffalo Bisons
31		Ally Dalaya	Junior	G	5' 10" (1.78 m)		Fort Hunt, Virginia	Washington Pride

== Awards and honors ==
- Jaime Bourbonnais, 2019-20 CCM Hockey Women's Division I All-American: First Team
- Lindsay Browning, 2019-20 CCM Hockey Women's Division I All-American: Second Team
- Lindsay Browning, 2019-20 Ivy League Player of the Year
- Izzy Daniel, 2019-20 Ivy League Rookie of the Year
- Doug Derraugh, 2020 CCM/AHCA Women's National Collegiate Coach of the Year

=== All-Ivy honorees ===
- First Team All-Ivy
  - Kristin O'Neill, Cornell
  - Micah Zandee-Hart, Cornell
  - Jaime Bourbonnais, Cornell
  - Lindsay Browning, Cornell
- Second Team All-Ivy
  - Maddie Mills
