= 2019–20 Robert Morris Colonials women's ice hockey season =

- Conference: 2nd College Hockey America
- Home ice: Colonials Arena

Record
- Overall: 20–12–4
- Conference: 13–5–2
- Home: 11–6–1
- Road: 8–5–3
- Neutral: 1–1–0

Coaches and captains
- Head coach: Paul Colontino (9th season)
- Assistant coaches: Logan Bittle; Jen Kindret
- Captain: Jacee Gephard
- Alternate captain(s): Sarah Lecavalier; Natalie Marcuzzi; Lexi Templeman

The Robert Morris Colonials women represented Robert Morris University in CHA women's ice hockey during the 2019–20 NCAA Division I women's ice hockey season.

== Offseason ==
- 7/23: Incoming freshman Goalie Raygan Kirk was the youngest player to be invited to the Canadian National Women's Development Camp.
- 8/27: Former RMU star Jen Kindret was added to the coaching staff.

== Standings ==
2019–20 College Hockey America standings
	Conference							Overall					
	GP	W	L	T	PTS	GF	GA	GP	W	L	T	GF	GA
#10 Mercyhurst†*	20	13	4	3	29	68	40	34	19	10	5	107	73
Robert Morris	20	13	5	2	28	67	40	34	19	11	4	111	82
Syracuse	20	11	7	2	24	69	40	34	13	19	2	99	89
Penn State	20	7	8	5	19	38	42	36	13	15	8	70	80
RIT	20	5	13	2	12	39	72	34	12	18	4	76	103
Lindenwood	20	3	15	2	8	26	73	33	5	23	5	42	117
Championship: March 7, 2020 † indicates conference regular season champion; * indicates conference tournament champion Rankings: USCHO.com

== Roster ==
=== 2019–20 Colonials ===
No.	Nat.	Player	Class	Pos	Height	DoB	Hometown	Previous team
1		Raygan Kirk	Freshman	G	5' 8" (1.73 m)		Ste. Anne, Manitoba	Team Canada U-18
3		Gillian Thompson	Sophomore	D	5' 9" (1.75 m)		Toronto, Ontario	Toronto Jr. Aeros
4		Allyson Hebert	Freshman	D	5' 8" (1.73 m)		St. Andrews West, Ontario	Ottawa Lady Senators
5		Emily Curlett	Junior	D	5' 5" (1.65 m)		Lapeer, Michigan	Little Caesars U19
6		Janey Sandoval	Junior	F	5' 5" (1.65 m)		West Fargo, North Dakota	Minnesota Revolution
7		Wasyn Rice	Sophomore	D	5' 7" (1.7 m)		Invermere, British Columbia	Ontario Hockey Academy
9		Maggy Burbidge	Freshman	F	5' 4" (1.63 m)		Falmouth, Nova Scotia	Nepean Wildcats
10		Lexi Templeman (A)	Junior	F	5' 2" (1.57 m)		Staffa, Ontario	Kitchener Waterloo Rangers
11		Alison Rodgers	Junior	F	5' 8" (1.73 m)		Oswego, New York	Minnesota Duluth
12		Leah Marino	Sophomore	F	5' 9" (1.75 m)		South Lake Tahoe, California	North American Hockey Academy
14		Courtney Kollman	Sophomore	F	5' 4" (1.63 m)		Calgary, Alberta	Edge School
15		Sarah Lecavalier (A)	Senior	F	5' 4" (1.63 m)		Strathmore, Alberta	U North Dakota
16		Michaela Boyle	Sophomore (RS)	F	5' 3" (1.6 m)		Reading, Massachusetts	Clarkson
17		Jaycee Gephard (C)	Senior	F	5' 3" (1.6 m)		Plenty, Saskatchewan	Team Canada U18
18		Mackenzie Krasowski	Sophomore	F	5' 8" (1.73 m)		Keswick, Ontario	Toronto Jr. Aeros
19		Marah Wagner	Freshman	F	5' 4" (1.63 m)		Langley, British Columbia	North American Hockey Academy
21		Kyleigh Hanzlik	Sophomore (RS)	F	5' 9" (1.75 m)		Wisconsin Rapids, Wisconsin	University of Wisconsin
22		Emilie Harley	Junior	F	6' 0" (1.83 m)		Syracuse, New York	Ontario Hockey Academy
24		Anjelica Diffendal	Junior	F	6' 0" (1.83 m)		Pittsburgh, Pennsylvania	Pittsburgh Penguins Elite
25		Joelle Fiala	Freshman	F	5' 7" (1.7 m)		Clavet, Saskatchewan	Saskatoon Stars
26		Anna Fairman	Freshman	D	5' 6" (1.68 m)		Troy, Michigan	Belle Tire
27		Natalie Marcuzzi (A)	Senior	F	5' 7" (1.7 m)		Thornhill, Ontario	Mississauga Jr. Chiefs
30		Molly Singewald	Junior	G	5' 4" (1.63 m)		Farmington, Minnesota	Culver Prep
35		Arielle Desmet	Sophomore	G	5' 4" (1.63 m)		Charlotte, Vermont	North American Hockey Academy

== 2019–20 schedule ==
Date	Opponent^{#}	Rank^{#}	Site	Decision	Result	Record
Regular season
September 27	Union*		Colonials Arena • Neville Township, PA	Raygan Kirk	W 6-1	1–0–0
September 28	Union*		Colonials Arena • Neville Township, PA	A. DeSmet	W 5-0	2–0–0
October 11	#2 Minnesota*		Colonials Arena • Neville Township, PA	Raygan Kirk	L 3-4	2–1–0
October 12	#2 Minnesota*		Colonials Arena • Neville Township, PA	A. DeSmet	L 2-6	2–2–0
October 18	#4 Clarkson*	#10	Colonials Arena • Neville Township, PA	A. DeSmet	T 3-3 ^{OT}	2–2–1
October 19	#4 Clarkson*	#10	Colonials Arena • Neville Township, PA	A. DeSmet	L 5-6	2–3–1
October 25	at #5 Cornell*	#8	Lynah Rink • Ithaca, NY	Raygan Kirk	L 0-6	2–4–1
October 26	at #5 Cornell*	#8	Lynah Rink • Ithaca, NY	A. DeSmet	L 0-3	2–5–1
November 1	Penn State		Colonials Arena • Neville Township, PA	Raygan Kirk	W 5-2	3–5–1 (1–0–0)
November 2	Penn State		Colonials Arena • Neville Township, PA	Raygan Kirk	W 5-0	4–5–1 (2–0–0)
November 8	at Lindenwood		Centene Community Ice Center • Maryland Heights, MO	Raygan Kirk	W 2-0	5–5–1 (3–0–0)
November 9	at Lindenwood		Centene Community Ice Center • Maryland Heights, MO	A. DeSmet	W 4-3	6–5–1 (4–0–0)
November 23	at Rensselaer*		Houston Field House • Troy, NY	Raygan Kirk	W 3-1	7–5–1
November 24	at Rensselaer*		Houston Field House • Troy, NY	A. DeSmet	W 6-1	8–5–1
November 29	at St. Lawrence*		Appleton Arena • Canton, NY	Raygan Kirk	W 3-2	9–5–1
November 30	at St. Lawrence*		Appleton Arena • Canton, NY	A. DeSmet	T 1-1 ^{OT}	9–5–2
December 6	Mercyhurst	#10	Colonials Arena • Neville Township, PA	A. DeSmet	L 2-5	9–6–2 (4–1–0)
December 7	Mercyhurst	#10	Colonials Arena • Neville Township, PA	A. DeSmet	W 3-1	10–6–2 (5–1–0)
January 4, 2020	#1 Wisconsin*		UPMC Lemieux Sports Complex • Cranberry Township, PA (Battle at the Burgh, opening round)	Raygan Kirk	L 1-3	10–7–2
January 5	Colgate*		UPMC Lemieux Sports Complex • Cranberry Township, PA (Battle at the Burgh, consolation game)	Raygan Kirk	W 6-5	11–7–2
January 10	at RIT		Gene Polisseni Center • Rochester, NY	Raygan Kirk	L 1-2	11–8–2 (5–2–0)
January 11	at RIT		Gene Polisseni Center • Rochester, NY	A. DeSmet	W 6-4	12–8–2 (6–2–0)
January 17	Syracuse		Colonials Arena • Neville Township, PA	Raygan Kirk	W 5-1	13–8–2 (7–2–0)
January 18	Syracuse		Colonials Arena • Neville Township, PA	Raygan Kirk	L 0-1	13–9–2 (7–3–0)
January 24	Lindenwood		Colonials Arena • Neville Township, PA	Raygan Kirk	W 3-0	14–9–2 (8–3–0)
January 25	Lindenwood		Colonials Arena • Neville Township, PA	Raygan Kirk	W 4-1	15–9–2 (9–3–0)
February 7	at Penn State		Pegula Ice Arena • University Park, PA	Raygan Kirk	W 3-1	16–9–2 (10–3–0)
February 8	at Penn State		Pegula Ice Arena • University Park, PA	A. DeSmet	T 2-2 ^{OT}	16–9–3 (10–3–1)
February 14	at Mercyhurst		Mercyhurst Ice Center • Erie, PA	Raygan Kirk	L 3-5	16–10–3 (10–4–1)
February 15	at Mercyhurst		Mercyhurst Ice Center • Erie, PA	Raygan Kirk	T 5-5 ^{OT}	16–10–4 (10–4–2)
February 21	RIT		Colonials Arena • Neville Township, PA	Raygan Kirk	W 5-1	17–10–4 (11–4–2)
February 22	RIT		Colonials Arena • Neville Township, PA	Raygan Kirk	W 5-2	18–10–4 (12–4–2)
February 28	at Syracuse		Tennity Ice Skating Pavilion • Syracuse, NY	Raygan Kirk	W 2-0	19–10–4 (13–4–2)
February 29	at Syracuse		Tennity Ice Skating Pavilion • Syracuse, NY	Raygan Kirk	L 2-4	19–11–4 (13–5–2)
CHA tournament
March 6	vs. Syracuse*		LECOM Harborcenter • Buffalo, NY (semifinal Game)	Raygan Kirk	W 5-2	20–11–4
March 7	vs. Mercyhurst*		LECOM Harborcenter • Buffalo, NY (championship game)	Raygan Kirk	L 1-2 ^{OT}	20–12–4
*Non-conference game. ^{#}Rankings from USCHO.com Poll.

== Awards and honors ==
RMU had three players honored with CHA All-Conference First Team laurels, Senior forward Jaycee Gephard earned her spot with her 28 assists enough to be second highest in the nation. Junior Emily Curlett was a first-team defender, as the nation's leader in power play goals. Lexi Templeman (forward, Second Team), Maggie Burbidge (forward, All-Rookie Team) and Raygan Kirk (goaltender, All-Rookie Team) rounded out CHA regular season awards for Robert Morris.

Defender Jordan Mortlock was named to the 2020 All-Tournament team.
