= 2019–20 RIT Tigers women's ice hockey season =

- Conference: 5th CHA
- Home ice: Gene Polisseni Center, Rochester, NY

Record
- Overall: 12–19–4
- Conference: 5–13–2
- Home: 11–8–3
- Road: 1–10–1
- Neutral: 0–1–0

Coaches and captains
- Head coach: Chad Davis (2nd season)
- Assistant coaches: Hannah McGowan
- Captain: Logan Land
- Alternate captain(s): Terra Lanteigne; Ellie Larson

The RIT Tigers Women's' Hockey Team represented the Rochester Institute of Technology in College Hockey America during the 2019-20 NCAA Division I women's ice hockey season. While Chad Davis still shaped his team in his second year, he was able to gain stability with a large influx of underclassmen.

== Offseason ==
- April 3: RIT Athletic Hall of Famer and Hockey Humanitarian Award laureate Kristine (Pierce) Brassie ('99) died. Brassie was named in SPORTMagazine's Heroes Edition (November, 1998) along with football great John Elway, basketball legend Michael Jordan, and Wayne Gretzky of the NHL. She was the first RIT athlete to have her jersey (No. 12) retired.

=== Recruiting ===
Player	Position	Nationality	Notes
Maddie Dunham	Defense	United States	Played for the Chicago Mission
Rachel Goff	Forward	United States	Maggie Dunham's teammate on the Chicago Mission
Kylie Lalonde	Forward	Canada	Played for the Ottawa Lady Senators
Justine Larkin	Defense	Canada	Teammate of Lalonde's on Ottawa Lady Senators
Taylor Liotta	Goaltender	Canada	Minded the net for Oakville Jr. Hornets
Jaymee Nolan	Forward	Canada	Winger for the London Jr. Devilettes
Hana Solinger	Forward	Canada	Former member of the Cambridge Jr. Rivulettes
Christa Stefanopoulos	Forward	United States	Quebec native attended Dawson College

== Standings ==
2019–20 College Hockey America standings
	Conference							Overall					
	GP	W	L	T	PTS	GF	GA	GP	W	L	T	GF	GA
#10 Mercyhurst†*	20	13	4	3	29	68	40	34	19	10	5	107	73
Robert Morris	20	13	5	2	28	67	40	34	19	11	4	111	82
Syracuse	20	11	7	2	24	69	40	34	13	19	2	99	89
Penn State	20	7	8	5	19	38	42	36	13	15	8	70	80
RIT	20	5	13	2	12	39	72	34	12	18	4	76	103
Lindenwood	20	3	15	2	8	26	73	33	5	23	5	42	117
Championship: March 7, 2020 † indicates conference regular season champion; * indicates conference tournament champion Rankings: USCHO.com

== 2018–19 Tigers ==
No.	Nat.	Player	Class	Pos	Height	DoB	Hometown	Previous team
5		Madison Itagaki	Sophomore	D	5' 3" (1.6 m)		Glenview, Illinois	Chicago Mission
6		Stella Haberman	Junior	F	5' 3" (1.6 m)		Golden Valley, Minnesota	Minnesota Whitecaps
8		Madison Farrand	Senior	F	5' 4" (1.63 m)		Potomac, Maryland	Washington Pride
9		Maddie Dunham	Freshman	D	5' 3" (1.6 m)		Glenview, Illinois	Brampton Canadettes
10		Hunter Barnett	Sophomore	F	5' 6" (1.68 m)		Caledon, Ontario	Mississauga Jr. Chiefs
13		Taylor Sims	Sophomore	D	5' 5" (1.65 m)		Deep River, Ontario	Ottawa Lady Senators
14		Ellie Larson (A)	Junior	D	5' 9" (1.75 m)		Hutchinson, Minnesota	Hutchinson HS
15		Rachel Goff	Freshman	F	5' 0" (1.52 m)		Naperville, Illinois	Chicago Mission
17		Taylor Baker	Senior	F	5' 4" (1.63 m)		Toronto, Ontario	Toronto Jr. Aeros
18		Abby Davies	Sophomore	F	5' 5" (1.65 m)		Ashton, Ontario	Ottawa Lady Senators
19		Hana Solinger	Freshman	F	5' 3" (1.6 m)		Chatsworth, Ontario	Cambridge Jr. Rivulettes
20		Christa Stefanopoulos	Freshman	F	5' 8" (1.73 m)		Pierrefonds, Quebec	Dawson College
21		Logan Land (C)	Graduate	F	5' 7" (1.7 m)		Turkey Point, Ontario	Burlington Barracudas
22		Jordan Marchese	Junior	F/D	5' 5" (1.65 m)		Mississauga, Ontario	Brampton Canadettes
23		Kylie LaLonde	Freshman	F	5' 8" (1.73 m)		Arnprior, Ontario	Ottawa Lady Senators
24		Jaymee Nolan	Freshman	F	5' 7" (1.7 m)		Dublin, Ontario	London Jr. Devilettes
26		Baylee Trani	Junior	F	5' 2" (1.57 m)		Huntington Beach, California	New England Hockey Club
27		Justine Larkin	Freshman	D	5' 7" (1.7 m)		Ottawa, Ontario	Ottawa Lady Senators
28		Jade Mancini	Senior	F	5' 8" (1.73 m)		Burlington, Ontario	Burlington Jr. Barracudas
30		Jessi O'Leary	Junior	G	5' 4" (1.63 m)		Woodstock, New Brunswick	Team New Brunswick
32		Taylor Liotta	Freshman	G	5' 8" (1.73 m)		Mississauga, Ontario	Oakville Jr. Hornets
35		Terra Lanteigne (A)	Senior	G	5' 8" (1.73 m)		Hatchet Lake, Nova Scotia	Metro Boston Pizza

== 2019–20 Schedule ==
Date	Opponent^{#}	Rank^{#}	Site	Decision	Result	Record
Regular Season
October 4	Vermont*		Gene Polisseni Center • Rochester, NY	Terra Lanteigne	L 1-3	0–1–0
October 5	Vermont*		Gene Polisseni Center • Rochester, NY	Terra Lanteigne	T 4-4 ^{OT}	0–1–1
October 11	St. Cloud State*		Gene Polisseni Center • Rochester, NY	Terra Lanteigne	L 1-4	0–2–1
October 12	St. Cloud State*		Gene Polisseni Center • Rochester, NY	Terra Lanteigne	L 0-3	0–3–1
October 18	at Mercyhurst		Mercyhurst Ice Center • Erie, PA	Terra Lanteigne	L 2-4	0–4–1 (0–1–0)
October 19	at Mercyhurst		Mercyhurst Ice Center • Erie, PA	Terra Lanteigne	L 0-6	0–5–1 (0–2–0)
October 25	Brown*		Gene Polisseni Center • Rochester, NY	Jessi O'Leary	W 6-0	1–5–1
October 26	Brown*		Gene Polisseni Center • Rochester, NY	Jessi O'Leary	W 4-2	2–5–1
November 1	at Syracuse		Tennity Ice Skating Pavilion • Syracuse, NY	Jessi O'Leary	W 7-4	3–5–1 (1–2–0)
November 2	Syracuse		Gene Polisseni Center • Rochester, NY	Jessi O'Leary	L 0-3	3–6–1 (1–3–0)
November 15	Dartmouth*		Gene Polisseni Center • Rochester, NY	Terra Lanteigne	W 4-3	4–6–1
November 16	Dartmouth*		Gene Polisseni Center • Rochester, NY	Jessi O'Leary	L 1-2 ^{OT}	4–7–1
November 19	at Union*		Achilles Center • Schenectady, NY	Terra Lanteigne	T 2-2 ^{OT}	4–7–2
November 26	at Colgate*		Class of 1965 Arena • Hamilton, NY	Jessi O'Leary	L 0-2	4–8–2
December 6	at Penn State		Pegula Ice Arena • University Park, PA	Jessi O'Leary	L 0-3	4–9–2 (1–4–0)
December 7	at Penn State		Pegula Ice Arena • University Park, PA	Terra Lanteigne	L 2-6	4–10–2 (1–5–0)
December 14	LIU*		Gene Polisseni Center • Rochester, NY	Terra Lanteigne	W 3-2 ^{OT}	5–10–2
December 15	LIU*		Gene Polisseni Center • Rochester, NY	Terra Lanteigne	W 5-2	6–10–2
January 3, 2018	Sacred Heart*		Gene Polisseni Center • Rochester, NY	Terra Lanteigne	W 3-2 ^{OT}	7–10–2
January 4	Sacred Heart*		Gene Polisseni Center • Rochester, NY	Terra Lanteigne	W 3-0	8–10–2
January 10	Robert Morris		Gene Polisseni Center • Rochester, NY	Terra Lanteigne	W 2-1	9–10–2 (2–5–0)
January 11	Robert Morris		Gene Polisseni Center • Rochester, NY	Terra Lanteigne	L 4-6	9–11–2 (2–6–0)
January 17	Lindenwood		Centene Community Ice Center • Maryland Heights, MO	Terra Lanteigne	L 0-3	9–12–2 (2–7–0)
January 18	Lindenwood		Centene Community Ice Center • Maryland Heights, MO	Terra Lanteigne	L 0-2	9–13–2 (2–8–0)
January 24	Mercyhurst		Gene Polisseni Center • Rochester, NY	Jessi O'Leary	L 2-5	9–14–2 (2–9–0)
January 25	Mercyhurst		Gene Polisseni Center • Rochester, NY	Taylor Liotta	L 1-5	9–15–2 (2–10–0)
February 7	at Syracuse		Tennity Ice Skating Pavilion • Syracuse, NY	Terra Lanteigne	L 1-3	9–16–2 (2–11–0)
February 8	Syracuse		Gene Polisseni Center • Rochester, NY	Terra Lanteigne	T 2-2 ^{OT}	9–16–3 (2–11–1)
February 14	Penn State		Gene Polisseni Center • Rochester, NY	Terra Lanteigne	W 4-2	10–16–3 (3–11–1)
February 15	Penn State		Gene Polisseni Center • Rochester, NY	Terra Lanteigne	W 4-3	11–16–3 (4–11–1)
February 21	at Robert Morris		Colonials Arena • Neville Township, PA	Terra Lanteigne	L 1-5	11–17–3 (4–12–1)
February 22	at Robert Morris		Colonials Arena • Neville Township, PA	Terra Lanteigne	L 2-5	11–18–3 (4–13–1)
February 28	Lindenwood		Gene Polisseni Center • Rochester, NY	Terra Lanteigne	W 2-5	12–18–3 (5–13–1)
February 29	Lindenwood		Gene Polisseni Center • Rochester, NY	Terra Lanteigne	T 1-1 ^{OT}	12–18–4 (5–13–2)
CHA Tournament
March 5	vs. Penn State*		LECOM Harborcenter • Buffalo, NY (Quarterfinal Game)	Terra Lanteigne	L 1-4	12–19–4
*Non-conference game. ^{#}Rankings from USCHO.com Poll.

== Awards and honors ==
Senior goaltender Terra Lanteigne was named the CHA All-Conference Second Team on the strength of a 2.97 Goals Against Average. Lanteigne leaves RIT with 2,392 saves, the most in the program's history. She had been the 2019-19 CHA Player of the Year.

Freshman Forward Jaymee Nolan was named to the CHA All-Rookie Team, with six goals on the season.
