= 2019–20 Wisconsin Badgers women's ice hockey season =

- Conference: WCHA
- Home ice: LaBahn Arena

Record
- Overall: 28-5-3
- Home: 12-1-1
- Road: 11-3-2
- Neutral: 5-1-0

Coaches and captains
- Head coach: Mark Johnson
- Assistant coaches: Dan Koch; Jackie Crum; Mark Greenhalgh
- Captain: Mekenzie Steffen
- Alternate captain: Alexis Mauermann

The Wisconsin Badgers represent the University of Wisconsin in WCHA women's ice hockey during the 2019-20 NCAA Division I women's ice hockey season. Daryl Watts would set a program record for most assists in one season with 49, while leading the NCAA with 74 points. Qualifying for the 2020 NCAA tournament, the Badgers were scheduled to face off against the Clarkson Golden Knights women's ice hockey program in the quarterfinals, but the tournament was cancelled due to the COVID-19 pandemic.

== Offseason ==
- September 3: Mercyhurst Lakers goaltender Kennedy Blair has transferred to the Badgers.

=== Recruiting ===
Player	Position	Nationality	Notes
Teagan Grant	Defense	Canada	Skated for the PWHL's Toronto Aeros. Won a gold medal with Canada's entry at the 2019 IIHF Under-18 Women's World Championships
Dara Greig	Forward	Canada	Captured the Canadian Sport School Hockey League Championship in her junior year with Pursuit of Excellence. Daughter of former NHL competitor Mark Greig

== Regular season ==
=== Standings ===
2019–20 Western Collegiate Hockey Association standings
	Conference								Overall					
	GP	W	L	T	SW	PTS	GF	GA	GP	W	L	T	GF	GA
#2 Wisconsin	26	17	4	3	2	56	97	48	34	27	4	3	156	60
#3 Minnesota	24	17	5	2	0	53	86	40	35	27	5	3	137	57
#5 Ohio State	26	13	6	5	2	46	81	56	36	22	8	6	116	79
#9 Minnesota Duluth	27	11	8	5	3	41	69	60	35	18	11	6	98	77
Bemidji State	24	9	13	2	0	29	46	68	37	16	18	3	71	91
Minnesota State	27	4	16	4	3	19	40	83	37	11	20	6	71	108
St. Cloud State	24	2	21	1	0	7	32	98	35	6	25	4	62	122
Championship: March 8, 2020 † indicates conference regular season champion; * indicates conference tournament champion Rankings: USCHO.com

== Home attendance ==
Wisconsin led all NCAA Division I women's ice hockey programs in both average and total home attendance, averaging 3,136 spectators and totaling 43,910 spectators. This marked the fourth consecutive season in which Wisconsin led in these attendance metrics.

The 14,361 spectators at the February 16 home game against St. Cloud State at the Kohl Center was (at the time) the second-highest attendance in the history of NCAA Division I women's ice hockey, behind only the 15,359 spectators that had attended Wisconsin's January 14, 2017 home game against St. Cloud State at the same venue.

== Roster ==
=== 2019–20 Badgers ===
No.	Nat.	Player	Class	Pos	Height	DoB	Hometown	Previous team
2		Natalie Buchbinder	Junior	D	5' 8" (1.73 m)		Fairport, New York	Shattuck-St. Mary's
4		Teagan Grant	Freshman	D	5' 6" (1.68 m)		New Liskeard, Ontario	Toronto Aeros
6		Presley Norby	Senior	F	5' 8" (1.73 m)		Minnetonka, Minnesota	Minnetonka High School
7		Dara Greig	Freshman	F	5' 7" (1.7 m)		Lethbridge, Alberta	Pursuit of Excellence
8		Maddie Rowe	Senior	F	5' 11" (1.8 m)		River Falls, Wisconsin	St. Croix Valley Fusion
9		Sophie Shirley	Sophomore	F	5' 9" (1.75 m)		Saskatoon, Saskatchewan	Calgary Inferno (CWHL)
18		Abby Roque	Senior	D	5' 7" (1.7 m)		Sault Ste. Marie, Michigan	Team USA U18
19		Daryl Watts	Junior	F	5' 6" (1.68 m)		Toronto, Ontario	Boston College (WHEA)
35		Kristen Campbell	Senior	G	5' 9" (1.75 m)		Brandon, Manitoba	U North Dakota

== Awards and honors ==
- Abby Roque, 2019-20 Preseason WCHA Co-Player of the Year
- Abby Roque: 2020 All-WCHA First Team
- Abby Roque: 2020 First Team All-American
- Abby Roque: 2020 WCHA Player of the Year
- Abby Roque: 2020 USCHO D-1 Women's Player of the Year
- Abby Roque: Bob Allen Women's Hockey Player of the Year (Awarded by USA Hockey)
- Sophie Shirley, 2020 All-WCHA Second Team
- Mekenzie Steffen, 2020 All-WCHA Second Team
- Daryl Watts: 2020 All-WCHA First Team

=== Team awards ===
- Badger Award (presented to the player who inspires others through her commitment to hard work and unselfish play): Alexis Mauermann
- Jeff Sauer Award (given to the player who consistently demonstrates dedication to her teammates, coaches and the sport of hockey): Kristen Campbell. NOTE: It marked the third straight season that Campbell won the award.
- Defensive Player of the Year honors: Mekenzie Steffen
- Offensive Player of the Year honors: (tie) Abby Roque and Daryl Watts.
- Freshman of the Year: Chayla Edwards
- Big Ten Sportsmanship Award: Caitlin Schneider
- W Club Community Service Award: Britta Curl
