= 2020 NCAA National Collegiate women's ice hockey tournament =

Cancelled NCAA women's ice hockey postseason tournament

- Teams: 8
- Finals site: Agganis Arena, Boston, Massachusetts

The 2020 NCAA National Collegiate Women's Ice Hockey Tournament was a planned single-elimination tournament by eight schools to determine the national champion of women's NCAA Division I college ice hockey. The quarterfinals were scheduled to be played at the campuses of the seeded teams on March 14, 2020, with the Frozen Four to be played on March 20 and 22, 2020 at Agganis Arena in Boston, Massachusetts. Boston University was scheduled to host the tournament, the second time that it would have hosted the Frozen Four. On March 12, the NCAA announced that the tournament was cancelled due to the COVID-19 pandemic.

== Qualifying teams ==
2020 Qualifying Teams
WCHA, ECAC, Hockey East, CHA

In the sixth year under this qualification format, the winners of all four Division I conference tournaments received automatic berths to the NCAA tournament. The other four teams were selected at-large. The top four teams were then seeded and received home ice for the quarterfinals.

Seed	School	Conference	Record	Berth type	Appearance	Last bid
1	Cornell	ECAC	28–2–3	At-large bid	8th	2019
2	Wisconsin	WCHA	28–5–3	At-large bid	14th	2019
3	Northeastern	Hockey East	32–4–2	Tournament champion	4th	2019
4	Minnesota	WCHA	27–6–3	At-large bid	18th	2019
	Clarkson	ECAC	25–6–6	At-large bid	9th	2019
	Mercyhurst	CHA	21–10–5	Tournament champion	13th	2018
	Ohio State	WCHA	24–8–6	Tournament champion	2nd	2018
	Princeton	ECAC	26–6–1	Tournament champion	4th	2019

== Bracket ==
National Quarterfinals; March 14
1	Cornell
Mercyhurst
4	Minnesota
Ohio State
3	Northeastern
Princeton
2	Wisconsin
Clarkson

National Semifinals; March 20

National Championship; March 22

Note: * denotes overtime period(s)

== Results ==
=== National Quarterfinals ===
==== (1) Cornell vs. Mercyhurst ====
March 14	Mercyhurst	2 p.m.	Cornell	Lynah Rink

==== (2) Wisconsin vs. Clarkson ====
March 14	Clarkson	3:07 p.m.	Wisconsin	LaBahn Arena

==== (3) Northeastern vs. Princeton ====
March 14	Princeton	1:05 p.m.	Northeastern	Matthews Arena

==== (4) Minnesota vs. Ohio State ====
March 14	Ohio State	5:00 p.m.	Minnesota	Ridder Arena
