= 2019–20 Princeton Tigers women's ice hockey season =

ECAC Tournament Champions
- Conference: ECAC

Record
- Overall: 26-6-1
- Conference: 17-4-1
- Home: 15-3-0
- Road: 9-2-1
- Neutral: 2-1-0

Coaches and captains
- Head coach: Cara Morey
- Assistant coaches: Melanie Ruzzi; Courtney Birchard; Daniel Gould

The Princeton Tigers represent Princeton University in ECAC women's ice hockey during the 2019–20 NCAA Division I women's ice hockey season. Resulting in a program-record 26 wins, the Tigers also experienced a pair of historic firsts, winning its first ECAC tournament title, and an NCAA tournament berth for the second consecutive year. On April 4, 2020, the Tigers had announced captains for the 2020-21 season, since cancelled. Sarah Filler earned the honor of the captaincy, while Sharon Frankel and Shannon Griffin were appointed alternate captains.

== Offseason ==
=== Recruiting ===
Player	Position	Nationality	Notes
Kate Monihan	Defense	United States	Played for USA U-18 National Team
Stef Wallace	Defense	Canada	Played for Canadian U-18 National Team

=== Schedule ===
Date	Opponent^{#}	Rank^{#}	Site	Decision	Result	Record
Regular Season
October 25	Syracuse Orange		Hobey Baker Rink • Princeton, NJ	Rachel McQuigge	W 3-1	1-0-0 (0-0-0)
October 26	Syracuse Orange		Hobey Baker Rink • Princeton, NJ	Stephanie Neatby	W 3-0	2-0-0 (0-0-0)
October 29	Quinnipiac Bobcats		Hobey Baker Rink • Princeton, NJ	Stephanie Neatby	W 4-2	3-0-0 (1-0-0)
November 1	at Colgate Raiders		Class of 1965 Arena • Hamilton, NY	Rachel McQuigge	W 1-0	4-0-0 (2-0-0)
November 2	at #3 Cornell Big Red		Lynah Rink • Ithaca, NY	Lindsay Browning (CU)	L 1-3	4-1-0 (2-1-0)
November 8	Harvard Crimson		Hobey Baker Rink • Princeton, NJ	Lindsay Reed (HARV)	L 2-6	4-2-0 (2-2-0)
November 9	Dartmouth Big Green		Hobey Baker Rink • Princeton, New Jersey	Rachel McQuigge	W 2-1	5-2-0 (3-2-0)
November 15	at Union Dutchwomen		Schenectady, New York	Cassie Reale	W 7-2	6-2-0 (4-2-0)
November 16	at RPI Engineers		Troy, NY	Stephanie Neatby	W 4-1	7-2-0 (5-2-0)
November 22	#5 Clarkson Golden Knights		Hobey Baker Rink • Princeton, NJ	Rachel McQuigge	W 2-1	8-2-0 (6-2-0)
November 23	St. Lawrence Saints		Hobey Baker Rink • Princeton, NJ	Stephanie Neatby	W 6-2	9-2-0 (7-2-0)
December 6	#4 Cornell Big Red		Hobey Baker Rink • Princeton, NJ	Lindsay Browning (CU)	L 1-5	9-3-0 (7-3-0)
ECAC Tournament
February 29	#10 Quinnipiac Bobcats		Hobey Baker Rink • Princeton, NJ	Abbie Ives (QU)	L 2-3 ^{OT}	23-6-1 (14-4-1)
March 1	#10 Quinnipiac Bobcats		Hobey Baker Rink • Princeton, NJ	Rachel McQuigge	W 3-2 ^{2 OT}	24-6-1 (15-4-1)
March 7	#7 Clarkson Golden Knights		Hobey Baker Rink • Princeton, NJ	Stephanie Neatby	W 5-1	25-6-1 (16-4-1)
March 8	at #1 Cornell Big Red		Lynah Rink • Ithaca, NY	Stephanie Neatby	W 3-2 ^{OT}	26-6-1 (17-4-1)
*Non-conference game. ^{#}Rankings from USCHO.com Poll.

== Roster ==
=== 2019-20 Tigers ===
No.	Nat.	Player	Class	Pos	Height	DoB	Hometown	Previous team
2		Mariah Keopple		D	5' 9" (1.75 m)		Menomonie, Wis.	Minnesota Jr. Whitecaps
3		Kate Monihan		D	5' 5" (1.65 m)		Moorestown, N.J.	USA U18
4		Claire Thompson		D	5' 8" (1.73 m)		Toronto, Ont.	Toronto Jr. Aeros
7		Stef Wallace		D	5' 10" (1.78 m)		Vancouver, B.C.	Canadian U18
8		Chloe Harvey		D	5' 5" (1.65 m)		Fairport, N.Y.	Selects Academy
9		Annie Kuehl		F	5' 7" (1.7 m)		Edina, Minn.	Edina HS
11		Shannon Griffin		F	5' 4" (1.63 m)		Arlington, Mass.	East Coast Wizards
12		Annie MacDonald		F	5' 4" (1.63 m)		Fall River, N.S.	Oakville Jr. Hornets
13		Sylvie Wallin		D	5' 10" (1.78 m)		Edina, Minn.	The Blake School
15		Catherine Kerin		F	5' 5" (1.65 m)		Edina, Minn.	St. Paul United
16		Sarah Fillier		F	5' 5" (1.65 m)		Georgetown, Ont.	Canadian U22
17		Daniella Calabrese		F	5' 6" (1.68 m)		Brooklin, Ont.	Canadian U18
18		Sharon Frankel		F	5' 1" (1.55 m)		West Hartford, Conn.	Mid Fairfield CT Stars
19		Amanda Harris		F	5' 11" (1.8 m)		Troy, Mich.	Ontario Hockey Academy
20		Carly Bullock		F	5' 7" (1.7 m)		Eden Prairie, Minn.	The Blake School
21		Emma Kee		F	5' 2" (1.57 m)		Cincinnati, Ohio	Shattuck St. Mary's
22		Maggie Connors		F	5' 6" (1.68 m)		St. John's, N.L.	Canadian U22
24		Kayla Fillier		F	5' 6" (1.68 m)		Georgetown, Ont.	Oakville Jr. Hornets
26		MacKenzie Ebel		F	5' 7" (1.7 m)		Airdrie, Alb.	Southern CT Stars
27		Solveig Neunzert		D	5' 9" (1.75 m)		Stockholm, Sweden	Sweden National Team
30		Cassie Reale		G	5' 9" (1.75 m)		Toronto, Ont.	Mississauga Jr. Chiefs
33		Rachel McQuigge	Junior	F	5' 7" (1.7 m)		Bowmanville, Ontario	Whitby Jr. Wolves (PWHL)
35		Stephanie Neatby	Senior	F	6' 0" (1.83 m)		Toronto, Ontario	Toronto Jr. Aeros (PWHL)

== Awards and honors ==
- Carly Bullock, Women's Hockey Commissioners Association Player of the Month February 2020

=== All-USCHO ===
- Carly Bullock, All-USCHO National Honors
- Sarah Fillier, All-USCHO National Honors

=== Team awards ===
- Elizabeth English Trophy: Carly Bullock
- Princeton Patty Kazmaier Award: Claire Thompson
- Rookie of the Year: Kate Monihan
- Unsung Hero Award: MacKenzie Ebel

=== AHCA All-America Scholar ===
The following Tigers were recognized by the American Hockey Coaches Association as All-America Scholars

- MacKenzie Ebel
- Sharon Frankel
- Claire Thompson, Senior
- Sylvie Wallin

=== All-Ivy honorees ===
- First Team All-Ivy
  - Sarah Fillier, Princeton
  - Carly Bullock, Princeton
- Second Team All-Ivy
  - Maggie Connors, Princeton
  - Claire Thompson, Princeton
