= Lindenwood Lady Lions ice hockey =

- Current season
- University: Lindenwood University
- Conference: AHA
- Head coach: Max Gavin; 1st season, 0–0–0
- Assistant coaches: Trey Flesch
- Arena: Centene Community Ice Center; St. Charles, Missouri
- Colors: Black and gold

ACHA tournament champions
- 2006, 2008, 2009, 2010

ACHA tournament appearances
- 2004, 2005, 2006, 2007, 2008, 2009, 2010, 2011

Conference tournament champions
- CCWHA: 2008, 2009, 2010, 2011

Conference regular season champions
- CCWHA: 2008, 2009, 2010, 2011

The Lindenwood Lady Lions ice hockey team represents Lindenwood University located in St. Charles, Missouri. The Lady Lions participate in NCAA Division I competition as a member of the Atlantic Hockey America (AHA) conference. The team played with no conference affiliation as an Independent program for its first season of NCAA competition. Lindenwood joined College Hockey America (CHA), a women-only conference, beginning in the 2012–13 season. After the 2023–24 season, CHA and the men-only Atlantic Hockey Association merged to create Atlantic Hockey America. Prior to 2011, the university was a member of the National Association of Intercollegiate Athletics (NAIA), because the organization does not sponsor women's ice hockey, the program competed in the American Collegiate Hockey Association at the ACHA Division I level.

The university completed the process of transitioning to the National Collegiate Athletic Association Division II for most athletics except for men's volleyball and women's ice hockey, which compete at the NCAA Division I level. As part of the Lindenwood University athletic program's transition to the NCAA, the team was not eligible for NCAA post season play until becoming a full member in 2014.

== History ==
=== Early history ===
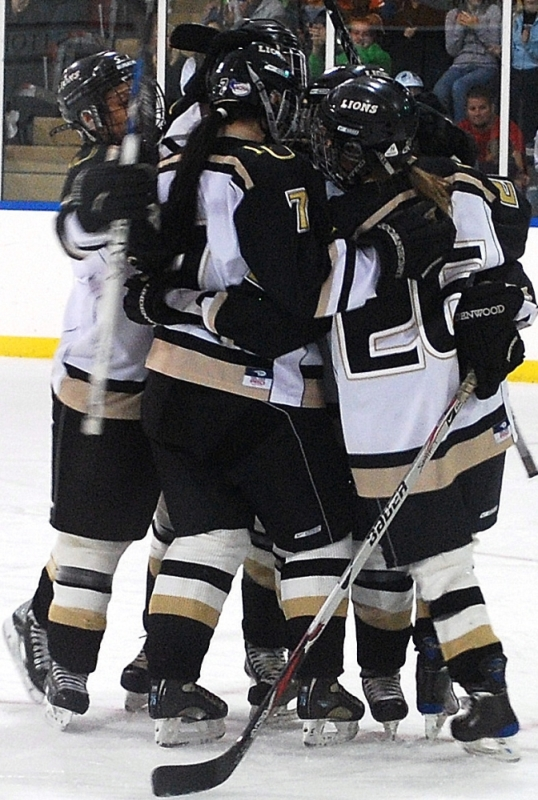
Lady Lions celebrate a goal against Robert Morris Univ.-Chicago. (2010)

Ice hockey at Lindenwood began in 2003, when men's and women's ice hockey were added as part of the ongoing university and athletic department expansion. The NAIA national ice hockey championship for men's hockey was discontinued in 1984, women's was never an NAIA sport Lindenwood fields teams in the American Collegiate Hockey Association (ACHA) along with a handful of other NAIA institutions and various club programs of NCAA institutions.

The Lady Lions began competition in the ACHA for the 2003–04 season, the team went 17–3–3 in 23 games that season. Freshman Kathrine Hannah led the team with 25 goals and 36 assists for 61 points. The team qualified for the ACHA Women's Division I National Championship tournament. LU lost 3–6 against the Wisconsin but recovered in the second pool play game beating Northern Michigan 3–2. The Lady Lions recovered with an overtime 5–4 win in the consolation round against West Los Angeles College and finished 5th in the nation.

The 2004–2005 the team improved on the previous season's statistics with a record of 24–3–0. In addition the Lady Lions qualified for the 2005 ACHA Women's Division National Tournament. The team finished the season ranked 2nd in the nation and 1st in the West Region. LU swept through the first rounds with a 2–1 win over the University of Massachusetts Amherst and 10- win over the University of Michigan before losing to the University of Colorado 3–4.

The Lady Lions finished the 2005–06 season 29–3–0, the team swept through the Championship Tournament, hosted for the first time at Lindenwood that season. LU picked up first round wins against Western Michigan University (8–1) and North Dakota State University (6–0). The team then faced off against the University of Colorado, in a rematch of the 2005 tournament. This time the Lady Lions came out on top winning 5–0 and picked up a 4–1 win in the semi-final round vs. Michigan State University. In front of a home crowd LU won their first ice hockey championship, 3–2 over Robert Morris University (Illinois).

Despite having the highest number of losses in the history of the program during the 2006–07 season, a record of 27–6–1. The team played strong during the regular season, even during a rebuilding year, highlights of the season included a tough 6–10 loss to NCAA Division I Sacred Heart. The team once again qualified for the ACHA Women's Division I National Championship and advanced to the Championship game again against Robert Morris University. This time the Lady Lions came up short to the Eagles with a 1–4 loss.

The 2007–08 season marked the end of LU as an independent team in the ACHA, the Lady Lions joined the Central Collegiate Women's Hockey Association (CCWHA). Lindenwood won the CCWHA Regular season title that season going 10–0 in conference games. The team finished the season with a record of 36–3–0, the best in the program history to date. During the 08–07 season they went 6–1 against NCAA Division III opponents. The only loss against NCAA teams 1–2 at St. Mary's University.

LU advanced through the CCWHA and won the CCWHA Playoff Championship in their first season in the conference with a 4–0 shutout of Michigan. The team advanced through the ACHA tournament to the championship game for the third straight season, and once again against Robert Morris. LU came out on top 2–1 over RMU and won the school's second ACHA Women's DI National Championship. Senior Kat Hannah won the Zoey M. Harris Award given to the ACHA national player of the year. she recorded a team-high 87 points with 37 goals and 50 assists and had a +/- rating of +72.

LU continued their winning tradition in the 2008–09 season, with a record of 32–3–3, 10–0–3 in the CCWHA and 2–2 vs NCAA Division III opponents. LU became the CCWHA regular season champions for the second straight season and won their second straight CCWHA playoff championship with an overtime win over Michigan State. The Lady Lions advance to the ACHA National Championship games with a 2-overtime win over University of Massachusetts and a 3-overtime win over University of Minnesota and won the team's third ACHA Women's DI National Championship and second straight against Robert Morris. Following the season head coach Vince O'Mara was named the 2009 ACHA Division I Women's Coach of the Year.

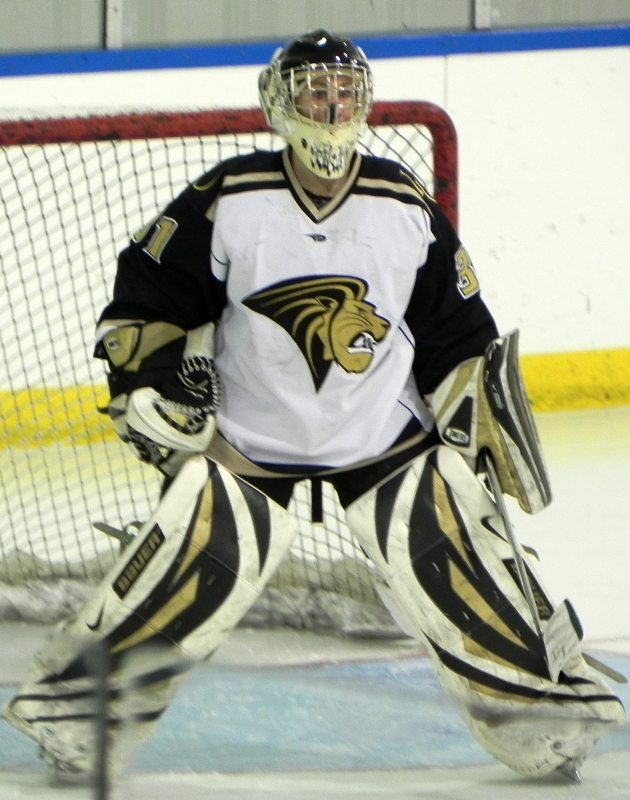
Rebecca Bernet, the 2010 Zoey M. Harris Award for ACHA national player of the year.

LU finished the 2009–10 season with the best record in program history, over previous record set the 2007–08 season. Lindenwood finished with an overall record of 43 wins, 2 losses, and 2 ties, including a loss and a tie against NCAA DIII teams. The Lady Lions went 12–0 in the CCWHA and stormed through the CCWHA playoffs, only allowing 2 goals in four playoff games. The team won the fourth ACHA Women's Division I National Championship and third straight with a 2–0 shutout win over Michigan State University. In addition to the third straight national championship for the Lady Lions, the men's program also won its second straight ACHA Men's Division I National Championship, marking the first time a school has repeated as back-to-back hockey champions in men's and women's at any collegiate level. The university showcased its hockey tradition also winning the 2010 NCRHA Division I Collegiate Roller Hockey National Championships.

=== Move to NCAA ===
Lindenwood announced in July 2010 it would become a member of the NCAA, women's ice hockey as one of the sports included in the list moving to the NCAA. Because the NCAA does not sponsor ice hockey at the Division II level, it was announced the team would compete as a member of Division I. The Lindenwood Lady Lions hockey team is the first and only NCAA women's hockey program in Missouri. The 2010–11 season would be the Lady Lions last as members of the CCWHA and the ACHA DI as part of the team's transition to the NCAA. The Lady Lions concluded the 2010–11 regular season with a 29–2–2 record and .909 winning percentage. The season included a 12-game win streak from November 6, 2010, until January 22, 2011, and a 3–4 loss to UMass Amherst, the team's only regulation loss during the regular season. Portion of the 12-game win streak include a 6-game shutout streak during which the Lady Lions outscored opponents 54–0. The Lady Lions set a program record on January 29, 2011, when the team put up 30 goals against Northern Michigan, surpassing a previous record of 16 goals against Penn State on March 8, 2007, and 17 goals against Western Michigan set earlier the same season on December 5, 2011. The Lady Lions concluded the 2010–11 regular season with a 29–2–2 record and overall record of 33–3–2. The team won a fourth consecutive CCWHA title in a 3–0 win over Grand Valley State, The Lady Lions advanced through pool play before falling 1–3 to rival Michigan State in the semifinal round, taking third place.

In the July 2011, Lindenwood announced the 2011–12 schedule, the first of NCAA competition in program history. The schedule included 22 games against NCAA Division I competition, including an inaugural NCAA two-game series against the defending NCAA National Champion Wisconsin Badgers; seven games against NCAA Division III; and five games against former ACHA Division I rivals Robert Morris (IL) and Grand Valley State In September 2011, it was announced that Lindenwood officially submitted an application to join College Hockey America (CHA) for the 2012–2013 season. Lindenwood was admitted into the conference on November 11, 2011, and will begin conference play starting in the 2012–13 season along with Penn State, bringing the CHA's membership to six members. The team finished the 2011–12 season with a record of 8–21–0, not including 3–0–0 record in exhibition play. Although the team was winless in their four regulation games at home, the team finished the season on a six-game win streak that included the program's first win against an NCAA Division I opponent and first shutout of an NCAA Division I opponent with a 4–0 win over Sacred Heart on January 20, 2012. Lindenwood earned its first series sweep in program history over an NCAA Division I opponent on January 21, 2012, with a 5–2 win against Sacred Heart. The Lady Lions ended the game scoring a season-high nine goals and outshooting Saint Michael's 53–12 in the 9–1 win. Lindenwood finished the season on a season high six game win streak and won eight NCAA games overall. In addition Lindenwood swept its exhibition series against rival Robert Morris Illinois. Lindenwood's exhibition series against Grand Valley State scheduled for February 17 and 18 was cancelled. The team finished the season tied for first in the NCAA in shorthanded goals but also recorded the second most penalties. Special teams proved difficult in the program's first season in the NCAA, the Lady Lions were ranked 20th in power play percentage, converting on 21 of 140 power play opportunities. The team finished last, 35th, in penalty killing percentage, having 10 of 163 attempts. Freshman forward, Alison Wickenheiser lead the team with 19 goals, 17 assists for 36 points in 29 games. Wickenheiser lead the team in all three categories: goals, assists and points and finished the 30th ranked offensive player in the NCAA. In goal, freshman Taylor Fairchild recorded a 5–18–0 record, playing 1,400 minutes in goal and stopping 984 shots.

== Season-by-season results ==
| Won championship | Lost championship | Conference champions | League leader |

| Year | Coach | W | L | T | Conference | Conf. W | Conf. L | Conf. T | Finish | Conference Tournament | NCAA Tournament |
| 2025–26 | Taylor Wasylk | 14 | 21 | 2 | AHA | 11 | 12 | 1 | 3rd AHA | Won Quarterfinals vs. Robert Morris (3–1); Lost Semifinals vs. Mercyhurst (1–2, 2–3 2OT) | Did not qualify |
| 2024–25 | Taylor Wasylk | 5 | 26 | 2 | AHA | 4 | 15 | 1 | 5th AHA | Lost Quarterfinals vs. RIT (0–4) | Did not qualify |
| 2023–24 | Taylor Wasylk | 11 | 19 | 2 | CHA | 6 | 12 | 2 | 5th CHA | Did not qualify | Did not qualify |
| 2022–23 | Shelley Looney | 5 | 27 | 0 | CHA | 5 | 11 | 0 | 4th CHA | Lost Quarterfinals vs. Penn State (1–4, 1–7) | Did not qualify |
| 2021–22 | Shelley Looney | 6 | 22 | 1 | CHA | 4 | 9 | 1 | 4th CHA | Lost First Round vs. RIT (4–6) | Did not qualify |
| 2020–21 | Shelley Looney | 2 | 14 | 1 | CHA | 2 | 13 | 1 | 5th CHA | Lost Quarterfinals vs. Syracuse (0–6) | Did not qualify |
| 2019–20 | Shelley Looney | 5 | 25 | 5 | CHA | 3 | 15 | 2 | 6th CHA | Lost Quarterfinals vs. Syracuse (0–4) | Did not qualify |
| 2018–19 | Scott Spencer | 7 | 22 | 4 | CHA | 3 | 14 | 3 | 6th CHA | Lost Quarterfinals vs. Syracuse (1–4) | Did not qualify |
| 2017–18 | Scott Spencer | 10 | 20 | 1 | CHA | 8 | 12 | 0 | 5th CHA | Lost Quarterfinals vs. Penn State (1–2) | Did not qualify |
| 2016–17 | Scott Spencer | 6 | 25 | 2 | CHA | 3 | 16 | 1 | 6th CHA | Won Quarterfinals vs. Mercyhurst (3–2); Lost Semifinals vs. Robert Morris (1–2) | Did not qualify |
| 2015–16 | Scott Spencer | 9 | 24 | 4 | CHA | 5 | 11 | 4 | 5th CHA | Lost Quarterfinals vs. Robert Morris (4–3, 1–3, 1–5) | Did not qualify |
| 2014–15 | Scott Spencer | 10 | 21 | 2 | CHA | 7 | 11 | 2 | 5th CHA | Lost Quarterfinals vs. Penn State (0–1, 1–3) | Did not qualify |
| 2013–14 | Vince O'Mara | 5 | 26 | 3 | CHA | 5 | 13 | 2 | 5th CHA | Lost Quarterfinals vs. Syracuse (1–4, 0–6) | Not eligible* |
| 2012–13 | Vince O'Mara | 7 | 26 | 3 | CHA | 7 | 10 | 3 | 5th CHA | Lost Quarterfinals vs. Robert Morris (1–2 3OT, 0–2) | Not eligible* |
| 2011–12 | Vince O'Mara | 8 | 21 | 0 | Independent | | | | | | Not eligible* |
| 2010–11 | Vince O'Mara | 33 | 3 | 2 | | | | | | | Third Place in ACHA Tournament |
| 2009–10 | Vince O'Mara | 43 | 2 | 2 | | | | | | | ACHA National Champion |
| 2008–09 | Vince O'Mara | 32 | 3 | 3 | | | | | | | ACHA National Champion |
| 2007–08 | Vince O'Mara | 36 | 3 | 0 | | | | | | | ACHA National Champion |
| 2006–07 | Vince O'Mara | 27 | 6 | 1 | | | | | | | ACHA National Runner-Up |
| 2005–06 | Vince O'Mara | 29 | 3 | 0 | | | | | | | ACHA National Champion |
| 2004–05 | Vince O'Mara | 24 | 3 | 0 | | | | | | | ACHA National Quarterfinal |
| 2003–04 | Vince O'Mara | 17 | 3 | 3 | | | | | | | Fifth Place in ACHA Tournament |

* Note: From 2012–2014 LU not eligible for NCAA post season due to transition process from NAIA to NCAA.

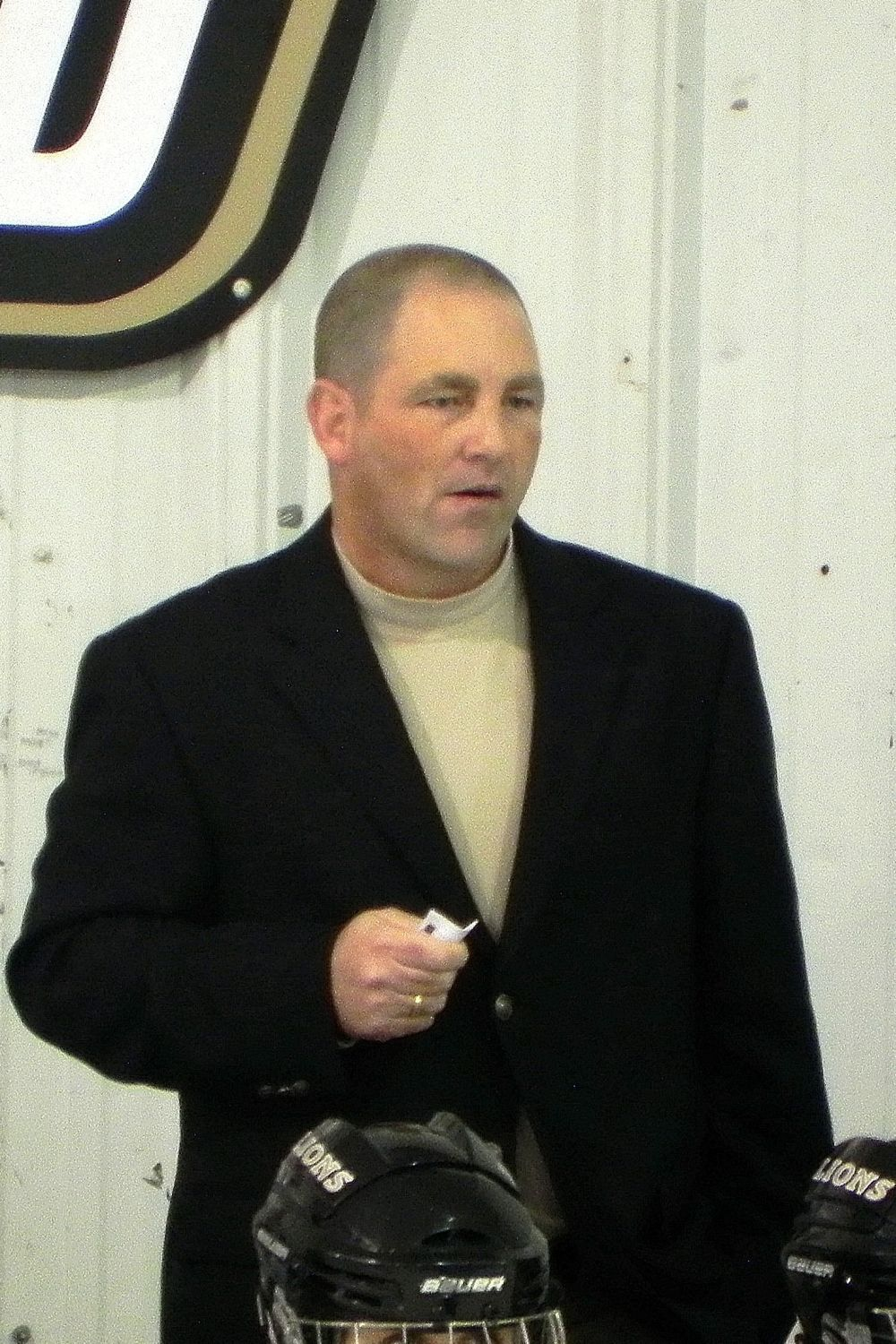
Vince O'Mara behind the bench of the Lindenwood women's ice hockey team.

== Coaches ==
From the program's inception to the end of the 2013–2014 season, Vince O'Mara was the head coach of the Lady Lions women's ice hockey program. Prior to joining the NCAA, O'Mara was a 2-time ACHA Coach of the Year (2005–06, 2009–10). He has compiled a record of 241–26–11 over 8 seasons behind the bench of the Lady Lions and is currently 0–1–0 against NCAA Division I opponents, 9–4–1 against NCAA Division III opponents, and 231–21–10 against ACHA opponents. In 2010 O'Mara was named assistant coach on the 2011 United States University Women's Select Team that competed at the 2011 Winter World University Games in Erzurum, Turkey.

Following the 2013–2014 season, O'Mara's contract was not renewed owing largely to their 20–73–6 record in Division 1. Scott Spencer was hired to replace O'Mara. Spencer spent 2012–2014 with the Pursuit of Excellence Hockey Academy in Kelowna, BC after spending 2006–2011 as an assistant coach for Robert Morris and 2005 as an assistant coach at Ohio State.

After the conclusion of the 2018–19 season, the program announced head coach Scott Spencer had been relieved of his duties and was beginning a search for a new head coach. Spencer compiled a 42–112–13 record in his five seasons at Lindenwood, including a 26–64–10 mark inside conference play. A few months later former Olympic gold medalist Shelley Looney was hired to replace Spencer.

Following the 2022–23 season, Lindenwood announced a coaching change. Taylor Wasylk was named head coach of the program a few months later in May 2023.

== Players ==
=== Awards and honors ===
- Amanda Blanc, 2010 ESPN the Magazine Academic All-American third-team for the women's at-large category.
- Becca Bernet, 2010 Zoey M. Harris Award for ACHA national player of the year.
- Kat Hannah, 2008 Zoey M. Harris Award for ACHA national player of the year.
- Kat Hannah, 2006 ACHA Women's DI Most Valuable Player Award.
- Nicole Hensley, 2016 Set NCAA all-time saves record finishing the season with 4094 saves in her career.

==== College Hockey America ====
- Nicole Hensley: Lindenwood, 2014–15 All-CHA First Team
- Shara Jasper: Lindenwood, 2014–15 All-CHA First Team

== International ==
- Nicole Hensley, United States, 2016 IIHF Women's World Championship, 2018 Winter Olympics, 2022 Winter Olympics
- Lucie Quarto, France, 2026 Winter Olympics
- Elina Zilliox, France,2026 Winter Olympics

== Championships ==
- 4-time Women's Division I ACHA National Champions (2006, 2008, 2009, 2010)
- 4-time CCWHA Regular Season Champions (2008, 2009, 2010, 2011)
- 4-time CCWHA Playoff Season Champions (2008, 2009, 2010, 2011)

== School records ==
The following are the Lindenwood school records. Statistics are accurate as of the 2009–10 season.

Note: Italics indicate a player is still an active Lady Lion.

=== Individual records ===
==== Career ====
- Most goals in a career: Kathrine Hannah, 153 (2003–2007)
- Most assists in a career: Kathrine Hannah, 254 (2003–2007)
- Most points in a career: Kathrine Hannah, 407 (2003–2007)
- Most power-play goals in a career: Mandy Dion 37, (2006–2009)
- Most short handed goals in a career: Mandy Dion 13, (2006–2009)
- Most penalty minutes in a career: Mandy Dion 107, (2006–2009)
- Most wins in a career: Becca Bernet 94, (2006–2010)
- Highest save percentage in a career: Jennifer Twillman, .948, (2003–2004)
- Best goals against average in a career: Lori Barton, 0.69 (2007–08)

==== Season ====
- Most goals in a season: Mandy Dion 61, (2009–2010)
- Most assists in a season: Kathrine Hannah, 67 (2004–2005)
- Most points in a season: Kathrine Hannah, 97 (2004–2005)
- Most power-play goals in a season: Mandy Dion, 18 (2009–2010)
- Most short handed goals in a season: Mandy Dion, 6 (2008–2009)
- Most penalty minutes in a season: Mandy Dion, 80 (2008–2009)
- Most wins in a season: Becca Bernet, 39 (2009–10)
- Highest save percentage in a season: Kayetoinette Stock, .958 (2009–10)
- Best goals against average in a season: Kayetoinette Stock, .33 (2009–10)

==== Game ====
- Most goals in a game: Amy Dlugos, 6 (10/23/03 vs. Illinois)
- Most assists in a game: Kathrine Hannah, 10 (11/19/04 vs. Notre Dame)
- Most points in a game: Kathrine Hannah, 10 (On two occasions)
- Most power-play goals in a game: Mandy Dion, 3 (3/12/10 vs. Michigan State)
- Most short-handed goals in a game: Mandy Dion, 3 (3/8/07 vs. Penn State)
- Most penalty minutes in a game:19, Mandy Dion, 19 (12/5/09 vs. Robert Morris)
- Most saves in a game: Taylor Fairchild, 67 (10/28/11 vs. Mercyhurst)

=== Team records ===
==== Season ====
- Most wins in a season: 43 (2009–10)
- Fewest wins in a season: 8 (2011–12)
- Most goals in a season: 276 (2007–2008)
- Fewest goals allowed in a season: 30 (2005–06)

==== Game ====
- Most goals in a game: 30 (1/29/11 vs. Northern Michigan)
- Most power-play goals in a game : 7 (11/18/08 vs. Western Michigan)
- Most short-handed goals in a game: 6 (3/8/07 vs. Penn State)
- Most saves in a game: 67 (10/28/11 vs. Mercyhurst)

== Lions in professional hockey ==
| = CWHL All-Star | = NWHL All-Star | = Clarkson Cup Champion | = Isobel Cup Champion |

| Player | Position | Team(s) | League(s) | Years | Clarkson Cup | Isobel Cup |
|---|---|---|---|---|---|---|
| Melanie Jue Asst. Coach | Forward | Kunlun Red Star | CWHL | | | |
| Nicole Hensley | Goaltender | Minnesota Frost | PWHL | | | |

== See also ==
- Lindenwood Lions
- Lindenwood Lions men's ice hockey
