= 2019–20 NCAA Division I women's ice hockey season =

Ice hockey season

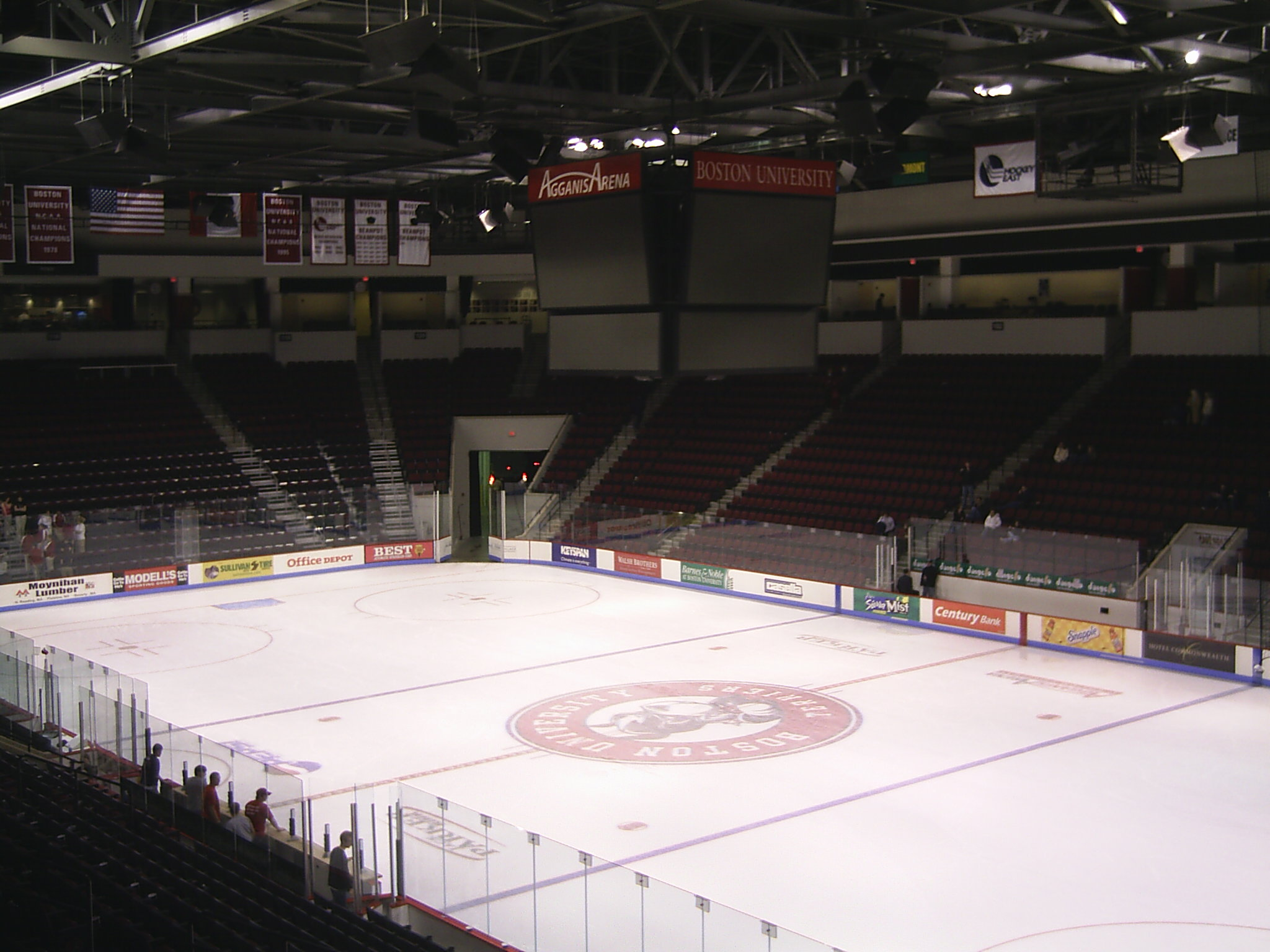
- Agganis Arena was set to host the 2020 tournament
- NCAA tournament: 2020
- National championship: Agganis Arena; Boston, Massachusetts
- Patty Kazmaier Award: Elizabeth Giguere, Clarkson ()

The 2019–20 NCAA Division I women's ice hockey season is the 19th season of competition in the National Collegiate division of NCAA women's ice hockey, the de facto equivalent of Division I in that sport. The season began in September 2019 and ended on March 10, 2020, following the conclusion of the ECAC Championship. The 2020 NCAA Division I women's ice hockey tournament at Agganis Arena in Boston which was supposed to be held March 20 and 22 was cancelled due to the COVID-19 pandemic.

== Changes from 2018–19 ==
The most significant change from the 2018–19 season was the recognition of the New England Women's Hockey Alliance (NEWHA) as an official NCAA conference. The NEWHA was founded in 2017 as a scheduling alliance by the six schools that then competed as National Collegiate independents—full Division I members Holy Cross and Sacred Heart, plus Division II members Franklin Pierce, Post, Saint Anselm, and Saint Michael's. Holy Cross left after the first NEWHA season of 2017–18 to join Hockey East. Shortly before the 2018–19 season, the remaining five members formally organized as a conference and began the process of gaining full NCAA recognition.

In the meantime, LIU Brooklyn had announced that it would add women's ice hockey effective in 2019–20, and would join the NEWHA at that time. Shortly after this announcement, the school's parent institution, Long Island University, announced that it would merge the athletic programs of its two main campuses (Division I Brooklyn and Division II Post) into a single Division I program that would later be unveiled as the LIU Sharks.

With the conference membership returning to six for 2019–20, the NCAA officially approved the NEWHA as a Division I conference shortly before the start of that season. This action also meant that there would be no independent programs in that season, since the NEWHA membership included all of the previous National Collegiate independents.

== Regular season ==
=== Standings ===
- 2019–20 College Hockey America standings
  	Conference							Overall					
  	GP	W	L	T	PTS	GF	GA	GP	W	L	T	GF	GA
  #10 Mercyhurst†*	20	13	4	3	29	68	40	34	19	10	5	107	73
  Robert Morris	20	13	5	2	28	67	40	34	19	11	4	111	82
  Syracuse	20	11	7	2	24	69	40	34	13	19	2	99	89
  Penn State	20	7	8	5	19	38	42	36	13	15	8	70	80
  RIT	20	5	13	2	12	39	72	34	12	18	4	76	103
  Lindenwood	20	3	15	2	8	26	73	33	5	23	5	42	117
  Championship: March 7, 2020 † indicates conference regular season champion; * indicates conference tournament champion Rankings: USCHO.com
- 2019–20 ECAC Hockey standings
  	Conference							Overall					
  	GP	W	L	T	PTS	GF	GA	GP	W	L	T	GF	GA
  #1 Cornell	22	19	0	3	41	84	16	31	27	1	3	121	28
  #6 Princeton	22	17	4	1	35	77	40	31	24	6	1	114	54
  #7 Clarkson	22	14	4	4	32	63	29	36	25	5	6	110	50
  Harvard	22	15	6	1	31	69	53	32	18	13	1	93	85
  Yale	22	13	9	0	26	53	49	32	17	15	0	86	81
  Colgate	22	11	8	3	25	71	43	38	17	15	6	110	84
  #10 Quinnipiac	22	11	9	2	24	63	43	37	20	14	3	104	70
  St. Lawrence	22	8	10	4	20	34	43	36	13	16	7	73	83
  Union	22	5	14	3	13	39	74	34	5	24	5	52	115
  Dartmouth	22	4	15	3	11	36	70	29	7	19	3	52	91
  Brown	22	2	18	2	6	24	85	29	3	23	3	33	119
  RPI	22	0	22	0	0	14	82	34	0	33	1	21	122
  Championship: March 10, 2020 † indicates conference regular season champion; * indicates conference tournament champion Rankings: USCHO.com
- 2019–20 NEWHA standings
  	Conference							Overall					
  	GP	W	L	T	PTS	GF	GA	GP	W	L	T	GF	GA
  Sacred Heart	21	19	2	0	38	77	31	31	20	11	0	89	77
  Franklin Pierce	20	13	7	0	26	75	40	29	18	11	0	107	63
  St. Anselm	20	11	8	1	23	52	35	30	14	13	3	71	63
  LIU	21	11	10	0	22	79	53	32	14	18	0	100	107
  Saint Michael's	20	4	15	1	9	24	66	26	5	18	3	32	82
  Post	20	2	18	0	4	23	105	29	7	22	0	52	136
  Championship: March 8, 2020 † indicates conference regular season champion; * indicates conference tournament champion Rankings: USCHO.com
- 2019–20 Western Collegiate Hockey Association standings
  	Conference								Overall					
  	GP	W	L	T	SW	PTS	GF	GA	GP	W	L	T	GF	GA
  #2 Wisconsin	26	17	4	3	2	56	97	48	34	27	4	3	156	60
  #3 Minnesota	24	17	5	2	0	53	86	40	35	27	5	3	137	57
  #5 Ohio State	26	13	6	5	2	46	81	56	36	22	8	6	116	79
  #9 Minnesota Duluth	27	11	8	5	3	41	69	60	35	18	11	6	98	77
  Bemidji State	24	9	13	2	0	29	46	68	37	16	18	3	71	91
  Minnesota State	27	4	16	4	3	19	40	83	37	11	20	6	71	108
  St. Cloud State	24	2	21	1	0	7	32	98	35	6	25	4	62	122
  Championship: March 8, 2020 † indicates conference regular season champion; * indicates conference tournament champion Rankings: USCHO.com
- 2019–20 WHEA standings
  	Conference							Overall					
  	GP	W	L	T	PTS	GF	GA	GP	W	L	T	GF	GA
  #4 Northeastern	27	24	3	0	48	106	20	36	30	4	2	137	35
  #8 Boston University	27	18	6	3	39	77	43	36	24	8	4	108	58
  Providence	27	15	10	2	32	58	53	36	18	14	4	85	71
  Boston College	27	14	11	2	30	76	69	36	17	16	3	94	97
  UConn	27	13	12	2	28	60	54	37	18	17	2	89	80
  New Hampshire	27	12	12	3	'27	58	53	36	18	14	4	83	70
  Maine	27	9	11	7	25	61	62	36	15	13	8	92	75
  Vermont	27	7	14	6	20	65	84	36	10	18	8	85	109
  Holy Cross	27	5	20	2	12	27	98	33	5	23	5	36	117
  Merrimack	27	2	20	5	9	39	91	34	5	24	5	57	111
  Championship: March 8, 2020 † indicates conference regular season champion; * indicates conference tournament champion Rankings: USCHO.com

== Player stats ==
=== Scoring leaders ===
The following players lead the NCAA in points at the conclusion of games played on November 11, 2019.

Player	Class	Team	GP	G	A	Pts
Daryl Watts	Junior	Wisconsin	12	10	19	29
Jaycee Gebhard	Senior	Robert Morris	12	7	19	26
Sophie Shirley	Sophomore	Wisconsin	12	10	14	24
Abby Roque	Senior	Wisconsin	12	9	13	22
Elizabeth Giguère	Junior	Clarkson	12	11	10	21
Grace Zumwinkle	Junior	Minnesota	12	11	9	20
Gabrielle Davis	Freshman	Clarkson	12	6	13	19
Taylor Heise	Sophomore	Minnesota	12	8	11	19
Alina Mueller	Sophomore	Northeastern	9	5	14	19

=== Leading goaltenders ===
The following goaltenders lead the NCAA in goals against average.
GP = Games played; Min = Minutes played; W = Wins; L = Losses; T = Ties; GA = Goals against; SO = Shutouts; SV% = Save percentage; GAA = Goals against average

Player	Class	Team	GP	Min	W	L	T	GA	SO	SV%	GAA
Tera Hofmann	Senior	Yale	4	232:48	4	0	0	1	3	.983	0.26
Lindsay Browning	Junior	Cornell	6	364:02	5	0	1	3	3	.976	0.49
Aerin Frankel	Junior	Northeastern	9	532:23	8	1	0	8	3	.959	0.90
Michaela Kane	Senior	Saint Anselm	4	243:09	3	1	0	4	1	.945	0.99
Samantha Carpentier-Yelle	Sophomore	Connecticut	5	297:28	4	1	0	6	2	.934	1.21

== Awards and honors ==
- Elizabeth Giguere, Clarkson, Patty Kazmaier Award
- Doug Derraugh, Cornell, AHCA Coach of the Year

=== All-America honors ===
- Aerin Frankel, Northeastern, First Team All-American
- Jaime Bourbonnais, Cornell, CCM Hockey Women's Division I All-American: First Team
- Lindsay Browning, Cornell, CCM Hockey Women's Division I All-American: Second Team

=== All-USCHO honors ===
- Sarah Fillier, Princeton, All-USCHO National Honors
- Carly Bullock, Princeton, All-USCHO National Honors

=== CHA Awards ===
- Emma Nuutinen, Senior, Forward, Mercyhurst, Player of the Year
- Mae Batherson, Forward, Syracuse, Rookie of the Year
- Mike Sisti, Mercyhurst, Coach of the Year
- Lindsay Eastwood, Senior, Syracuse, Best Defenseman
- Alexa Vasko, Junior, Mercyhurst, Best Defensive Forward
- Abby Moloughney, Sophomore, Forward, Syracuse, Individual Sportsmanship Award
- Syracuse, Team Sportsmanship Award
- Kennedy Blair, Goaltender, Mercyhurst, CHA Tournament MVP

All-Conference First Team

- Forward – Jaycee Gebhard, Senior, Robert Morris
- Forward – Emma Nuutinen, Senior, Mercyhurst
- Forward – Abby Moloughney, Sophomore, Robert Morris
- Forward – Michele Robillard, Senior, Mercyhurst
- Defense – Lindsay Eastwood, Senior, Syracuse
- Defense – Emily Curlett, Junior, Robert Morris
- Goalie – Chantal Burke, Junior, Penn State

All-Conference Second Team

- Forward – Maggie Knott, Senior, Mercyhurst
- Forward – Lexi Templeman, Junior, Robert Morris
- Forward – Savannah Rennie, Senior, Syracuse
- Defense – Izzy Heminger, Sophomore, Penn State
- Defense – Sam Isbell, Senior, Mercyhurst
- Goalie – Terra Lanteigne, Senior, RIT

All-Rookie Team

- Forward – Madison Beishuizen, Syracuse
- Forward – Jaymee Nolan, RIT
- Forward – Maggy Burbidge, Robert Morris
- Defense – Mae Batherson, Syracuse
- Defense – Mallory Uihlein, Penn State
- Goalie – Raygan Kirk, Robert Morris

=== ECAC Awards ===
- Elizabeth Giguere, ECAC Hockey Player of the Year
- Elizabeth Giguere, ECAC Hockey Best Forward
- Dave Flint, ECAC Hockey Coach of the Year

==== ECAC All-Stars ====
- First Team All-ECAC
  - Elizabeth Giguere, 2019–20 ECAC Hockey First Team All-League

=== Ivy League Awards ===
- Lindsay Browning, Cornell, Ivy League Player of the Year
- Izzy Daniel, Cornell, Ivy League Rookie of the Year

==== All-Ivy honorees ====
- First Team All-Ivy
  - Sarah Fillier, Princeton
  - Carly Bullock, Princeton
  - Kristin O'Neill, Cornell
  - Micah Zandee-Hart, Cornell
  - Jaime Bourbonnais, Cornell
  - Lindsay Browning, Cornell
- Second Team All-Ivy
  - Maggie Connors, F, Princeton
  - Maddie Mills, F, Cornell
  - Dominique Petrie, F, Harvard
  - Emma Seitz, D, Yale
  - Claire Thompson, D, Princeton
  - Rachel McQuigge, G, Princeton
- Honorable Mention All-Ivy
  - Claire Dalton, F, Yale
  - Kristin Della Rovere, F, Harvard
  - Lotti Odnoga, D, Dartmouth
  - Ali Peper, D, Harvard
  - Becky Dutton, G, Harvard

=== HCA Awards ===
- Aerin Frankel, Hockey Commissioners Association Women's Goaltender of the Month (November 2019)
- Katy Knoll, Women’s Hockey Commissioners’ Association National Rookie of the Month, November 2019
- Corinne Schroeder, Hockey Commissioners Association Women’s Goaltender of the Month (December 2019)
- Ida Kuoppala, Maine, Women's Hockey Commissioners Association Rookie of the Month (February 2020)
- Carly Bullock, Princeton, Women's Hockey Commissioners Association Player of the Month February 2020
- Ava Boutilier, New Hampshire, Women's Hockey Commissioners Association Goaltender of the Month February 2020
