= List of NCAA Division I ice hockey arenas =

This is a list of arenas that currently serve as the home venue for NCAA Division I college ice hockey teams. Conference affiliations reflect those in the most recent 2025–26 NCAA Division I men's ice hockey and 2025–26 NCAA Division I women's ice hockey seasons. The arenas serve as home venues for both the men's and women's teams except where noted. In addition, venues which are not located on campus or are used infrequently during the season have been listed.

== Current arenas ==
Off-campus arena

Image	Arena	City	State	Team	Conference	Capacity	Opened
	Cadet Ice Arena	USAF Academy	CO	Air Force	Atlantic Hockey America	2,217	1968
	Tate Rink	West Point	NY	Army	Atlantic Hockey America	2,648	1985
	Bentley Arena	Waltham	MA	Bentley	Atlantic Hockey America	2,117	2018
	LECOM Harborcenter	Buffalo	NY	Canisius	Atlantic Hockey America	1,800	2014
	Fred Rust Ice Arena	Newark	DE	Delaware	Atlantic Hockey America	2,500	1971
	Hart Center	Worcester	MA	Holy Cross	Atlantic Hockey America (men); Hockey East (women)	1,600	1975
	Mercyhurst Ice Center	Erie	PA	Mercyhurst men & women	Atlantic Hockey America (women only in 2026–27)	1,500	1991
	Dwyer Arena	Lewiston (Note: The mailing address of the Niagara campus, which includes the arena, is Niagara University.)	NY	Niagara	Atlantic Hockey America	2,100	1996
	Gene Polisseni Center	Rochester (Note: Mailing address; the physical location is Henrietta.)	NY	RIT men & women	Atlantic Hockey America	4,300	2014
	Martire Family Arena	Fairfield	CT	Sacred Heart men & women	Atlantic Hockey America (men); NEWHA (women)	3,600	2023
	Tennity Ice Skating Pavilion	Syracuse	NY	Syracuse women	Atlantic Hockey America	350	2000
	Yost Ice Arena	Ann Arbor	MI	Michigan	Big Ten	5,800	1923
	Munn Ice Arena	East Lansing	MI	Michigan State	Big Ten	6,470	1974
	3M Arena at Mariucci	Minneapolis	MN	Minnesota men	Big Ten	10,000	1993
	Compton Family Ice Arena	Notre Dame	IN	Notre Dame	Big Ten	5,022	2011
	Value City Arena	Columbus	OH	Ohio State men	Big Ten	17,500	1998
	Pegula Ice Arena	University Park (Note: Mailing address; the physical location is College Township.)	PA	Penn State men & women	Big Ten (men); Atlantic Hockey America (women)	6,014	2013
	Kohl Center	Madison	WI	Wisconsin men	Big Ten	15,325	1998
	Midco Arena	Sioux Falls	SD	Augustana	CCHA (men)	3,082	
	Sanford Center	Bemidji	MN	Bemidji State men & women	CCHA (men); WCHA (women)	4,373	2010
	Slater Family Ice Arena	Bowling Green	OH	Bowling Green	CCHA	5,000	1967
	Ewigleben Arena	Big Rapids	MI	Ferris State	CCHA	2,500	1976
	Taffy Abel Arena	Sault Ste. Marie	MI	Lake Superior State	CCHA	4,000	1995
	MacInnes Student Ice Arena	Houghton	MI	Michigan Tech	CCHA	4,466	1972
	Mayo Clinic Health System Event Center	Mankato	MN	Minnesota State men & women	CCHA (men); WCHA (women)	4,832	1995
	Berry Events Center	Marquette	MI	Northern Michigan	CCHA	3,800	1999
	Lee and Penny Anderson Arena	Saint Paul	MN	St. Thomas	CCHA (men) (NCHC in 2026); WCHA (women)	4,000	2025
	Meehan Auditorium	Providence	RI	Brown men & women	ECAC	3,100	1961
	Cheel Arena	Potsdam	NY	Clarkson men & women	ECAC	3,000	1991
	Class of 1965 Arena	Hamilton	NY	Colgate men & women	ECAC	2,222	2016
	Lynah Rink	Ithaca	NY	Cornell men & women	ECAC	4,267	1967
	Thompson Arena	Hanover	NH	Dartmouth men & women	ECAC	3,500	1975
	Bright-Landry Hockey Center	Boston (Note: The arena is within the Boston city limits, but has an Allston mailing address.)	MA	Harvard men & women	ECAC	2,850	1956
	Hobey Baker Memorial Rink	Princeton	NJ	Princeton men & women	ECAC	2,092	1923
	M&T Bank Arena	Hamden	CT	Quinnipiac men & women	ECAC	3,386	2007
	Houston Field House	Troy	NY	RPI men & women	ECAC	4,780	1949
	Appleton Arena	Canton	NY	St. Lawrence men & women	ECAC	3,000	1951
	M&T Bank Center	Schenectady	NY	Union men & women	ECAC	2,200	2025
	Ingalls Rink	New Haven	CT	Yale men & women	ECAC	3,500	1958
	Conte Forum	Boston (Note: The arena is within the Boston city limits, but has a Chestnut Hill mailing address.)	MA	Boston College men & women	Hockey East	7,884	1988
	Agganis Arena	Boston	MA	Boston University men	Hockey East	6,150	2005
	Walter Brown Arena	Boston	MA	Boston University women	Hockey East	3,806	1971
	Toscano Family Ice Forum	Storrs	CT	UConn men & women	Hockey East	2,600	2023
	Alfond Arena	Orono	ME	Maine men & women	Hockey East	5,124	1977
	William D. Mullins Memorial Center	Amherst	MA	Massachusetts	Hockey East	8,387	1993
	Paul E. Tsongas Center at UMass Lowell	Lowell	MA	Massachusetts-Lowell	Hockey East	6,003	1998
	J. Thom Lawler Rink	North Andover	MA	Merrimack men & women	Hockey East	2,549	1972
	Whittemore Center	Durham	NH	New Hampshire men & women	Hockey East	6,501	1995
	Matthews Arena	Boston	MA	Northeastern men & women	Hockey East	4,666	1910
	Schneider Arena	Providence	RI	Providence men & women	Hockey East	3,030	1973
	Gutterson Fieldhouse	Burlington	VT	Vermont men & women	Hockey East	4,035	1963
	Carlson Center	Fairbanks	AK	Alaska	Independent	4,595	1990
	Seawolf Sports Complex	Anchorage	AK	Alaska Anchorage	Independent	900	1977
	Centene Community Ice Center	Maryland Heights	MO	Lindenwood men & women	Independent (men); CHA (women)	2,500	2019
	Northwell Health Ice Center	East Meadow	NY	LIU men & women	Independent (men); NEWHA (women)	500	
	Foxboro Sports Center	Foxborough	MA	Stonehill men & women	Independent (men); NEWHA (women)	700	2004
	Mullett Arena	Tempe	AZ	Arizona State	NCHC	5,000	2022
	Ed Robson Arena	Colorado Springs	CO	Colorado College	NCHC	3,407	2021
	Magness Arena	Denver	CO	Denver	NCHC	6,026	1999
	Goggin Ice Center	Oxford	OH	Miami (OH)	NCHC	3,200	2006
	AMSOIL Arena	Duluth	MN	Minnesota Duluth men & women	NCHC (men); WCHA (women)	6,756	2010
	Ralph Engelstad Arena	Grand Forks	ND	North Dakota men	NCHC	11,568	2001
	Baxter Arena	Omaha	NE	Omaha	NCHC	7,898	2015
	Brooks Center	St. Cloud	MN	St. Cloud State men & women	NCHC (men); WCHA (women)	5,159	1989
	Lawson Arena	Kalamazoo	MI	Western Michigan	NCHC	3,667	1974
	Jason Ritchie Ice Arena	Winchendon	MA	Franklin Pierce women	NEWHA	500	2008
	SportsCenter of Connecticut	Shelton	CT	Post women	NEWHA	—N/a	
	Thomas F. Sullivan Arena	Goffstown	NH	Saint Anselm women	NEWHA	2,700	2003
	Cairns Arena	South Burlington	VT	Saint Michael's women	NEWHA	600	
	Ridder Arena	Minneapolis	MN	Minnesota women	WCHA	3,400	2002
	OSU Ice Rink	Columbus	OH	Ohio State women	WCHA	1,000	1961
	LaBahn Arena	Madison	WI	Wisconsin women	WCHA	2,273	2012
	Robert Morris University Island Sports Center	Neville Township	PA	Robert Morris men & women	AHA (men & women)	1,200	1998

== Additional arenas ==
Off-campus arena

Image	Arena	City	State	Team	Conference	Capacity	Opened
	Little Caesars Arena	Detroit	MI	Michigan Tech	CCHA	19,150	2017
	Erie Insurance Arena	Erie	PA	Mercyhurst	Atlantic Hockey America	6,716	1983
	Blue Cross Arena	Rochester	NY	RIT	Atlantic Hockey America	11,200	1955
	Islanders Iceworks	Syosset	NY	LIU men & women	Independent (men); NEWHA (women)	—N/a	
	Bridgewater Ice Arena	Bridgewater	MA	Stonehill men & women	Independent (men); NEWHA (women)	—N/a	1995
	PeoplesBank Arena	Hartford	CT	UConn Men	Hockey East	14,750	1975

== Future arenas ==
This list includes both arenas under construction and existing venues to be used by programs that are confirmed to be joining Division I hockey in the future.

Off-campus arena

Image	Arena	City	State	Team	Conference	Capacity	Opened/opening
	Kalamazoo Event Center	Kalamazoo	MI	Western Michigan	NCHC	6,500	2027
	Maryville University Hockey Center	Chesterfield	MO	Maryville	Independent	2,000	2019
	To be announced	Nashville	TN	Tennessee State	Independent	TBD	TBD
	New Northeastern arena	Boston	MA	Northeastern men & women	Hockey East	4,050	2028
	Seawolf Sports Complex (New Ice Arena)	Anchorage	AK	Alaska Anchorage	Independent	3,000	TBA

== See also ==
- List of indoor arenas in the United States
