= NCAA Division I women's ice hockey conferences and teams =

The following is a list of women's college ice hockey programs (teams) that participate in Division I of the National Collegiate Athletic Association (NCAA) and compete for berths in the annual National Collegiate Women's Ice Hockey Championship. Programs (teams) are sorted by the conferences in which they play.

== Atlantic Hockey America (AHA) ==
Atlantic Hockey America is a college ice hockey conference which operates primarily in the northeastern United States. It participates in NCAA Division I as an ice hockey-only conference. The conference was formed in 2024 via the merger of the men-only Atlantic Hockey Association and the women-only College Hockey America (CHA). The University of Delaware will join the AHA in the 2025–26 season.

- Delaware Fightin' Blue Hens women's ice hockey (joined 2025)
- Lindenwood Lady Lions ice hockey (joined 2012)
- Mercyhurst Lakers women's ice hockey (original member from 2002)
- Penn State Nittany Lions women's ice hockey (joined 2012)
- Robert Morris Colonials women's ice hockey (joined in 2005, left in 2021, returned in 2023)
- RIT Tigers women's ice hockey (joined 2012)
- Syracuse Orange women's ice hockey (joined 2008)

The AHA conference champion currently receives an automatic bid to the NCAA Championship Tournament. The demise of the Robert Morris program after the 2020–21 season reduced the then-CHA's membership to five, one fewer than the six required to qualify for an automatic bid. Under current NCAA rules, any conference with an automatic bid that drops below six members has two years to restore its membership to the required six before losing its automatic bid. This issue became moot when Robert Morris reinstated its program and rejoined CHA effective during the 2023–24 season.

== ECAC Hockey ==
Located in the northeastern United States, ECAC Hockey has changed to meet the needs of the exploding collegiate sport as 24 teams have called ECAC Hockey home since the first regional championship was contested in 1984. Clarkson became the first non-WCHA team to win the national championship when it defeated the Minnesota Golden Gophers in the 2014 Frozen Four, and has since won titles in 2017 and 2018.

- Brown Bears women's ice hockey
- Clarkson Golden Knights women's ice hockey
- Colgate Raiders women's ice hockey
- Cornell Big Red women's ice hockey
- Dartmouth Big Green women's ice hockey
- Harvard Crimson women's ice hockey
- Princeton Tigers women's ice hockey
- Quinnipiac Bobcats women's ice hockey
- RPI Engineers women's ice hockey
- St. Lawrence Saints women's ice hockey
- Union Garnet Chargers women's ice hockey
- Yale Bulldogs women's ice hockey

It is the only NCAA Division I hockey conference whose members all field varsity teams for both men and women.

=== Ivy League ===
Several universities with programs in ECAC Hockey are also members of the Ivy League conference. All six Ivy League schools with ice hockey programs participate in NCAA competition as members of ECAC Hockey and, therefore, ice hockey does not function as a sponsored Ivy League sport. The conference honors women's ice hockey players from its member institutions with annual selection of the Ivy League player of the year, rookie of the year, and All-Ivy teams.

- Brown Bears women's ice hockey
- Cornell Big Red women's ice hockey
- Dartmouth Big Green women's ice hockey
- Harvard Crimson women's ice hockey
- Princeton Tigers women's ice hockey
- Yale Bulldogs women's ice hockey

== Hockey East Association (HEA) ==
Hockey East (officially the Hockey East Association) is a college ice hockey conference which operates in New England and features men's and women's competition. The women's side of the conference is also known as Women's Hockey East Association (WHEA) and, throughout its history, has exclusively included programs based in New England. The conference is regarded as one of the top women's ice hockey conferences in United States.

- Boston College Eagles women's ice hockey
- Boston University Terriers women's ice hockey
- UConn Huskies women's ice hockey
- Holy Cross Crusaders women's ice hockey
- Maine Black Bears women's ice hockey
- Merrimack Warriors women's ice hockey
- New Hampshire Wildcats women's ice hockey
- Northeastern Huskies women's ice hockey
- Providence Friars women's ice hockey
- Vermont Catamounts women's ice hockey

== New England Women's Hockey Alliance (NEWHA) ==
The newest conference to receive NCAA Division I recognition in ice hockey is the New England Women's Hockey Alliance. The NEWHA formed in 2017 as a scheduling alliance between the sport's six then-existing National Collegiate (Division I/II) independents, all located in New England. Of these schools, Sacred Heart was the only one that played at the National Collegiate level before 2017, having competed as an independent since 2003. The other five charter members, which all began National Collegiate play in 2017, consisted of one Division I member (Holy Cross) and four Division II members (Franklin Pierce, Post, Saint Anselm, and Saint Michael's). Holy Cross left after the first NEWHA season of 2017–18 to join Hockey East. Shortly before the 2018–19 season, the remaining five members formally organized as a conference and began the process of gaining full NCAA recognition.

In the meantime, LIU Brooklyn announced it would add women's ice hockey effective in 2019–20, and would join the NEWHA at that time. Shortly after this announcement, the school's parent institution, Long Island University (LIU), announced that it would merge the athletic programs of its two main campuses (Division I Brooklyn and Division II Post) into a single Division I program that would later be unveiled as the LIU Sharks.

With the conference membership returning to six for the 2019–20 season, the NCAA officially approved the NEWHA as a Division I conference shortly before the start of that season. This action also meant that no independent programs existed in that season, since the NEWHA membership included all of the previous National Collegiate independents. The NEWHA received its first automatic NCAA tournament berth in 2021–22. Stonehill had originally planned to begin varsity play in the 2021–22 season as the NEWHA's seventh member, but due to recruiting issues brought on by COVID-19, delayed its debut until the 2022–23 season.

Another Division II school, Assumption, joined the NEWHA for administrative purposes alongside Stonehill in 2022–23, but did not start varsity play until 2023–24.

- Assumption Greyhounds women's ice hockey
- Franklin Pierce Ravens women's ice hockey
- LIU Sharks women's ice hockey
- Post Eagles women's ice hockey
- Sacred Heart Pioneers women's ice hockey
- Saint Anselm Hawks women's ice hockey
- Saint Michael's Purple Knights women's ice hockey
- Stonehill Skyhawks women's ice hockey

== Western Collegiate Hockey Association (WCHA) ==
The Western Collegiate Hockey Association is an NCAA Division I women's-only conference operating in the northern Midwest states of Ohio, Minnesota, and Wisconsin. Apart from the three titles won by Clarkson, every other National Collegiate women's title has been won by a WCHA team.

- Bemidji State Beavers women's ice hockey
- Minnesota Golden Gophers women's ice hockey
- Minnesota Duluth Bulldogs women's ice hockey
- Minnesota State Mavericks women's ice hockey
- Ohio State Buckeyes women's ice hockey
- St. Cloud State Huskies women's ice hockey
- St. Thomas Tommies women's ice hockey
- Wisconsin Badgers women's ice hockey

The WCHA was founded in 1951 as a men-only league. Women's competition was introduced in 1999. After seven of ten men's WCHA members left the conference after the 2020–21 season to reestablish the Central Collegiate Hockey Association, the WCHA disbanded its men's division and has since operated as a women-only league.
