= NCAA Division I independent schools (ice hockey) =

NCAA Division I independent schools are teams that compete in NCAA ice hockey but are not members of a conference. There are several current schools who, at one time or another, competed as Division I independents. Beginning in the 2025–26 season, the independent schools will compete for the United Collegiate Hockey Cup, an end-of-season tournament that will function as a de facto conference championship.

== Current independent programs ==
=== Men ===
Institution	Team	Location	Founded	Type	Enrollment	Years	Primary Conference
Long Island University	Sharks	Brooklyn & Brookville, New York	1926	Private	15,197 (Note: Combined entollment at LIU's Brooklyn and Post (Brookville) campuses. The hockey team is open to undergraduates at both campuses who meet NCAA eligibility requirements.)	2020–present	Northeast Conference
University of Alaska Anchorage	Seawolves	Anchorage, Alaska	1954	Public	15,174	1984–1985; 1988–1993; 2022–present	GNAC
University of Alaska Fairbanks	Nanooks	Fairbanks, Alaska	1917	Public	6,813	1925–1985; 1988–1993; 2021–present	GNAC
Lindenwood University	Lions	St. Charles, Missouri	1827	Private	6,491	2022–present	Ohio Valley Conference
Stonehill College	Skyhawks	Easton, Massachusetts	1948	Private	2,500	2022–present	Northeast Conference

== Future independent programs ==
=== Men ===
Institution	Team	Location	Founded	Type	Enrollment	Beginning Play	Primary Conference
Maryville University	Saints	Town and Country, Missouri	1872	Private	8,811	2027 (planned)	Great Lakes Valley Conference
Tennessee State University	Tigers	Nashville, Tennessee	1912	Public (HBCU)	8,198	TBD	Ohio Valley Conference

== History of current independents ==
NCAA Division I independents within the Contiguous United States
NCAA Division I independents in Alaska

Alaska played infrequently as an independent program prior to 1985. It returned to independent status after the Great West Hockey Conference dissolved in 1988 and then joined the CCHA in 1995. The team was one of two final members of the men's division of the WCHA in 2021 and formally dissolved the men's side of the conference in 2021 (the WCHA remains in operation as a women-only league).

Alaska-Anchorage first moved to D1 status in hockey in 1984, and played its first couple years as an independent before joining the newly founded GWHC alongside the Nanooks. After it dissolved, the Seawolves also played as an independent before joining the WCHA in 1994, around the same time Alaska joined the nearby CCHA. In 2020, the University of Alaska announced that UAA hockey would be cut after the 2020–21 season due to a reduction in state funding unless the program could raise 3 million dollars, and the program went on hiatus that year while its future was uncertain. Ultimately, the program was saved, and it returned to play in the 2022–23 season as an independent, following the dissolution of the men's side of its former conference, the WCHA.

The LIU Sharks launched their men's program for the 2020–21 season, a year after starting a women's ice hockey program.

With the 2020–21 season dramatically impacted by COVID-19, LIU was in a scheduling alliance with a Division I conferences for that season, Atlantic Hockey.

In 2021–22, Lindenwood fielded two separate men's club teams, each playing at a different level of the American Collegiate Hockey Association (ACHA), which governs the sport at club level. On March 23, 2022, Lindenwood announced that it would launch a Division I men's varsity program starting in the 2022–23 season, while maintaining its ACHA program. This announcement came shortly after the school announced it was starting a transition from Division II to Division I in July 2022, joining the non-hockey Ohio Valley Conference.

On April 5, 2022, Stonehill, then a member of the D-II Northeast-10 Conference (NE-10), announced it was joining the Northeast Conference (which also does not sponsor ice hockey) that July, starting its own transition to D-I. Before this announcement, Stonehill had been one of seven NE-10 members that played men's ice hockey under Division II regulations, despite the NCAA not sponsoring a championship event at that level. (All other D-II schools with varsity men's ice hockey play under D-I regulations.)

=== Women ===
No women's program has competed as an independent in the National Collegiate division of women's ice hockey, the de facto equivalent of Division I in that sport, since the 2018–19 season. The NCAA has never sponsored a Division II championship in the sport, although it does sponsor a Division III championship.

Five schools competed as independents in the 2018–19 season, all participating in the nascent New England Women's Hockey Alliance (NEWHA), which had originally been established in 2017 as a scheduling alliance among all of the then-current National Collegiate independents. The NEWHA initially included six schools, but Holy Cross left after the inaugural 2017–18 NEWHA season to join Hockey East. The NEWHA officially organized as a conference in advance of the 2018–19 season, but was not officially recognized by the NCAA as a Division I league until the 2019–20 season, by which time the newly launched LIU program had joined as the sixth member.

The newest National Collegiate hockey school is Assumption, which joined the NEWHA for administrative purposes in 2022 but did not start conference play until launching its varsity team a year later. Also, Robert Morris, which had dropped the sport after the 2020–21 season due to COVID-19 impacts, resumed play in 2023–24, returning to its previous conference of College Hockey America (CHA). After the 2023–24 season, CHA merged with the men-only Atlantic Hockey Association, which RMU had rejoined in 2023, to form Atlantic Hockey America. RMU continues to field both teams in the merged conference.

== Arenas ==
School	Arena	Location	Capacity
Alaska	Carlson Center	Fairbanks, Alaska	4,595
Alaska Anchorage	Seawolf Sports Complex	Anchorage, Alaska	800
Lindenwood	Centene Community Ice Center	Maryland Heights, Missouri	2,500
Long Island	Northwell Health Ice Center	East Meadow, New York	500
Stonehill	Bridgewater Ice Arena	Bridgewater, Massachusetts	1,000

== Current programs which were at one point independent ==
=== Men ===
School	Years	Subsequent conference	Notes
Air Force Falcons	1968–1999	CHA	Joined the Atlantic Hockey Association in 2006. After the 2024 merger of the Association and CHA, now plays in Atlantic Hockey America.
Arizona State Sun Devils	2015–2023	NCHC	Joined the National Collegiate Hockey Conference (NCHC) in 2024.
Army Black Knights	1903–1961; 1991–1999	ECAC; CHA	Joined the Atlantic Hockey Association in 2000. After the 2024 merger of the Association and CHA, now plays in Atlantic Hockey America.
Bemidji State Beavers	1947–1950	dropped program	Bemidji returned to Division I in 1999 as a charter member of College Hockey America, and moved to the WCHA for 2010–11. The Beavers were among the schools that revived the CCHA in 2021.
Boston College Eagles	1917–1961	ECAC	Currently competes in Hockey East.
Boston University Terriers	1917–1943; 1945–1961	suspended program ECAC	Currently competes in Hockey East.
Brown Bears	1897–1906; 1926–1961	dropped program ECAC	
Clarkson Golden Knights	1920–1950	Tri-State League	Clarkson was a member of the Tri-State League concurrently with ECAC from 1961 until the Tri-State's dissolution in 1972.
Colgate Raiders	1915–1917; 1920–1950; 1957–1961	dropped program Tri-State League; ECAC	Colgate dropped their program in 1951 due to the lack of an indoor facility but returned to the ice in 1957.
Colorado College Tigers	1937–1951; 1958–1959	MCHL; WCHA	Joined the National Collegiate Hockey Conference (NCHC) in 2013.
Cornell Big Red	1900–1903; 1906–1916; 1920–1931; 1933–1948; 1957–1961	dropped program suspended program suspended program dropped program ECAC	
Dartmouth Big Green	1905–1918; 1919–1961	suspended program ECAC	
Denver Pioneers	1949–1951; 1958–1959	MCHL; WCHA	Joined the NCHC in 2013.
Harvard Crimson	1897–1917; 1918–1943; 1945–1961	suspended program suspended program ECAC	
UMass Minutemen	1908–1939; 1947–1951; 1953–1961; 1993–1994	dropped program dropped program ECAC Hockey; Hockey East	Joined ECAC 2 in 1964. Dropped program from 1979 until 1993.
Merrimack Warriors	1956–1961	ECAC Hockey	Joined ECAC 2 in 1964. Returned to Division I in 1985 as a D1 independent then joined Hockey East in 1989.
Miami RedHawks	1978–1980	CCHA	Joined the NCHC in 2013.
Michigan Wolverines	1922–1951	MCHL	Was also a member of the Big Ten from 1958 through 1981. Moved to CCHA in 1981. Joined the new Big Ten men's hockey league in 2013.
Michigan State Spartans	1921–1930; 1949–1951	dropped program MCHL	Was also a member of the Big Ten from 1958 through 1981. Moved to CCHA in 1981. Joined the new Big Ten men's hockey league in 2013.
Michigan Tech Huskies	1919–1951; 1958–1959	MCHL; WCHA	Played in the CCHA from 1981–84. Re-joined the WCHA in 1984; became part of the revived CCHA in 2021.
Minnesota Golden Gophers	1921–1951	MCHL	Was also a member of the Big Ten from 1958 through 1981. Joined the new Big Ten men's hockey league in 2013.
Minnesota–Duluth Bulldogs	1930–1932; 1946–1949; 1961–1965	dropped program MIAC; WCHA	Joined the NCHC in 2013.
Minnesota State Mavericks	1996–1999	WCHA	After moving up from Division II and before joining the WCHA. Became a member of the revived CCHA in 2021.
New Hampshire Wildcats	1924–1961	ECAC	Currently competes in Hockey East.
Niagara Purple Eagles	1997–1999	CHA	Niagara began varsity hockey in 1997, and became a charter member of the CHA in 1999. They moved to the Atlantic Hockey Association for 2010–11, and became members of Atlantic Hockey America upon the Association's merger with CHA after the 2023–24 season.
North Dakota Fighting Hawks	1929–1936; 1946–1951; 1958–1959	dropped program MCHL; WCHA	Joined the NCHC in 2013.
Northeastern Huskies	1929–1961	ECAC Hockey	Currently competes in Hockey East.
Northern Michigan Wildcats	1976–1977	CCHA	Joined the WCHA in 2013; joined the revived CCHA in 2021.
Notre Dame Fighting Irish	1912–1927; 1968–1971; 1984–1991	dropped program WCHA; CCHA	Left the CCHA in 2013 for Hockey East; moved to the Big Ten in 2017.
Ohio State Buckeyes	1963–1971; 1973–1975	CCHA; CCHA	Joined the new Big Ten men's hockey league in 2013.
Penn State Nittany Lions	1940–1944; 1946–1947; 2012–2013	suspended program dropped program Big Ten	In September 2010, Penn State announced they would add men's and women's NCAA Division I hockey programs in 2012, competing in their first season as an independent. In March 2011, the Big Ten Conference announced that Michigan, Michigan State, and Ohio State would leave the CCHA, and Minnesota and Wisconsin announced that they would leave the WCHA to form a Big Ten hockey conference to begin play in the 2013–14 season.
Princeton Tigers	1899–1961	ECAC	
Providence Friars	1926–1927; 1952–1954; 1955–1961	dropped program Northeast League; ECAC	Currently competes in Hockey East.
RPI Engineers	1901–1950	Tri-State League	Rensselaer was a member of the Tri-State League concurrently with ECAC from 1961 until the Tri-State's dissolution in 1972.
RIT Tigers	2005–2006	Atlantic Hockey	Played first year of its probation period after joining Division I as an independent. Became members of Atlantic Hockey America after Atlantic Hockey's merger with CHA in 2024.
Sacred Heart Pioneers	1993–1998	MAAC	Became founding members of the Atlantic Hockey Association when it spun off from the MAAC after the 2002–03 season. Sacred Heart's membership transferred to Atlantic Hockey America upon the Association's 2024 merger with CHA.
St. Cloud State Huskies	1931–1942; 1946–1961; 1987–1990	dropped program College Division; WCHA	Dropped their program during World War II. Relegated to second-tier level when the division was formalized in 1961. Joined the NCHC in 2013.
St. Lawrence Saints	1925–1930; 1938–1950	dropped program Tri-State League	St. Lawrence was a member of the Tri-State League concurrently with ECAC from 1961 until the Tri-State's dissolution in 1972.
Union Dutchmen	1903–1904; 1905–1911; 1919–1920; 1921–1942; 1947–1949	dropped program dropped program suspended program suspended program dropped program	Resumed playing in 1975 with ECAC 2. Returned to Division I in 1991 with ECAC Hockey.
Wisconsin Badgers	1921–1935; 1963–1969	dropped program WCHA	Joined the new Big Ten men's hockey league in 2013.
Yale Bulldogs	1895–1961	ECAC	Yale is the oldest active NCAA program.

=== Women ===
School	Years	Subsequent conference	Notes
Clarkson Golden Knights	2003–2004	ECAC	Played the first year of their program as an independent before joining the ECAC.
Franklin Pierce Ravens	2017–2019	NEWHA	Moved from the Division III NEHC in 2017, joining the NEWHA. Left independent status upon NCAA recognition of the NEWHA.
Holy Cross Crusaders	2017–2018	Hockey East	After playing as a de facto Division III program from the varsity program's creation in 1999–2000, joined the NEWHA at its formation in 2017–18 before moving to Hockey East the following season.
Lindenwood Lady Lions	2011–2012	CHA	The university competed as an independent for the 2011–12 season during the transition process of joining the NCAA from NAIA, during which, the team was reclassifying from ACHA Division I to NCAA Division I. Lindenwood placed an application in Fall 2011 and was accepted as a member of CHA starting in the 2012–13 season. After the 2023–24 season, CHA merged with the men-only Atlantic Hockey Association to create the current Atlantic Hockey America.
Post Eagles	2017–2019	NEWHA	Played inaugural women's hockey season of 2016–17 as a Division III independent ineligible for postseason play. Joined the NEWHA at its formation in 2017 and left independent status upon NCAA recognition of the NEWHA.
Quinnipiac Bobcats	2002–2004	CHA	Left the ECAC after 2002 and spent two years playing as an independent before joining the CHA. They returned to the ECAC after one season in the CHA.
RPI Engineers	2005–2006	ECAC	Moved up from Division III (where they were a member of the ECAC East) in 2005.
Sacred Heart Pioneers	2003–2019	NEWHA	Moved from the Division III ECAC East in 2003. Founding member of the NEWHA in 2017; left independent status upon NCAA recognition of that league.
Saint Anselm Hawks	2017–2019	NEWHA	Moved from the Division III NEHC in 2017, joining the NEWHA. Left independent status upon NCAA recognition of the NEWHA.
Saint Michael's Purple Knights	2017–2019	NEWHA	Moved from the Division III NEHC in 2017, joining the NEWHA. Left independent status upon NCAA recognition of the NEWHA.
UConn Huskies	2000–2001	ECAC	Played the first year of their program as an independent before joining the ECAC, and moved to Hockey East in 2002.

== Defunct teams ==
=== Men ===
School	Years	Subsequent conference	Notes
Alabama–Huntsville Chargers	1987–1992; 1998–1999; 2010–2013	Division II; CHA; WCHA	The Chargers first competed as a Division I independent between stints in Division II. After winning 2 championships and finishing as runners-up twice more, UAH returned to Division I in 1998, spending one season as an independent before becoming a charter member of College Hockey America. Following the demise of the men's side of CHA, and being denied entry to the CCHA, the Chargers were independent for three seasons (2010–11 to 2012–13) until joining the Western Collegiate Hockey Association beginning in the 2013–14 season. The team was temporarily suspended in 2021. The university currently plans to bring the program back when they secure placement in a Division I conference.
Carnegie Tech Tartans	1905–1909; 1920–1921	Intercollegiate League dropped program	The program was suspended after 1910 when the Intercollegiate League collapsed. The team resurfaced in 1937 in the Penn-Ohio League but discontinued the program in 1940.
Case Rough Riders	1909–1911	dropped program	The team resurfaced in 1938 in the Penn-Ohio League but discontinued the program after the collapse of the conference in 1941.
Columbia Lions	1896–1915; 1920–1923; 1937–1938	dropped program dropped program dropped program	
Johns Hopkins Blue Jays	1894–1898	dropped program	Johns Hopkins played the first two intercollegiate games against Yale in 1896.
Kent State Golden Flashes	1985–1992	CCHA	Program folded in 1994.
Illinois Fighting Illini	1937–1943	dropped program	
UIC Flames	1981–1982	CCHA	Moved up from Division II in 1981. Program folded in 1996.
MIT Engineers	1900–1961	ECAC	The program joined the lower-tier division in 1964 and was dropped in 1975.
Northern Arizona Lumberjacks	1980–1985	GWHC	Folded their program after one season in the GWHC due to rink problems.
Penn Quakers	1896–1899; 1900–1901; 1908–1911; 1919–1924; 1928–1930; 1958–1967	suspended program dropped program dropped program dropped program dropped program ECAC	Program ended after the 1977–78 season.
Pittsburgh Panthers	1906–1909	Intercollegiate League	Began play in the WPHL. The program was dropped when the Intercollegiate League collapsed in 1910. The team restarted with the inception of the Penn-Ohio League in 1937 but was suspended after just two seasons.
Saint Louis Billikens	1970–1971	CCHA	St. Louis was a founding member of the CCHA and continued with the conference until the program was demoted to club status in 1979. They currently play as an unrecognized Division II team.
Syracuse Orange	1911–1913; 1923–1928; 1939–1940	dropped program dropped program dropped program	
US International Gulls	1979–1985	GWHC	Dropped their program in 1988.
Villanova Wildcats	1929–1932	dropped program	Returned as a Division III team and later dropped their program again after the 1997–1998 season for Title IX reasons.
Western Reserve Red Cats	1909–1911	dropped program	The team resurfaced in 1937 in the Penn-Ohio League but discontinued the program after the collapse of the conference in 1941.

=== Women ===
School	Years	Subsequent conference	Notes
North Dakota Fighting Hawks	2002–2004	WCHA	Played the first years of their program as an independent before joining the WCHA. Dropped women's ice hockey after the 2016–17 season.

== See also ==
- List of NCAA Division I ice hockey programs
- NCAA Division I independent schools
- NCAA Division II independent schools (ice hockey)
- United Collegiate Hockey Cup
