= Tindra Holm =

Swedish ice hockey player (born 2001)

- Born: 26 May 2001 (age 24) Skellefteå, Sweden
- Height: 172 cm (5 ft 8 in)
- Position: Goaltender
- Catches: Right
- NCAA team Former teams: LIU Sharks: Luleå HF/MSSK; MODO Hockey; Skellefteå AIK; IF Björklöven
- National team: Sweden
- Playing career: 2013–present

Tindra Holm (born 26 May 2001) is a Swedish college ice hockey goaltender for the LIU Sharks of the National Collegiate Athletic Association (NCAA).

== Playing career ==
Growing up in Kåge, just outside Skellefteå, Holm mostly played on boys' teams, but spent some time with the Damettan sides of Clemensnäs HC and IF Björklöven between 2013 and 2016. In 2016, she was named to Västerbotten's team for TV-pucken, the fifth girl in history to participate in the tournament.

From 2016 to 2018, she played for the Skellefteå AIK U16 boys' teams. She was loaned to Luleå HF/MSSK in the Swedish Women's Hockey League (SDHL), the top flight of Swedish women's hockey, for a game in December 2016. Luleå won 11–0, with Holm picking up a shutout on her SDHL debut as a 15-year-old.

In 2018, Holm signed with MODO Hockey, serving as the club's SDHL backup goaltender. She picked up another shutout on her MODO debut, her second SDHL shutout in as many games, as the club defeated Göteborg HC 4–0.

She left MODO after two seasons, returning to Luleå HF for the 2020–21 season.

Holm joined the LIU Sharks ice hockey program of Long Island University as an incoming freshman for the 2021–22 NCAA Division I women's ice hockey season. She was named NEWHA Rookie of the Week for the week of 5 October 2021 and earned NEWHA Goaltender of the Week honors for the week of 23 November after making 60 saves on 63 shots for a .950 (95%) save percentage across back-to-back victories over Saint Anselm.

In 2024, Holm became the first player in conference history to win back-to-back NEWHA Goaltender of the Year Awards. During the 2023-24 season, the Sharks gained a program record 26 wins, highlighted by finishing the regular season on a 12 game winning streak.

== International play ==
Holm represented Sweden at the 2019 IIHF World Women's U18 Championship.

Holm was selected to the Swedish national team for the 2023 IIHF Women's World Championship as the third goalie behind Emma Söderberg and Sara Grahn. She traveled and practiced with the team but did not dress for any games of the tournament.

On 12 January 2026, she was named to Sweden's roster to compete at the 2026 Winter Olympics.

== Awards and Honors ==
- 2023 NEWHA Goaltender of the Year
- 2023 NEWHA First Team All-Star
- 2024 NEWHA Goaltender of the Year

== Personal life ==
Holm's father, Krister Holm, has been the goaltending coach for Skellefteå AIK in the Swedish Hockey League (SHL) since 2006.
