= NCAA Division I independent schools =

Four-year institutions

NCAA Division I independent schools are four-year institutions that compete in college athletics at the NCAA Division I level, but do not belong to an established athletic conference for a particular sport. These schools may however still compete as members of an athletic conference in other sports. A school may also be fully independent, and not belong to any athletic conference for any sport at all. The reason for independent status varies among institutions, but it is frequently because the school's primary athletic conference does not sponsor a particular sport.

== Full independents ==
There are no schools competing as a full independent for the 2025-26 season. The most recent full independent, Chicago State, joined the Northeast Conference (NEC) after the conclusion of the 2023-24 season.

=== Recent independents ===
Institution	Location	Founded	Affiliation	Enrollment	Nickname	Joined (Note: Represents the calendar year when fall sports competition begins.)	Left (Note: Represents the calendar year when spring sports competition ends.)	Colors	Current conference
Chicago State University	Chicago, Illinois	1867	Public (TMCF)	2,620	Cougars	1984; 2006; 2022	1993; 2009; 2024		Northeast (NEC)
University of Denver	Denver, Colorado	1864	Nonsectarian	14,130	Pioneers	1962; 1998	1979; 1999		West Coast (WCC)
University of Hartford	West Hartford, Connecticut	1877	Nonsectarian	6,792	Hawks	2022	2023		C. New England (CNE) (Note: Currently an NCAA Division III athletic conference.)
Mount St. Mary's University	Emmitsburg, Maryland (Note: The Mount St. Mary's campus has an Emmitsburg mailing address, but is located in unincorporated Frederick County.)	1808	Catholic (Archdiocese of Baltimore)	1,889	Mountaineers	1988	1989		Metro
New Jersey Institute of Technology (NJIT)	Newark, New Jersey	1881	Public	11,901	Highlanders	2006; 2013	2008; 2015		America East (AmEast)
Oakland University	Rochester, Michigan (Note: The Oakland campus has a Rochester mailing address, but is located in the separate cities of Auburn Hills and Rochester Hills. The university administration is in Auburn Hills; athletic facilities are in both cities.)	1957	Public	20,519	Golden Grizzlies	1997	1998		Horizon
Saint Francis University	Loretto, Pennsylvania	1847	Catholic (Franciscan)	2,111	Red Wolves	1955	1981		Presidents' (PAC)
University of Wisconsin-Green Bay (Green Bay, UW Green Bay)	Green Bay, Wisconsin	1965	Public	11,188	Phoenix	1981	1982		Horizon
Wright State University	Fairborn, Ohio (Note: The Wright State campus is physically located in Fairborn but has a Dayton mailing address.)	1964	Public	17,074	Raiders	1987	1991		Horizon

== Bowling ==
Bowling, like beach volleyball, is currently a women-only sport at the NCAA level that holds a single national championship open to all NCAA members. As of the 2026-27 season, nine bowling programs compete as independents.

Institution	Location	Founded	Type	Enrollment	Nickname	Primary conference
Baldwin Wallace University	Berea, Ohio	1845	Private	2,592	Yellow Jackets	Ohio (OAC) (Note: Current NCAA Division III athletic conference.)
Edgewood University	Madison, Wisconsin	1927	Private	1,570	Eagles	Northern (NACC)
Louisiana Tech University	Ruston, Louisiana	1894	Public	12,039	Lady Techsters	Sun Belt (Note: Current NCAA Division I athletic conference.)
Merrimack College	North Andover, Massachusetts	1947	Private	3,726	Warriors	Metro
Mount St. Mary's University	Emmitsburg, Maryland (Note: The Mount St. Mary's campus has an Emmitsburg mailing address, but is located in unincorporated Frederick County.)	1808	Private	1,889	Mountaineers	Metro
Rockford University	Rockford, Illinois	1847	Private	1,181	Regents	Northern (NACC)
Shawnee State University	Portsmouth, Ohio	1986	Public	3,257	Bears	Mountain East (MEC) (Note: Current NCAA Division II athletic conference.)
Western Illinois University	Macomb, Illinois	1899	Public	7,643	Leathernecks	Ohio Valley (OVC)
University of Wisconsin-Whitewater	Whitewater, Wisconsin	1868	Public	11,722	Warhawks	Wisconsin (WIAC)

== Football ==
=== Football Bowl Subdivision ===
As of the current 2025 college football season, two NCAA Division I FBS schools are football independents. The ranks of FBS independents dropped by one when UMass became a full member of the Mid-American Conference in 2025.

Institution	Founded	First season	Location	Type	Enrollment	Nickname	Primary conference
University of Notre Dame	1842	1887	Notre Dame, Indiana	Private	12,179	Fighting Irish	Atlantic Coast (ACC) (Note: Notre Dame remains officially an independent football team, and is not a member of the ACC in any capacity for football. However, as part of the agreement to join the ACC in other sports, Notre Dame agreed to schedule 5 games per year against ACC opponents.)
University of Connecticut (UConn)	1881	1896	Storrs, Connecticut (Note: While the UConn campus is in Storrs, the Huskies play home games in East Hartford, Connecticut.)	Public	32,257	Huskies	Big East

=== Football Championship Subdivision ===
As of the 2026 season, two schools, Chicago State and Merrimack, are playing as FCS independents. Chicago State is playing its first season of varsity football as an independent in 2026 before joining the rest of its sports in the NEC (historically known as the Northeast Conference) for 2027. Merrimack left the NEC for the non-football Metro Atlantic Athletic Conference, now known as the Metro Conference, at the end of the 2023-24 school year. Sacred Heart, which also left the NEC for the Metro in 2024 and played as an independent in 2024 and 2025, joined CAA Football in 2026.

Institution	Founded	First season	Location	Type	Enrollment	Nickname	Primary conference
Chicago State University	1867	2026	Chicago, Illinois	Public (TMCF)	2,620	Cougars	NEC
Merrimack College	1947	1996	North Andover, Massachusetts	Private	3,726	Warriors	Metro

== Ice hockey ==
=== Men ===
There are currently six NCAA Division I independents in men's ice hockey - the University of Alaska Fairbanks (branded athletically as simply "Alaska"), the University of Alaska Anchorage, Lindenwood University, Long Island University (LIU), and Stonehill College.

Alaska became a men's independent after the 2020-21 season due to the demise of its former league, the men's side of the Western Collegiate Hockey Association (the WCHA remains in operation as a women-only league). The seven Midwestern members of the men's WCHA left to reestablish the Central Collegiate Hockey Association without the WCHA's three geographic outliers-the two Alaska schools, along with Alabama-Huntsville. Of these three schools, Alaska was the only one that did not initially drop hockey.

Alaska-Anchorage's hockey program was suspended in 2020 by the University of Alaska System due to a reduction in state funding, along with the skiing and gymnastics programs. The 2020-21 season was set to be its last, but due to the COVID-19 pandemic, they did not end up playing that season either. The Alaska Board of Regents told the hockey program they would be reinstated if they were able to collect $3 million in donations and fundraising, so the team was on hiatus for both the 2020-21 and 2021-22 season while its future was uncertain. Ultimately, the money was raised, and the Seawolves were reinstated for the 2022-23 season, but due to the WCHAs aforementioned disbanding, they resumed play as an independent alongside the Nanooks.

LIU announced in late April 2020 that it would launch varsity men's hockey for the 2020-21 season. The Sharks have yet to announce a conference home, but played their first season as a scheduling partner of Atlantic Hockey.

In 2021–22, Lindenwood fielded two separate men's club teams, each playing at a different level of the American Collegiate Hockey Association (ACHA), which governs the sport at club level. On March 23, 2022, Lindenwood announced that it would launch a Division I men's varsity program starting in the 2022-23 season, while maintaining its ACHA program. This announcement came shortly after the school announced it was starting a transition from Division II to Division I in July 2022, joining the non-hockey Ohio Valley Conference.

On April 5, 2022, Stonehill, then a member of the D-II Northeast-10 Conference (NE-10), announced it was joining the Northeast Conference (which also does not sponsor ice hockey) that July, starting its own transition to D-I. Before this announcement, Stonehill had been one of seven NE-10 members that played men's ice hockey under Division II regulations, despite the NCAA not sponsoring a championship event at that level. (All other D-II schools with varsity men's ice hockey play under D-I regulations.)

Neither Lindenwood nor Stonehill has announced a conference home for its men's hockey program.

Institution	Location	Founded	Type	Enrollment	Nickname	Joined	Primary conference
University of Alaska Fairbanks (Alaska)	Fairbanks, Alaska	1917	Public	8,336	Nanooks	2021	Great Northwest (GNAC) (Note: Currently an NCAA Division II athletic conference.)
University of Alaska Anchorage (Alaska-Anchorage)	Anchorage, Alaska	1954	Public	6,813	Seawolves	2022	Great Northwest (GNAC)
Lindenwood University	St. Charles, Missouri	1827	Private	6,491	Lions	2022	Ohio Valley (OVC) (Note: Currently an NCAA Division I athletic conference.)
Long Island University	Brooklyn and Brookville, New York (Note: The current LIU athletic program was created in 2019 with the merger of the athletic programs of the university's two main campuses-the Brooklyn campus, which had been a Division I member, and the Post campus in Brookville, which had competed in Division II. The merged program inherited Brooklyn's Division I membership. The team is open to undergraduate men at both campuses who meet NCAA eligibility requirements.)	1926	Private	15,197	Sharks	2020	Northeast (NEC)
Stonehill College	Easton, Massachusetts	1946	Private	2,500	Skyhawks	2022	Northeast (NEC)

== Soccer ==
=== Women ===
The most recent departure from the independent ranks was Delaware State, who joined the Northeast Conference as an affiliate in women's soccer in 2023.

Institution	Location	Founded	Type	Enrollment	Nickname	Joined	Primary conference
South Carolina State University	Orangeburg, South Carolina	1896	Public	3,000	Lady Bulldogs	2013	Mid-Eastern (MEAC)

== Volleyball ==
=== Men's (indoor) ===
Men's volleyball has a truncated divisional structure in which members of both Division I and Division II compete under identical scholarship limits for a single national championship. Eight men's volleyball programs play as independents; all are D-II members.

Institution	Location	Founded	Type	Enrollment	Nickname	Primary conference
Barry University	Miami Shores, Florida	1940	Private	6,958	Buccaneers	Sunshine State (SSC) (Note: Currently an NCAA Division II athletic conference.)
Catawba College	Salisbury, North Carolina	1851	Private	1,172	Indians	South Atlantic (SAC)
Lincoln Memorial University	Harrogate, Tennessee	1897	Private	2,579	Railsplitters	South Atlantic (SAC)
Newberry College	Newberry, South Carolina	1856	Private	1,521	Wolves	South Atlantic (SAC)
University of Puerto Rico at Bayamón	Bayamón, Puerto Rico	1971	Public	5,014	Cowboys	D-II Independent (Note: While no member of the University of Puerto Rico system is part of a recognized NCAA conference, all are members of Liga Atlética Interuniversitaria de Puerto Rico, which governs college sports competitions in Puerto Rico.)
University of Puerto Rico at Mayagüez	Mayagüez, Puerto Rico	1911	Public	13,146	Tarzans	D-II Independent
University of Puerto Rico, Río Piedras Campus	San Juan, Puerto Rico	1903	Public	18,653	Gallitos	D-II Independent
Tusculum University	Tusculum, Tennessee (Note: Mailing address is Greeneville.)	1794	Private	2,053	Pioneers	South Atlantic (SAC)

=== Women's (beach) ===
Beach volleyball, currently a women-only sport at the NCAA level, holds a single national championship open to members of all three NCAA divisions. The following programs will compete as independents in the 2025 spring season (2024-25 school year).

Institution	Location	Founded	Type	Enrollment	Nickname	Primary conference
Berry College	Mount Berry, Georgia	1902	Private	1,900	Vikings	Southern (SAA) (Note: Currently an NCAA Division III athletic conference.)
California State University, Los Angeles (Cal State-Los Angeles)	Los Angeles, California	1947	Public	27,685	Golden Eagles	California (CCAA) (Note: Currently an NCAA Division II athletic conference.)
Chaminade University of Honolulu	Honolulu, Hawaii	1955	Private	2,836	Silverswords	Pacific West (PacWest)
Colorado Mesa University	Grand Junction, Colorado	1925	Public	11,000	Mavericks	Rocky Mountain (RMAC)
Concordia University Irvine	Irvine, California	1976	Private	2,564	Golden Eagles	Pacific West (PacWest)
East Texas Baptist University	Marshall, Texas	1912	Private	1,771	Tigers	American Southwest (AmSW)
Hawaii Pacific University	Honolulu, Hawaii	1965	Private	4,998	Sharks	Pacific West (PacWest)
Hendrix College	Conway, Arkansas	1876	Private	1,400	Warriors	Southern (SAA)
Huntingdon College	Montgomery, Alabama	1854	Private	900	Hawks	C.C. South (CCS)
LaGrange College	LaGrange, Georgia	1831	Private	1,100	Panthers	C.C. South (CCS)
University of Lynchburg	Lynchburg, Virginia	1903	Private	2,460	Hornets	Old Dominion (ODAC)
University of Mary Hardin-Baylor	Belton, Texas	1845	Private	2,700	Crusaders	American Southwest (AmSW)
McKendree University	Lebanon, Illinois	1828	Private	1,960	Bearcats	Great Lakes Valley (GLVC)
University of Nebraska-Lincoln	Lincoln, Nebraska	1869	Public	33,273	Cornhuskers	Big Ten (B1G)
Southwest Baptist University	Bolivar, Missouri	1878	Private	2,168	Bearcats	Great Lakes Valley (GLVC)
Spring Hill College	Mobile, Alabama	1830	Private	1,439	Badgers	Southern (SIAC)
Stevenson University	Stevenson, Maryland	1947	Private	3,621	Mustangs	MAC Commonwealth
Texas A&M University-Kingsville	Kingsville, Texas	1925	Public	8,783	Javelinas	Lone Star (LSC)
Vanguard University	Costa Mesa, California	1920	Private	2,752	Lions	Pacific West (PacWest)
Wayne State College	Wayne, Nebraska	1910	Public	4,202	Wildcats	Northern Sun (NSIC)

== Wrestling ==
=== Men ===
As of the most recent 2025-26 season, one school is a Division I independent in men's wrestling. Mercyhurst University began a transition from NCAA Division II to Division I in July 2024, joining the Northeast Conference (now officially called NEC). However, the NEC does not sponsor men's wrestling, and Mercyhurst has yet to announce a future affiliation for its program.

One program previously competed as an independent in the 2023-24 season. Morgan State University added a wrestling team for the 2023-24 season, becoming the only HBCU to field the sport at the Division I level. However, their primary conference, the Mid-Eastern Athletic Conference, does not sponsor the sport, so they competed as an independent in that sport only. In September 2024, however, it was announced that Morgan State would join the Eastern Intercollegiate Wrestling Association, a wrestling-only conference based in the Northeastern United States.

Institution	Location	Founded	Type	Enrollment	Nickname	Primary conference
Mercyhurst University	Erie, Pennsylvania	1926	Private	2,759	Lakers	Northeast (NEC)

=== Women ===
Women's wrestling was elevated from the NCAA Emerging Sports for Women program to full championship status in January 2025, with the first NCAA championship being held in spring 2026. Of the 113 schools that sponsored the sport in that season, only six were Division I members, and all competed as independents. One D-I member added the sport for the 2026-27 season, and will also compete as an independent.

Institution	Location	Founded	Type	Enrollment	Nickname	Primary conference
Delaware State University	Dover, Delaware	1891	Public (Note: Delaware State is officially chartered as a "privately governed, state-assisted" institution.)	6,200	Hornets	MEAC
University of Iowa	Iowa City, Iowa	1847	Public	30,042	Hawkeyes	Big Ten
Lehigh University	Bethlehem, Pennsylvania	1865	Private	5,451	Mountain Hawks	Patriot
Lindenwood University	St. Charles, Missouri	1827	Private	7,288	Lions	OVC
Mercyhurst University	Erie, Pennsylvania	1926	Private	2,759	Lakers	NEC
Presbyterian College	Clinton, South Carolina	1880	Private	1,330	Blue Hose	Big South
Sacred Heart University	Fairfield, Connecticut	1963	Private	5,974	Pioneers	Metro

== Sports with no independents other than full independents ==
=== Baseball ===
No schools will play as D-I independents in the 2027 spring season (2026-27 academic year). The only program to have been independent in the 2025 and 2026 seasons was Oregon State, which became a baseball independent after its home conference, the Pac-12, collapsed following the 2023-24 season. Pac-12 baseball will resume play in the 2027 season, with Oregon State joined by five new baseball-sponsoring full members and one new baseball affiliate.

=== Field hockey ===
No school is a Division I independent in the current 2026 field hockey season. The only independent in the 2025 season, Queens University of Charlotte, became a single-sport member of the Mountain Pacific Sports Federation in 2026.

=== Women's ice hockey ===
No women's ice hockey teams have played as independents at the National Collegiate level, the de facto equivalent to Division I in that sport, since the 2018-19 season. In that season, five schools - Franklin Pierce, Post, Sacred Heart, Saint Anselm, and Saint Michael's - competed as independents, all participating in the nascent New England Women's Hockey Alliance (NEWHA), which had originally been established in 2017 as a scheduling alliance among all of the then-current National Collegiate independents. The NEWHA initially included six schools, but Holy Cross left after the inaugural 2017-18 NEWHA season to join Hockey East. The NEWHA officially organized as a conference in advance of the 2018-19 season, but was not officially recognized by the NCAA as a Division I league until the 2019-20 season, by which time the newly launched LIU program had joined to return the conference membership to six.

=== Men's lacrosse ===
No schools have competed as independents since the 2024 season (2024-25 school year). The most recent men's lacrosse independent, Le Moyne, moved its program to the Northeast Conference (now officially known as NEC) following the 2024 season.

=== Women's lacrosse ===
In the 2027 season (2026-27 school year), no schools will compete as independents.

=== Men's soccer ===
No school is independent in the 2026 season. The only independent in the 2025 season was the University of Texas Rio Grande Valley, which played as such when the school's affiliate membership in the Western Athletic Conference (now known as the United Athletic Conference) was not renewed for that season. UTRGV joined the Ohio Valley Conference as a men's soccer affiliate beginning with the 2026 season.

=== Men's swimming & diving ===
No men's swimming & diving programs are independents in the 2026-27 season.

=== Women's swimming & diving ===
As in the case of men's swimming & diving, no women's programs in that sport are competing as independents in 2026-27.

== See also ==
- NCAA Division II independent schools
- NCAA Division III independent schools
