= Kohl Center =

Arena at the University of Wisconsin–Madison

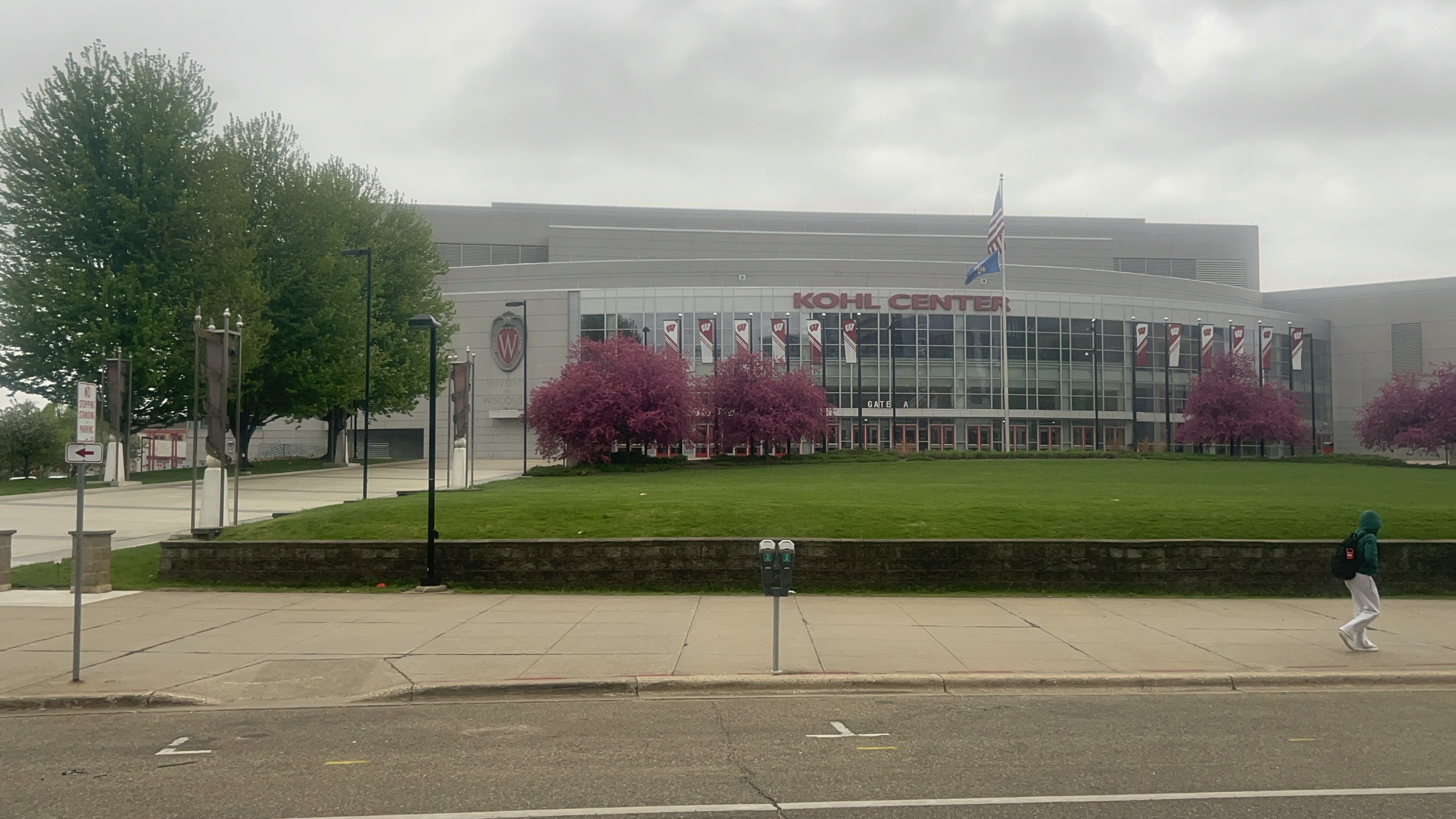
- Exterior view of the Kohl Center
- Interactive map of Kohl Center
- Location: 601 West Dayton Street; Madison, Wisconsin 53715-1206
- Coordinates: 43.069420°N 89.396972°W
- Owner: University of Wisconsin–Madison
- Operator: University of Wisconsin–Madison
- Capacity: 17,287 (basketball); 15,359 (ice hockey)
- Surface: Multi-surface; 200 by 85 feet (61 m × 26 m) (ice hockey)
- Public transit: Metro Transit

Construction
- Groundbreaking: September 7, 1996
- Built: October 8, 1996
- Opened: January 17, 1998
- Cost: $76.4 Million
- Architects: Venture Architects; HOK Sport; Heinlein Schrock Stearns
- Project manager: Hammes Company
- Structural engineer: Thornton Tomasetti
- Services engineers: M-E Engineers, Inc.
- General contractor: The Boldt Company

Tenants
- Wisconsin Badgers men's basketball (1998–present); Wisconsin Badgers women's basketball (1998–present); Wisconsin Badgers men's ice hockey (1998–present); Wisconsin Badgers women's ice hockey (1998–2012); WIAA boys basketball tournament (1998–present); WIAA girls basketball tournament (1998, 2001, 2003, 2005, 2010–2012); WIAA wrestling tournament (1998–present); NCAA men's basketball Midwest regional (2002); NCAA men's ice hockey Midwest regional (2008)

The Kohl Center is a multi-purpose arena located at the University of Wisconsin–Madison, United States. The arena opened in 1998 and is the home of the university's men's basketball and ice hockey teams, and the women's basketball team.

The Kohl Center has the fourth largest seating capacity in the Big Ten Conference with 17,287 for basketball and 15,539 for hockey. It is the second largest indoor venue in Wisconsin after Fiserv Forum in Milwaukee and is located at the intersection of West Dayton and North Frances Streets.

The arena is named after former United States Senator, former Milwaukee Bucks owner, and alumnus Herb Kohl, who donated $25 million of his Kohl's fortune to the project.

== Naming ==
In 1995 Herb Kohl donated $25 million to support the construction of the yet-unnamed arena. At the time it was the largest single donation in University of Wisconsin System history. Because of the donor's first name, it is sometimes locally referred to as the "Herb Garden". Former Wisconsin Badgers basketball player Albert Nicholas and his wife donated $10 million toward the project, with the adjoining practice pavilion named the Nicholas-Johnson Pavilion and Plaza; the basketball floor itself was renamed in his honor after he died in 2017. Jack F. Kellner and his sons donated an additional $2.5 million to the project. Wisconsin-based Hammes Company developed the arena for UW–Madison in 1993. The Boldt Company was the project's general contractor.

The Kohl Center boasts the nation's highest attendance in men's and women's college hockey.

== Student section ==
Originally known as "Mr. Bennett's Neighborhood" (for then-coach Dick Bennett) the student section of the Kohl Center adopted the name "Grateful Red" in 2002. The name was a reference to the rock group, the Grateful Dead, and members wore tie-dyed T-shirts as their pseudo-uniforms. The Detroit News ranked the section the #1 college basketball student section in February 2007. In 2018, the university renamed all student sections ”AreaRED”.

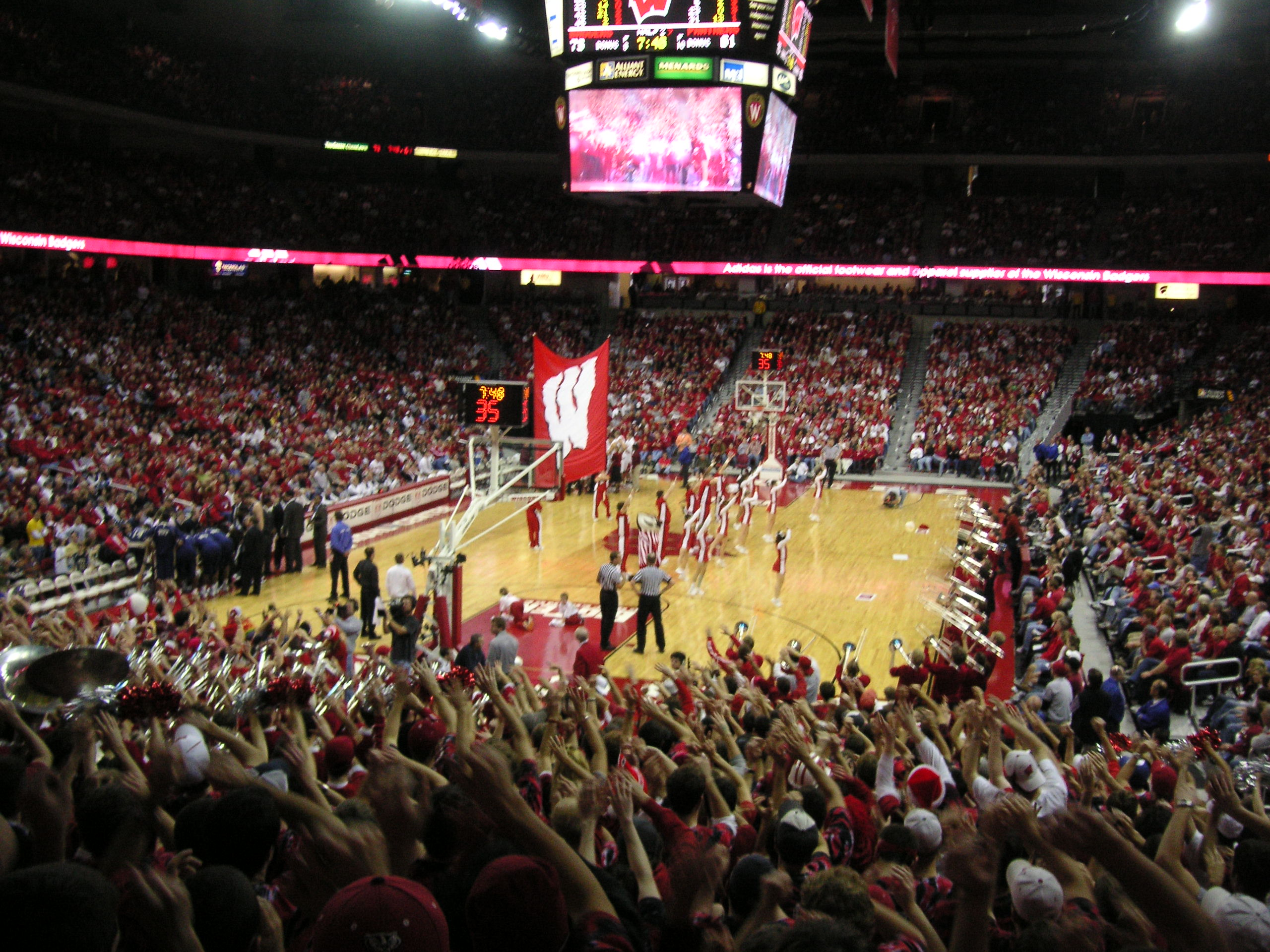
View from the Grateful Red student section

The student section holds 2,100 students and extends from the floor to the roof of the Kohl Center, a span of three decks. Under former coach Bo Ryan, the men's basketball team achieved a record of 133–10 at home and held a 24-game home winning streak through the 2006–07 season.

=== Court Storming Games ===
The Kohl Center has hosted several big games where a Badger victory led to fans storming the court:

- February 13, 2026: Wisconsin 92, (10) Michigan State 71
- November 15, 2024: Wisconsin 103, (9) Arizona 88
- December 2, 2023: Wisconsin 75, (3) Marquette 64
- March 1, 2022: (10) Wisconsin 70, (8) Purdue 67
- January 19, 2019: Wisconsin 64, (2) Michigan 54
- February 15, 2018: Wisconsin 57, (6) Purdue 51
- February 9, 2013: Wisconsin 65, (3) Michigan 62 (OT)
- February 12, 2011: (13) Wisconsin 71, (1) Ohio State 67
- December 2, 2009: Wisconsin 73, (6) Duke 69
- March 5, 2003: (24) Wisconsin 60, (14) Illinois 59
- February 27, 2002: Wisconsin 74, Michigan 54
- March 5, 2000: Wisconsin 56, (14) Indiana 53

== History ==
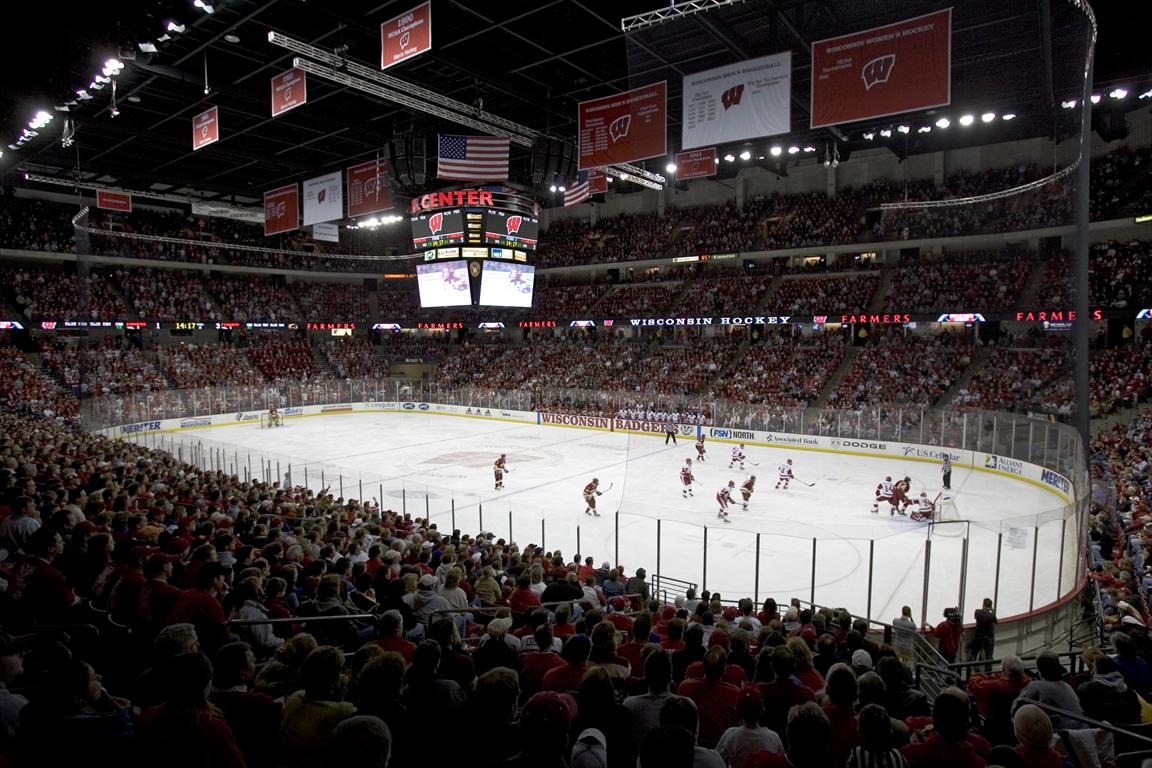
Men's hockey game at the Kohl Center

Prior to the Kohl Center, the basketball teams played at the Wisconsin Field House, while ice hockey was played at the Dane County Coliseum. The hockey teams still may play there if there is an event conflict, because basketball has scheduling priority. Originally, the overhead scoreboard from the UW Field House was installed in the Kohl Center because the cost of a new scoreboard unit wasn't included in the figure for the new arena. The old scoreboard remained in the Kohl Center for seven years, and after the money was raised, a new and modern circular unit was bought and installed before the 2004–2005 winter sports season. At the same time a LED ribbon board was installed, which surrounds the arena below the second balcony, displaying advertising, messages, and scores. The design of the Kohl Center is modeled somewhat after that of the Field House with cantilevered balconies instead of a setback style. This was done to intimidate opponents and bring all fans close to the action.

A bar and restaurant was added to the second level in 2005. The area is for pre-game gatherings of boosters who have made donations to the athletic department.

In 2006 a second student-athlete academic center was built on the lower level of the Kohl Center to provide student athletes easier access to academic services. Prior to the 2006 men's basketball season, the UW Athletic Department sold 48 courtside seats, at a price of $10,000 to $12,500 each. The available seats sold out, and a waiting list was created for the sale of seats that become available in the future. Space for the seats was created by eliminating part of the courtside seating for media. The addition of these seats has increased maximum capacity for men's basketball from 17,142 to 17,190.

Prior to the 2008–2009 season some of the seating in the upper deck was also reconfigured, adding more seating to the arena to bring capacity for men's basketball to 17,230.

The athletic department's master plan included adding a practice rink for ice hockey after construction of the Kohl Center. One configuration under consideration placed the rink next to the Nicholas Johnson Pavilion, where it would serve as an alternative practice facility for the men's hockey team and a game and practice facility for the women's hockey team. This was realized as LaBahn Arena, which opened in 2012.

The front entrance lobby features a wall sculpture from glass sculptor Dale Chihuly called "Mendota Wall".

== Other events ==
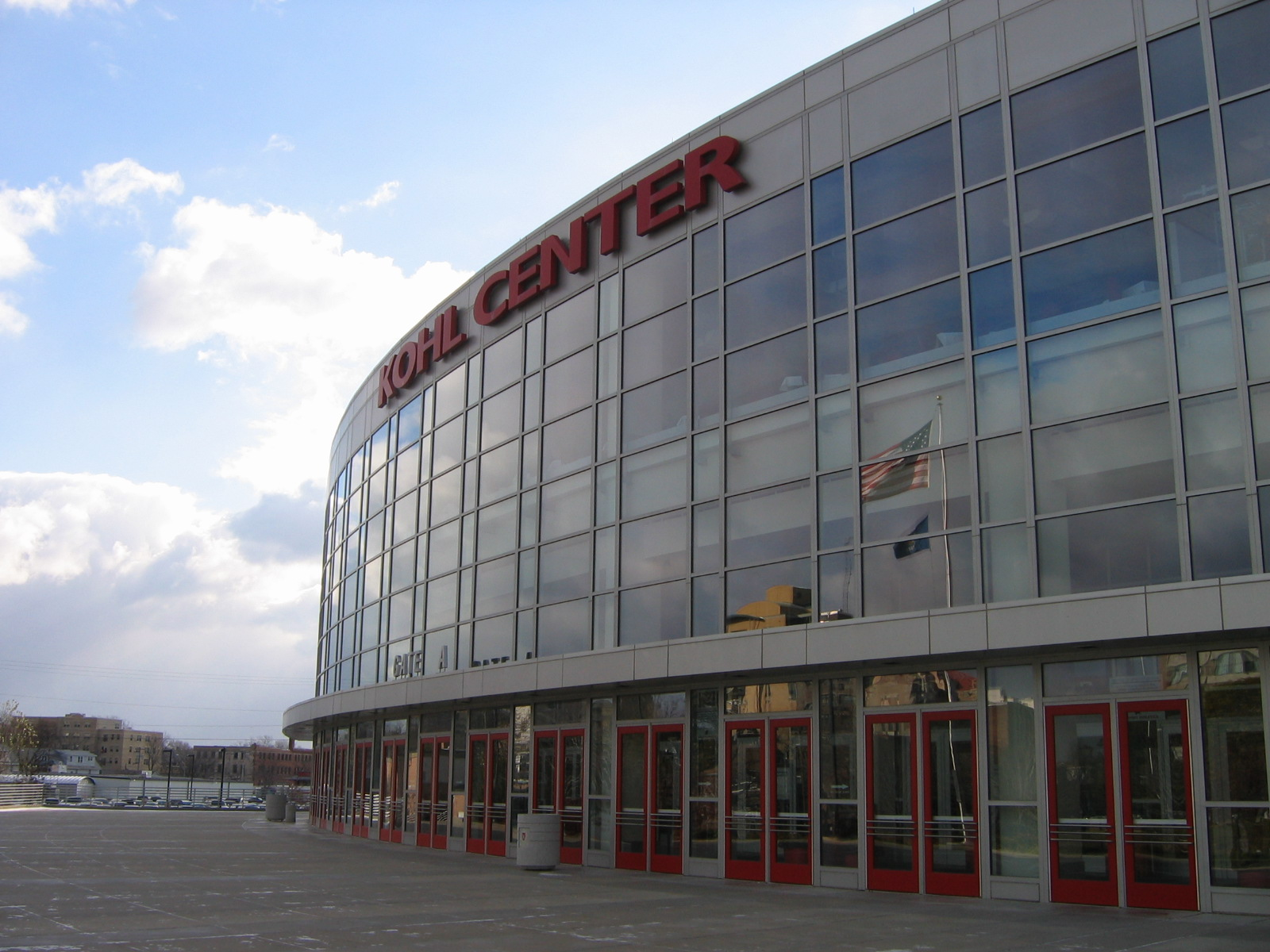
Front entrance

Other events are held at the Kohl Center, including commencement ceremonies for the UW, concerts, ice skating shows, career fairs, political gatherings, and conventions. The Kohl Center is the site of the Wisconsin Interscholastic Athletic Association (WIAA) high school Boys' basketball and individual wrestling championships. It has also hosted an NCAA women's volleyball national championship (Dec. 17–19, 1998), an NCAA men's basketball regional championship (March 22–24, 2002), and an NCAA men's hockey regional championship (March 28–30, 2008).

The Kohl Center also hosts the annual Varsity Band Spring Concert, an event that began in March 1975 and has grown into a three-night affair with professional staging, lighting, sound and pyrotechnics. The concert averages 25,000 attendees every year.

On February 12, 2008, Democratic presidential candidate Barack Obama spoke before a crowd of over 17,000 prior to the Wisconsin primary. The 2008 Jeopardy! College Championship was taped on April 11 and 12, 2008, at the Kohl Center.

The opening and closing ceremonies of the 2011 Science Olympiad National Tournament were held at the Kohl Center on May 20 and 21, 2011.

On October 8, 2016, the Milwaukee Bucks hosted a preseason game vs. the Dallas Mavericks at the Kohl Center.

On October 30, 2017, DJ Khaled hosted a concert at the Kohl Center after UW Student Sam Jeschke handed out 43,000 bottles of Mentos Gum.

Metallica kicked off their North American WorldWired Arena Tour on September 2, 2018, at the Kohl Center.

Mt. Joy and Goose performed a co-headlining concert on September 17, 2025, as part of Mt. Joy's Hope We Have Fun Tour, and Goose's Fall 2025 Tour.

Touring giant Dave Matthews Band played the Kohl Center on November 4, 2026. The show featured a guest performance from violinist Jake Renick Simpson.

== See also ==
- List of NCAA Division I basketball arenas
- List of NCAA Division I ice hockey arenas

Preceded by Galen Center	Host of the Jeopardy! College Championship; 2008	Succeeded by Sony Pictures Studios
