= Islanders Iceworks =

Ice hockey venue in Syosset, New York

- Interactive map of Islanders Iceworks
- Location: 175 Underhill Blvd; Syosset, New York, 11791
- Coordinates: 40°49′14.2″N 73°30′26.1″W
- Owner: New York Islanders
- Operator: New York Islanders
- Surface: (two) 200x85 feet (ice hockey)

Tenants
- New York Islanders; LIU Sharks men's ice hockey LIU Sharks women's ice hockey

Islanders Iceworks is a multipurpose ice hockey facility in Syosset, New York, containing two regulation-sized NHL rinks.

== Description ==
The facility is owned and operated by the New York Islanders, an NHL team, and is used primarily as a practice facility. Additionally the arena is available to the local community for a variety of reasons, including 'learning to skate', house leagues and summer camps.

== History ==
After founding both a men's and women's ice hockey team, Long Island University reached an agreement with the New York Islanders to use the Iceworks as their primary home rink.

The Islander's former owner Charles Wang purchased the Iceworks out of bankruptcy in 2015 for $8 million.

== See also ==
- Northwell Health Ice Center
