= Scheduling alliance =

A scheduling alliance is an agreement between collegiate athletic conferences or independent college athletic teams to guarantee a set number of games to each member of a team, or to create a competitive challenge between athletic conferences. Although it is not formally recognized by the governing body (usually the NCAA), it resembles a conference in many respects. The scheduling alliance may be very informal, only involving guaranteed games, or it may have awards, such as player of the week, MVP and a championship title. It can also involve a school agreeing to play a set number of games against members of a given conference in a particular sport, although not being a member of that league.

== FBS college football scheduling alliances ==
The most notable example of such an arrangement in FBS football involves the University of Notre Dame and the Atlantic Coast Conference. In 2013, Notre Dame joined the ACC as a full but non-football member, wishing to retain its status as an FBS independent in football. Notre Dame and the ACC agreed that in football, the Fighting Irish would play five games each season against other ACC schools, and also would play each ACC school at least once every three years. In 2020, however, due to the impact of the COVID-19 pandemic causing the Power Five conferences to enforce restrictions on non-conference play, the Fighting Irish played a full ACC schedule with eligibility for the ACC Championship Game, for which they qualified, ultimately losing to the Clemson Tigers.

In future years, due to the formation of the PAC-12-ACC-Big Ten Alliance, it has been rumored that the PAC-12 and Big Ten conferences could move from a 9-game conference schedule to an 8-game conference schedule, in order to create a 8-2 scheduling method that would allow members of this alliance to play at least 2 other teams from the 2 other conferences in the PAC-12-ACC-Big Ten alliance every season. Moreover, this is not the first time the Big Ten and PAC-12 have tried to create a scheduling alliance in football. In 2011, the Big Ten and PAC-12 conferences announced a scheduling alliance that was set to fully become the first conference challenge in football by the year 2017. While notable matchups were played as scheduled, including Oregon-Michigan State, California-Ohio State, and Michigan-Utah, the planned scheduling alliance that was to start in 2017 never happened after the Big Ten announced a move to a 9-game conference schedule starting in 2016.

== Division 1 college basketball scheduling alliances ==
In NCAA Division 1 men’s and women’s basketball, there are several prominent examples of scheduling alliances currently in place. These include the Big Ten-ACC challenge and the Big 12-SEC challenge. While these are the most well-known scheduling alliances in college basketball, other scheduling alliances in place include the SEC-American scheduling alliance, in which the 4 SEC teams that do not participate in the SEC-Big 12 challenge(due to the Big 12 only having 10 teams until the year 2023) play against teams from the American Athletic conference instead.

== Other collegiate examples ==
The COVID-19 pandemic impacted all college sports heavily, particularly on the scheduling side. Independent teams that lacked a conference found themselves on the outside looking in as many conferences had their members transition to a conference-only schedule for the season in the interest of safety. In college hockey, the two independent teams at the time, Arizona State and LIU, entered into scheduling alliances with the Big Ten Conference and Atlantic Hockey, respectively, in order to continue playing for the 2020-21 season. These alliances were disbanded the following year.

Another example is the New England Women's Hockey Alliance, which began in 2017 as a scheduling alliance between the six schools that then competed as independents at the National Collegiate level (in practice, NCAA Divisions I and II) in women's ice hockey. The NEWHA lost one member after its first season of 2017–18, but picked up a future sixth member in the form of a school that was set to launch a women's hockey program in 2019–20. Before the start of the 2018–19 season, the NEWHA formally organized as a conference and began the process of gaining official NCAA recognition. It operated with five members in 2018–19, and received NCAA recognition upon the arrival of the sixth member in 2019–20.
