= Tennessee State Tigers ice hockey =

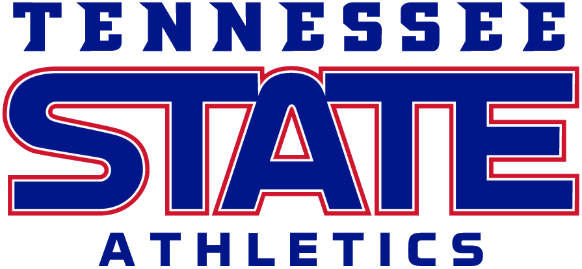
- University: Tennessee State University
- First season: TBD
- Head coach: Duanté Abercrombie
- Arena: Nashville, Tennessee
- Colors: Reflex blue and white

The Tennessee State Tigers ice hockey program is an upcoming college men's ice hockey team that will represent Tennessee State University. The program has faced numerous delays and set-backs, with the inaugural season being cancelled or postponed for three consecutive athletic seasons: 2024–25, 2025–26, and 2026–27. The program's current start date is undetermined.

== History ==
=== Founding ===
In 2021, Tennessee State University conducted a feasibility study on adding the sport of hockey, which came back positive. During the 2023 NHL Draft in Nashville, TSU officials announced plans to form a club hockey team that would begin play in 2024–25, with the intent of eventually achieving NCAA Division I status. This would see them become the first historically black college or university (HBCU) to offer men's ice hockey at any collegiate level. On January 20, 2024, 22-year old Toronto native Xavier Abel enrolled at the university to become the first player to commit to the team. A few months later, on April 16, 2024, TSU officially hired Duanté Abercrombie as the first head coach in school history. Previously, he was an assistant coach in the Toronto Maple Leafs organization and at Division III Stevenson University.

=== Financial Struggles ===
By mid-2024, plans began changing as TSU announced they would forgo playing as a club team for the 2024–25 season. Instead, they would take the 2024–25 season to prepare the program for fully launching as an NCAA Division I hockey team in the 2025–26 season. Following this announcement, Tennessee State University's continuing financial crisis began to affect the hockey team. At a TSU Board of Regents meeting in March 2025, it was announced that the hockey team would not be receiving any institutional funding, meaning that the program would have to be fully privately funded. Following this, Abercrombie began a donation drive to solicit enough funds, between $1.0 million to $2.5 million, for the team to begin as planned. By July 2025, it was apparent that the school would not be able to hit its funding goals in order to start for the 2025–26 season. TSU announced that it would be pushing its inaugural season to 2026–27. Following the delay to 2026–27, the NHL pledged $250,000 to TSU to help start the team. Additionally, the Nashville Predators pledged to help to program become a reality.

In early June 2026, TSU President Dwayne Tucker announced that the university was still working to acquire funds for the hockey program, wanting enough money to cover the team's expenses for the first five years or more. Tucker announced that TSU would make a decision on the team's future within 30 days, with Abercrombie stating that he remained hopeful the Predators and NHL would help to find a path forward for the team. A few weeks later, it was reported that the Tigers' inaugural 2026–27 season had been cancelled. This marked the third consecutive year that Tennessee State's inaugural season was cancelled or postponed.

== All-time coaching records ==
=== Club ===
| Tenure | Coach | Years | Record | Pct. |
|---|---|---|---|---|
| 2024– | Duanté Abercrombie | 0 | 0–0–0 | – |
| Totals | 1 coach | 0 seasons | 0–0–0 | – |

== See also ==
- Tennessee State Tigers and Lady Tigers
