= Saint Michael's Purple Knights women's ice hockey =

- University: Saint Michael's College
- Conference: NEWHA
- Head coach: Meghan Sweezey; 11th season, 5–63–0
- Assistant coaches: Leon Lifshitz; Olivia McLean; Kyra Yu
- Captain(s): Elisabeth Gerebi
- Alternate captain(s): Annika Lavender; Emersynn McGillis
- Arena: C. Douglas Cairns Recreation Arena; Colchester, Vermont
- Colors: Purple and gold

Conference tournament champions
- None

Conference regular season champions
- None

The Saint Michael's Purple Knights is the team that is a National Collegiate Athletic Association (NCAA) Division I college ice hockey program that represents Saint Michael's College. The Purple Knights, members of New England Women's Hockey Alliance (a founding member since 2018) play at the C. Douglas Cairns Recreation Arena in Colchester, Vermont.

== History ==
On June 17, 2024, former Saint Michael's player Meaghan Sweezey was named head coach. She replaced Chris Donovan, who had been a coach at Saint Michael's for 24 seasons. She won her first game as head coach on October 12, 2024 in a 1-0 win versus the Post Eagles. Freshman Julia Chedel recorded her first career goal for the game winning tally, while freshman goaltender Jordana DeMarinis made 34 saves for her first career win.

During the 2025-26 season, Saint Michael's logged only one win in 32 regular season games. The only win of the season occurred on October 11, 2025. Defeating the LIU Sharks in a 3-1 final, goaltender Annika Lavender made 52 saves. Maddie Quinn, Alicia McDonald and Brianna Jarvis contributed goals.

=== Season-by-season results ===
Won championship	Lost championship	Conference champions	League leader

Year	Coach	W	L	T	Finish	Conference Tournament	NCAA Tournament
2025–26	Meghan Sweezey	1	31	0	8th, NEWHA	Lost, First Round, vs Franklin Pierce (0-8, 1-5)	
2024–25	Meghan Sweezey	4	32	0	8th, NEWHA	Lost First Round vs LIU (0-4, 0-2)	
2023–24	Chris Donovan	0	35	1	8th, NEWHA	Lost First Round vs Saint Anselm (4-3, 0-8, 2-3 OT)	
2022–23	Chris Donovan	2	26	4	7th, NEWHA	Lost First Round vs LIU (2-3, 0-3)	
2021-22	Chris Donovan	3	23	1	6th, NEWHA		
2019-20	Chris Donovan	5	21	4	5th, NEWHA		
2018-19	Chris Donovan	7	17	1	4th, NEWHA		
2017–18	Chris Donovan	5	22	1	5th, NEWHA		

=== Team captains ===
- 2021-22: Jenna Harrison C, Courtney Kelly C, Ella Saracco C
- 2022-23: Jenna Harrison C, Mary Leys C, Mikaela Langbacka A
- 2023-24: Mikaela Langbacka C, Mary Leys C, Jace Zapata C
- 2024-25: Mary Leys C, Emersynn McGillis A, Gaby Tribelli A
- 2025-26: Elisabeth Gerebi C, Annika Lavender A, Emersynn McGillis A

== Awards and Honors ==
=== NEWHA Awards ===
- Victoria FitzGibbon, Annika Lavender and Maddie Quinn: 2024-25 NEWHA Student Athletes of the Year

=== NEWHA All-Rookie ===
- Jordana DeMarinis, 2025 NEWHA All-Rookie Team

=== NEWHA All-Stars ===
- Carissa Mudrak, 2023 NEWHA Second Team All-Star

=== NEWHA All-Sportswomanship ===
- Jordan Lettiere, 2023 NEWHA All-Sportswomanship Team
- Mary Leys, 2024 NEWHA All-Sportswomanship Team
- Alicia McDonald, 2025 NEWHA All-Sportswomanship Team
- Elisabeth Gerebi, 2026 NEWHA All-Sportswomanship Team
