= LIU Sharks women's ice hockey =

- University: Long Island University
- Conference: NEWHA
- Head coach: Kelly Nash; 5th season
- Arena: Islanders Iceworks; Northwell Health Ice Center; Brookville, New York
- Colors: Blue and Gold

NCAA tournament appearances
- 2023

Conference tournament champions
- 2020, 2023

Conference regular season champions
- 2023, 2024, 2025

The LIU Sharks women's ice hockey is the team that represents Long Island University in NCAA Division I ice hockey competition as a member of the New England Women's Hockey Alliance (NEWHA). They play their home games at Islanders Iceworks in Syosset, New York and Northwell Health Ice Center in East Meadow, New York.

== History ==
Long Island University announced the addition of women's ice hockey as a varsity sport in September 2018 along with the naming of Rob Morgan as the inaugural head coach. Soon after, the university announced a consolidation of the LIU Post Pioneers with the LIU Brooklyn Blackbirds to form one Division I athletic program at the university's Brooklyn campus. The current LIU program now competes as the LIU Sharks, with the new nickname having been selected by polling of alumni and students of the two campuses.

On September 26, 2018, LIU joined Division I Sacred Heart as well as Division II programs Franklin Pierce University, Post University, Saint Anselm College, and Saint Michael's College in the formation of the NEWHA conference. LIU becoming the sixth member of the organization allowed the NEWHA to transition from a scheduling affiliation to an NCAA hockey-only conference eligible for an autobid to the NCAA women's ice hockey tournament.

The team began competition in September 2019 to become the first, and only, women's NCAA ice hockey team on Long Island with 21 freshmen, one sophomore, and one junior. The Sharks played in their first exhibition game against the Metropolitan Riveters of the National Women's Hockey League on September 28. LIU's officially opened their inaugural season with the team's first NCAA games on October 4 and 5 versus the UConn Huskies, losing both contests by scores of 0-4 and 1–6. On October 19, 2019, LIU hosted top-ranked Wisconsin at Nassau Coliseum. LIU recorded its first victory on November 1, 2019 on the road at Saint Michael's with a 5–2 win; the game was also the Sharks' first conference game of the inaugural season. The Sharks finished the regular season 4th in the NEWHA with an 11–10–0 conference record. The Sharks upset top-seeded Sacred Heart in the semifinal round of the conference championship with a 3–0 win. In the NEWHA Championship game, the Sharks faced Saint Anselm in the Championship game after the Hawks defeated Franklin Pierce in a record-breaking five-overtime game. The Sharks scored the lone goal of the contest in the 2nd period then held on for 1–0 victory to earn the program's first conference tournament championship.

During the 2022–23 season, LIU posted an overall record of 20–13–3 and finished first in the conference with a record of 17–4–3. They won the NEWHA tournament to receive their first bid to the NCAA women's ice hockey tournament.

In 2024, Tindra Holm became the first player in conference history to win back-to-back NEWHA Goaltender of the Year Awards. During the 2023-24 season, the Sharks gained a program record 26 wins, highlighted by finishing the regular season on a 12 game winning streak.

== Season-by-season results ==
Won championship	Lost championship	Conference champions	League leader

Year	Coach	W	L	T	Conference	Conf. W	Conf. L	Conf. T	Finish	Conference Tournament	NCAA Tournament
2025-26	Kelly Nash	18	17	1	NEWHA	16	11	1	5th	Lost First Round vs Stonehill (0-3, 3-4 OT)	
2024-25	Kelly Nash	22	11	4	NEWHA	19	6	3	1st	Won First Round vs Saint Michael's (4-0, 2-0), Won Semifinals vs Post (2-0), Lost Finals vs Sacred Heart (2-4)	
2023-24	Kelly Nash	28	9	0	NEWHA	26	2	0	1st	Won First Round vs Saint Michael's (3-2, 3-0), Lost Semifinals vs Franklin Pierce (3-4 OT)	
2022–23	Kelly Nash	20	13	3	NEWHA	17	4	3	1st	Won Semifinals vs. Franklin Pierce (2–1) (OT); Won Championship vs. Saint Anselm (2–0)	Lost First Round vs. Wisconsin (1–9)
2021–22	Rob Morgan	17	15	3	NEWHA	15	3	2	2nd	Lost Semifinals vs. St. Anselm (1–3)	Ineligible
2020–21	Rob Morgan	5	8	0	NEWHA	—	—	—	—	Not held due to COVID-19 pandemic	Ineligible
2019–20	Rob Morgan	14	18	0	NEWHA	11	10	0	4th	Won Quarterfinals vs Saint Michael's (7–0); Won Semifinals vs. Sacred Heart (3–0); Won Championship vs. St. Anselm (1–0)	Ineligible

== Awards and Honors ==
=== NEWHA Awards ===
- Paula Bergström, 2023 NEWHA Defender of the Year
- Tindra Holm, 2023 NEWHA Goaltender of the Year
- Tindra Holm, 2024 NEWHA Goaltender of the Year
- Kelly Nash, 2025 NEWHA Coach of the Year

=== NEWHA Monthly Honors ===
- Grace Babington, NEWHA Player of the Month (January 2026)
- Addison Robillard, NEWHA Player of the Month (January 2026)
- Victoria Rutnik, NEWHA Goaltender of the Month (January 2026)

==== NEWHA All-Rookie ====
- Addison Robillard, 2026 NEWHA All-Rookie Team

==== NEWHA All-Stars ====
- Paula Bergström, 2023 NEWHA First Team All-Star
- Tindra Holm, 2023 NEWHA First Team All-Star
- Jeannie Wallner, 2023 NEWHA First Team All-Star
- Carrigan Umpherville, 2023 NEWHA Second Team All-Star
- Grace Babington, 2025 NEWHA First Team All-Star
- Anna Fairman, 2025 NEWHA First Team All-Stars
- Jeannie Wallner, 2025 NEWHA First Team All-Stars
- Grace Babington, 2026 NEWHA First Team All-Star

=== All-Sportswomanship ===
- Sarah Rourke, 2023 NEWHA All-Sportswomanship Team
- Sarah Rourke, 2024 NEWHA All-Sportswomanship Team
- Sam Mathe, 2025 NEWHA All-Sportswomanship Team
- Ryane Kearns, 2026 NEWHA All-Sportswomanship Team

=== NEWHA Postseason ===
- Grace Babington, 2025 NEWHA All-Tournament Team
- Maggie Culp, 2025 NEWHA All-Tournament Team

== Olympians ==
- Paula Bergström, 2022, Sweden

== See also ==
- LIU Sharks men's ice hockey
