= New England Women's Hockey Alliance =

US college women's ice hockey conference

- Association: NCAA
- Founded: 2018
- Commissioner: Robert M. DeGregorio, Jr. (since 2018)
- Sports fielded: Ice hockey
- Division: Division I
- No. of teams: 8 (7 in 2027)
- Headquarters: Winthrop, Massachusetts
- Region: New England, New York
- Website: newhaonline.com

The New England Women's Hockey Alliance (NEWHA) is a women's college ice hockey conference in the United States. It participates in the NCAA's Division I as a hockey-only conference. As of the most recent 2023–24 NCAA hockey season, the conference is made up of eight teams, with two each in Connecticut, Massachusetts, and New Hampshire, and one each in New York and Vermont.

== History ==
Prior to 2017, the women's ice hockey program at Sacred Heart University was a longstanding independent team, part of no conference. In that year, three NCAA Division II colleges and one Division I college (College of the Holy Cross) were removed from their NCAA Division III hockey conference (the New England Hockey Conference, formerly the ECAC East). Those teams had previously not been eligible for postseason play, but the conference no longer wanted Division I and II teams playing a conference schedule at all. A sixth team, from Post University, announced plans to start playing that year as well.

Sacred Heart, Post, and the other four programs (Holy Cross, St. Michael's, St. Anselm, and Franklin Pierce) then formed a scheduling alliance called the New England Women's Hockey Alliance. This was not a formal conference affiliation, just an agreement among the teams to schedule each other during the regular season; officially the teams would be classified as Division I or Division II independents. (NCAA women's ice hockey makes no distinction between Divisions I and II; the NCAA operates a single National Collegiate Championship for women's hockey that includes both Division I and Division II teams, and scholarship limits in that sport are identical in both divisions.)

Holy Cross intended to be independent only for one season, applying for and gaining membership in Hockey East effective 2018. In that year, the other NEWHA members announced plans to adhere to Division I recruiting rules and offer scholarships, and so applied to the NCAA for the NEWHA to be recognized as an official Division I conference. They also announced the conference would include Long Island University's team when it began play in 2019. NEWHA was approved as a Division I NCAA conference in September 2019. The conference will need to play at least two seasons with the same six members before being granted an automatic bid to the National Collegiate Championship playoffs in women's ice hockey.

The NEWHA expanded to seven members in 2022 with the arrival of Stonehill College, which started a varsity women's hockey team in the 2022–23 season. Stonehill had initially planned to start play in 2021–22, but NCAA-imposed recruiting limits imposed in the wake of COVID-19 led the school to delay the team's start by a year. The latest addition to the NEWHA is Assumption University, which joined for administrative purposes on July 1, 2022, in advance of its first season of varsity play in 2023–24.

On February 22, 2020, Saint Anselm and Franklin Pierce broke the record for longest NCAA women's hockey game with a five-overtime contest in the NEWHA Playoff Tournament that went 147:24. The game eclipsed the previous record of 144:32 in a 2010 game featuring RPI and Quinnipiac.

Beginning with 2023, the winner of the NEWHA Tournament earned an automatic bid to the NCAA women's ice hockey tournament.

On April 22, 2026, Saint Anselm announced that it would transition its athletic program from Division II to Division III after the 2026–27 school year. It will join the New England Women's and Men's Athletic Conference.

== Members ==
=== Current members ===
Departing member Saint Anselm in pink.

Institution	Location	Nickname	Founded	Affiliation	Enrollment	Joined	Men's hockey conference	Primary conference	Colors
Assumption University	Worcester, MA	Greyhounds	1904	Private (Catholic)	2,349	2023 (Note: Assumption joined for administrative purposes in 2022, but did not start NEWHA play until 2023.)	Northeast-10 (D-II)	Northeast-10 (D-II)	
Franklin Pierce University	Rindge, NH (Note: Franklin Pierce is located in New Hampshire, but plays its home hockey games in Winchendon, Massachusetts.)	Ravens	1962	Private (Nonsectarian)	2,381	2017	Northeast-10 (D-II)	Northeast-10 (D-II)	
Long Island University	Brooklyn/Brookville, NY	Sharks	1926	Private (Nonsectarian)	18,500	2019	Independent (Note: While LIU has been an independent since its first men's ice hockey season in 2020–21, it is a scheduling partner of Atlantic Hockey.)	Northeast Conference	
Post University	Waterbury, CT	Eagles	1890	Private (For-profit)	849	2017	Northeast-10 (D-II)	Central Atlantic Collegiate Conference (D-II)	
Sacred Heart University	Fairfield, CT	Pioneers	1963	Private (Catholic)	5,428	2017	Atlantic Hockey America	Metro Conference	
Saint Anselm College	Goffstown, NH	Hawks	1889	Private (Catholic)	2,015	2017	Northeast-10 (D-II) (TBD, D-III in 2027)	Northeast-10 (D-II) (NEWMAC, D-III in 2027)	
Saint Michael's College	Colchester, VT	Purple Knights	1904	Private (Catholic)	1,600	2017	Northeast-10 (D-II)	Northeast-10 (D-II)	
Stonehill College	Easton, MA	Skyhawks	1948	Private (Catholic)	2,500	2022	Independent	Northeast Conference	

New England Women's Hockey Alliance
Current NEWHA members: full member

=== Former member ===
Institution	Location	Founded	Type	Nickname	Joined	Left	Current Conference
College of the Holy Cross	Worcester, Massachusetts	1843	Private (Catholic)	Crusaders	2017	2018	Hockey East

== Champions ==
School	Tournament	Regular Season Champion	Tournament Champion	Notes
2017–18	2018	Saint Anselm (1)	Sacred Heart (1)	New England Women's Hockey Alliance founded by Franklin Pierce, Holy Cross, Post, Sacred Heart, Saint Anselm, and Saint Michael's. Final NEWHA season for Holy Cross, (leaving for Hockey East).
2018–19	2019	Saint Anselm (2)	Saint Anselm (1)	
2019–20	2020	Sacred Heart (1)	LIU (1)	LIU joins the NEWHA.
2020–21	2021	–	–	Season canceled due to COVID-19
2021–22	2022	Franklin Pierce (1); LIU (1)	Franklin Pierce (1)	
2022–23	2023	LIU (2)	LIU (2)	Stonehill joins the NEWHA.
2023–24	2024	LIU (3)	Stonehill (1)	Assumption joins the NEWHA.
2024–25	2025	LIU (4)	Sacred Heart (2)	
2025–26	2026	Franklin Pierce (2)	Franklin Pierce (2)	

== New England Women's Hockey Alliance tournament champions by school ==
School	Regular Season Championships	Tournament Championships
Franklin Pierce	2022, 2026	2022, 2026
Long Island	2022, 2023, 2024, 2025	2020, 2023
Sacred Heart	2020	2018, 2025
Saint Anselm	2018, 2019	2019
Stonehill		2024
Assumption		
Post		
Saint Michael's		

== National tournament history ==
Year	NEWHA Rep.	Opponent	Result
2023	LIU	Wisconsin	L 1–9
2024	Stonehill	Cornell	L 1–7
2025	Sacred Heart	Minnesota Duluth	L 1–6
2026	Franklin Pierce	Quinnipiac	L 0–4

== Conference arenas ==
School	Hockey Arena	Location	Capacity
Assumption	Worcester Ice Center	Worcester, MA	1,500
Franklin Pierce	Jason Ritchie Ice Arena	Winchendon, MA	500
LIU	Northwell Health Ice Center	East Meadow, NY	2,500
Post	Sports Center of Connecticut	Shelton, CT	—N/a
Sacred Heart	Martire Family Arena	Fairfield, CT	3,600
Saint Anselm	Thomas F. Sullivan Arena	Goffstown, NH	2,700
Saint Michael's	Cairns Arena	South Burlington, VT	600
Stonehill	Bridgewater Ice Arena	Bridgewater, MA	1,000

== See also ==
- NCAA women's ice hockey tournament (National Collegiate division)
