= College ice hockey =

US and Canadian amateur collegiate ice hockey competition

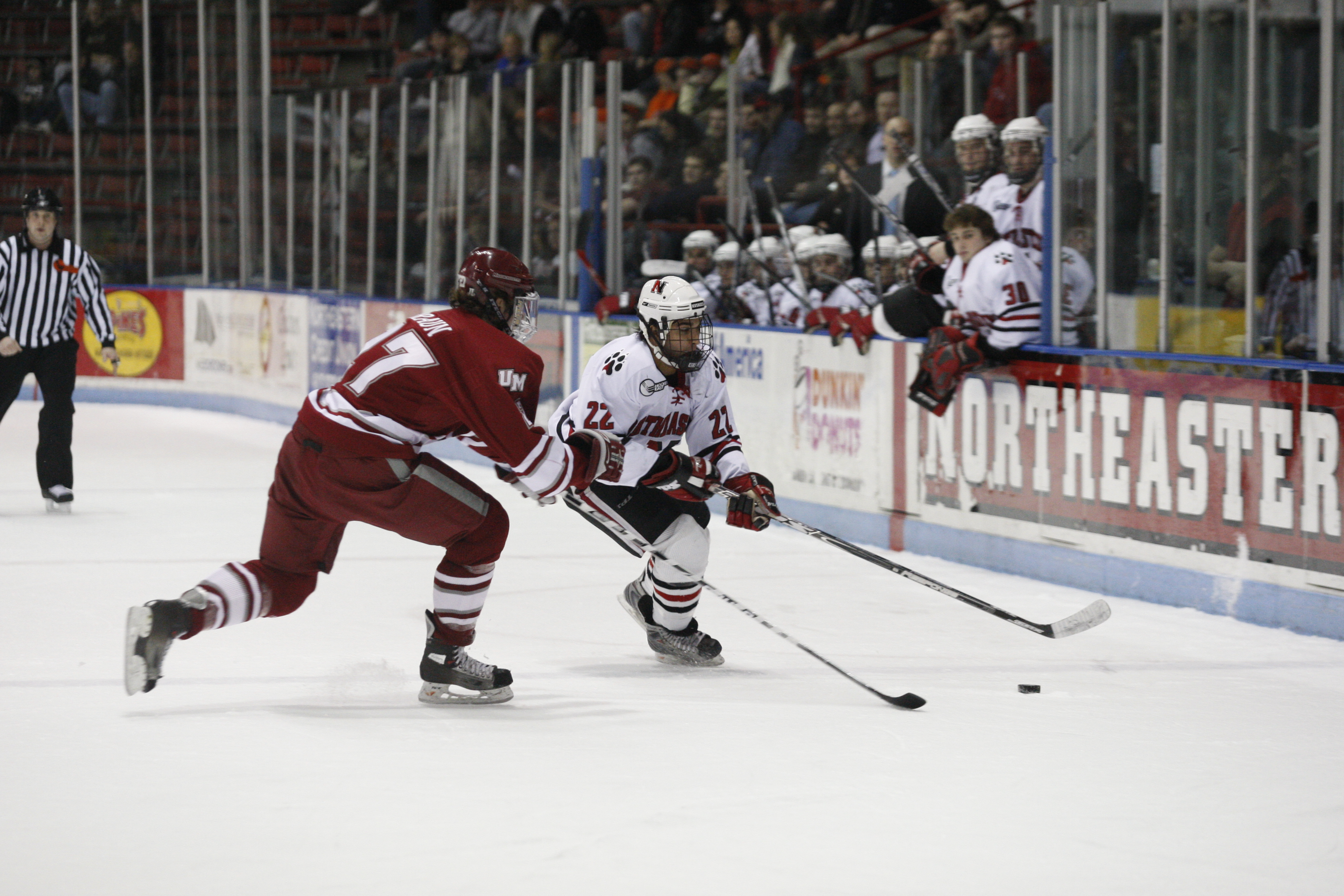
The Northeastern Huskies, a Hockey East league member, takes on the UMass Minutemen at Matthews Arena in Boston

College ice hockey is played principally in the United States and Canada, though leagues exist outside North America.

In the United States, competitive "college hockey" refers to ice hockey played between colleges and universities within the governance structure established by the National Collegiate Athletic Association (NCAA).

In Canada, the term "college hockey" refers to community college and small college ice hockey that currently consists of a varsity conference – the Alberta Colleges Athletics Conference (ACAC) – and a club league – the British Columbia Intercollegiate Hockey League (BCIHL). "University hockey" is the term used for hockey primarily played at four-year institutions; that level of the sport is governed by U Sports.

== History ==
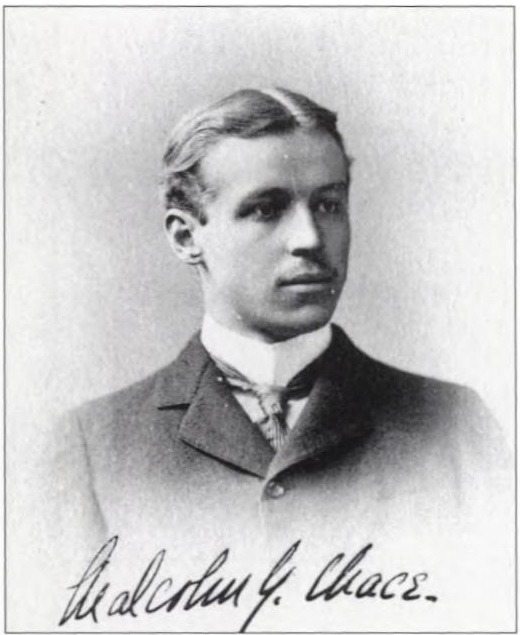
Malcolm Greene Chace

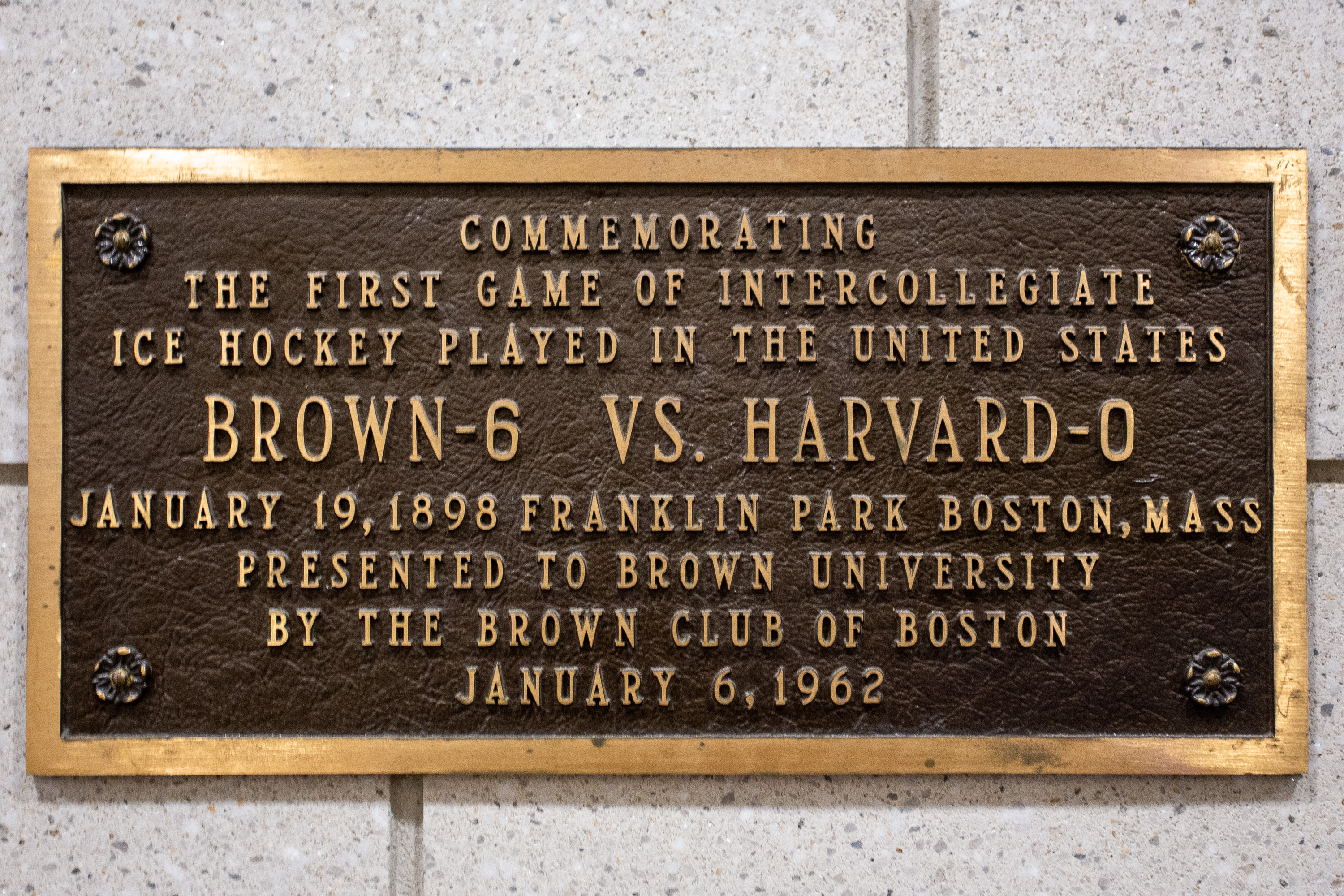
Plaque inside Meehan Auditorium at Brown University

In fall of 1892, Malcolm Greene Chace, then a freshman at Brown University, and Robert Wrenn, of Harvard University, were participating in a tennis tournament in Niagara Falls, Ontario. They both had dabbled a bit in a sport called ice polo; in Ontario, they met members of the Victoria Hockey Club, who introduced them to their similar game of ice hockey, and invited the two to visit Montreal to learn about their version of the game.

The next winter, during Christmas break 1894–1895, Chace (who had by then transferred to Yale University) and Wrenn returned to Canada with a group of college students from several universities. The cadre was one of the first American ice hockey teams and, after a 10-game tour of Canada, the students returned to their respective schools with the intent of founding collegiate ice hockey clubs.

Yale, where Chace served as team captain and player-coach, was the first of the group to organize its team and in February 1896 the Bulldogs played the first two intercollegiate ice hockey games against Johns Hopkins University. While Johns Hopkins' program would cease for 90 years after 1898, Yale has served as a bedrock of college hockey ever since, playing continually including through the Great Depression and two world wars. Yale's 125-year continuous streak was broken for the 2020-21 season, when all Ivy League winter sports were cancelled due to the COVID-19 pandemic.

Another game often cited as the "first game of intercollegiate ice hockey played in the United States" is a well-documented contest on January 19, 1898, at Franklin Park, Boston. Students from Brown took the train to Boston, where they commandeered a patch of a frozen pond in Franklin Park, asked pleasure skaters to give them room, and played students from Harvard. The details and outcome of the game were recorded in the following day's Boston Herald: Brown 6, Harvard 0.

Within ten years all eight schools that would eventually comprise the Ivy League had played their first game as well as several other nearby teams. A lack of available ice was the primary concern for most schools as to whether they should start a program or continue supporting an existing team but that did not detract from the enthusiasm of the students.

=== Early style of play ===
For at least the first 25 years of intercollegiate play the teams used a 7-on-7 format, a typical setup for turn of the century ice hockey. On a faceoff players were typically arranged as either four forwards, two point men and one goaltender or three forwards, one rover, two point men and one goaltender.

In the four forward setup the players were arranged from a faceoff as a left and right wing (or end) on the outside and a left and right center on the inside. The two point men and goaltender were typically arrayed in a line from center ice to the goal as cover point, point and goaltender. If viewed from above, the players would form a T.

If a rover was used instead there would only be one center. The rover would line up either in a defensive or offensive position depending on the need. The remaining five positions would be unchanged. By the 1921–22 season college hockey adopted the increasingly more common six–a–side format with the abandonment of the second center/rover position and the two point men being renamed as 'defensemen'. The change from point men to defensemen came as a result of an alignment change where instead of lining up one in front of the other, the two defensive players would play beside one another.

The ice surfaces that the players played on were not of a uniform size. Rinks like the St. Nicholas Rink or Duquesne Gardens were few and far between and quite often teams would only be able to play on frozen ponds. Slightly more consistent were the length of games, however, there was no set game time. Most were played as two 20-minute halves but some games had 15- or 25-minute halves and others were one 40-minute period. Occasionally games were not able to be played entirely at one time so the teams would arrange to meet at a later date to finish the match. Overtime after a tie did not always occur, as ice times at public skating rinks were constrained, but even when teams were able to play extra frames the rules were somewhat flexible; because there were no lights illuminating the ponds, games could only be played while the sun was shining and in the winter months dusk came quickly. The teams would attempt to finish the game with a winner decided but even after multiple overtimes ties did result.

=== Stabilizing the game ===
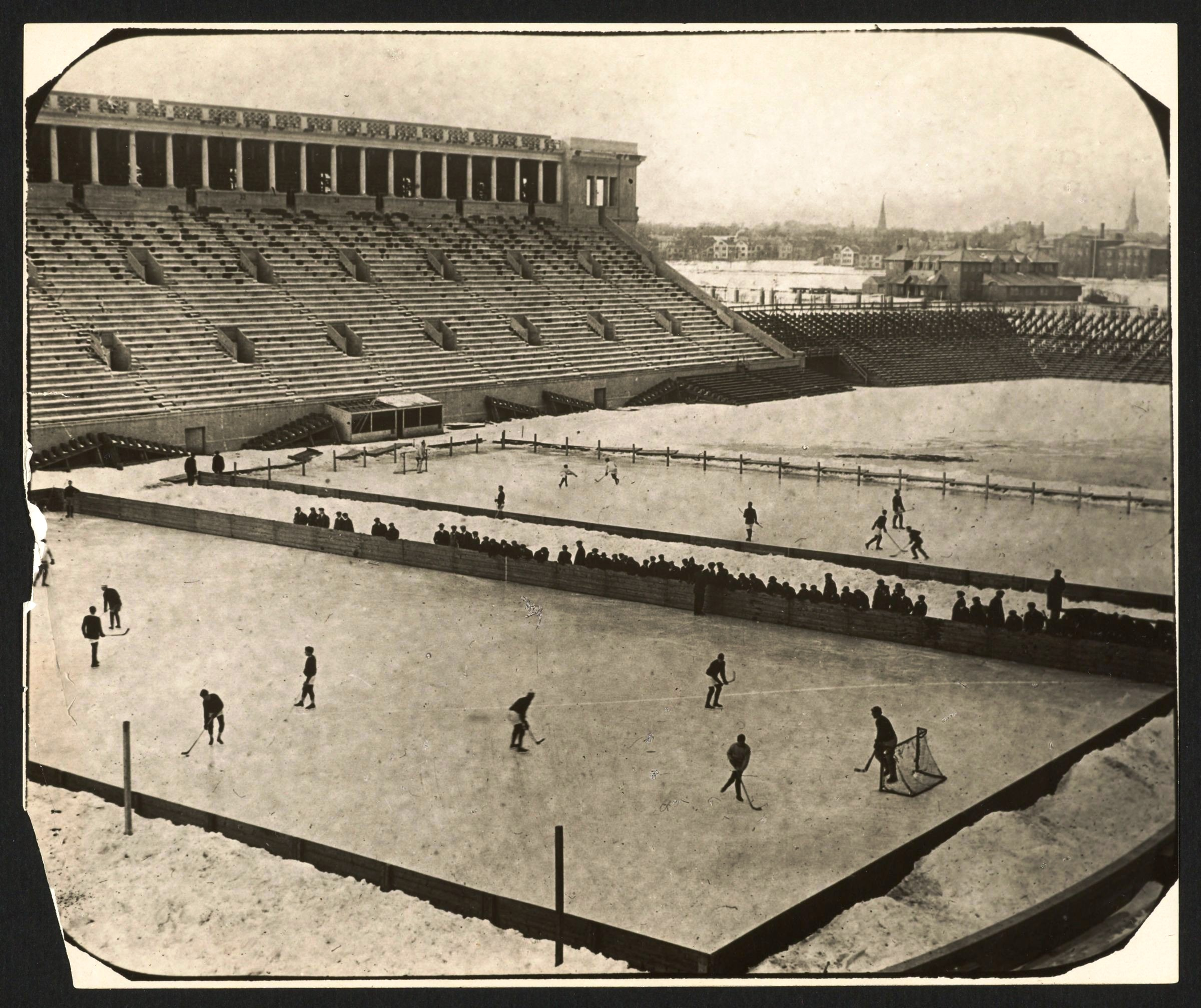
The two ice hockey rinks at Harvard Stadium

From the start college hockey teams were rarely in a place of surety. In the 10 years since Johns Hopkins University's exit in 1898 at least a dozen teams were forced to cancel seasons or suspend their program entirely, including some of the more financially sound institutions like Cornell University and Brown University. The two main factors in this were interest from the student body and the lack of available or good ice. While the interest conundrum required a more nuanced solution, the ice troubles had a more tangible answer. Teams near to public skating rinks would be able to hold their games at venues where ice conditions could be ensured but at the start, with so few available, some programs came up with novel solutions. One such idea came from Harvard University who, after completing construction of their football stadium in 1904, decided to erect two open-air rinks on the field for the team to use.

As rinks continued to be built in areas near to the colleges, specifically the Boston Arena, New Haven Arena and Philadelphia Ice Palace, college teams had more and more ice rinks available to them and with most using artificial ice the teams were no longer dependent on weather conditions. Owing to the popularity of the game the first on-campus, purpose-built arena was constructed by Princeton University in 1923. Most schools were content with buying ice time from local rink operators while others simply didn't want to fund the building of their own version of the Hobey Baker Memorial Rink. As the weather warmed in the 1930s and 40s many of these teams would be forced to decide whether they were willing to financially support their ice hockey programs or not. Army, for instance, had Smith Rink built in 1930 while Cornell struggled with the ice on Beebe Lake until after World War II.

=== World War I aftermath ===
The vast majority of teams ceased operating in 1917 after the United States entered World War I. This made sense as many of the students who would otherwise have been playing had instead joined the military. Because the war ended in November 1918 many of the teams returned to the ice for the 1918–19 season and, while the game continued to grow around New England, an interesting development happened shortly after the armistice was signed.

Colleges in the midwest began their own ice hockey programs. At the beginning these were typically restricted to upper-echelon universities like the University of Minnesota or the University of Michigan but some of the smaller schools got into the game as well. From the MIAC's foundation in 1920, member schools have played ice hockey and were able to establish the first consistent lower-tier competition in college hockey.

=== Great Depression ===
While college ice hockey flourished in the 1920s the Great Depression did have an impact on the game in the '30s. Most schools that had established programs made the effort to keep their teams going but some less-acclaimed teams like Pennsylvania or Columbia decided that ice hockey wasn't worth the cost. Some of the smaller schools like Rensselaer had no choice but to suspend their programs as they did not have the resources that a Harvard or Yale did. After the first half of the 1930s, however, the depression lessened and schools were able to found or restart their programs. The game continued to expand west with the addition of Gonzaga, USC, UCLA and others, however, none of the Pacific-coast teams would make it to the 1950s.

=== World War II hiatus ===
As was the case during World War I, the majority of universities suspended their ice hockey teams during World War II. Most of teams that were active just prior to the U.S.' entry played during the 1942–43 season but were mothballed afterwards. There were notable exceptions such as Yale and Dartmouth, who continued to play through the duration of the war, but many teams returned to the ice for an abbreviated 1945–46 season. One benefit to college hockey that resulted from the war was the G.I. Bill which helped returning servicemen pay for a college education. With a much larger student body and a resulting influx in cash, colleges were more able to afford to support an ice hockey team.

=== NCAA tournament ===
By 1947, college ice hockey was still a regional sport, being localized in the northeast and northern Midwest (with a few exceptions) but despite the low number of teams playing, the NCAA finally instituted a national tournament. At the start the tournament invited two participants from the two regions: east and west. The east region was loosely defined as any college east of the Pennsylvania-Ohio border with all other teams being lumped into the west region. The tournament was held at the Broadmoor World Arena for the first ten years. Partially due to a lack of competition, Michigan was invited to participate in each of the first ten tournaments and won six National Championships in that time.

== NCAA ==
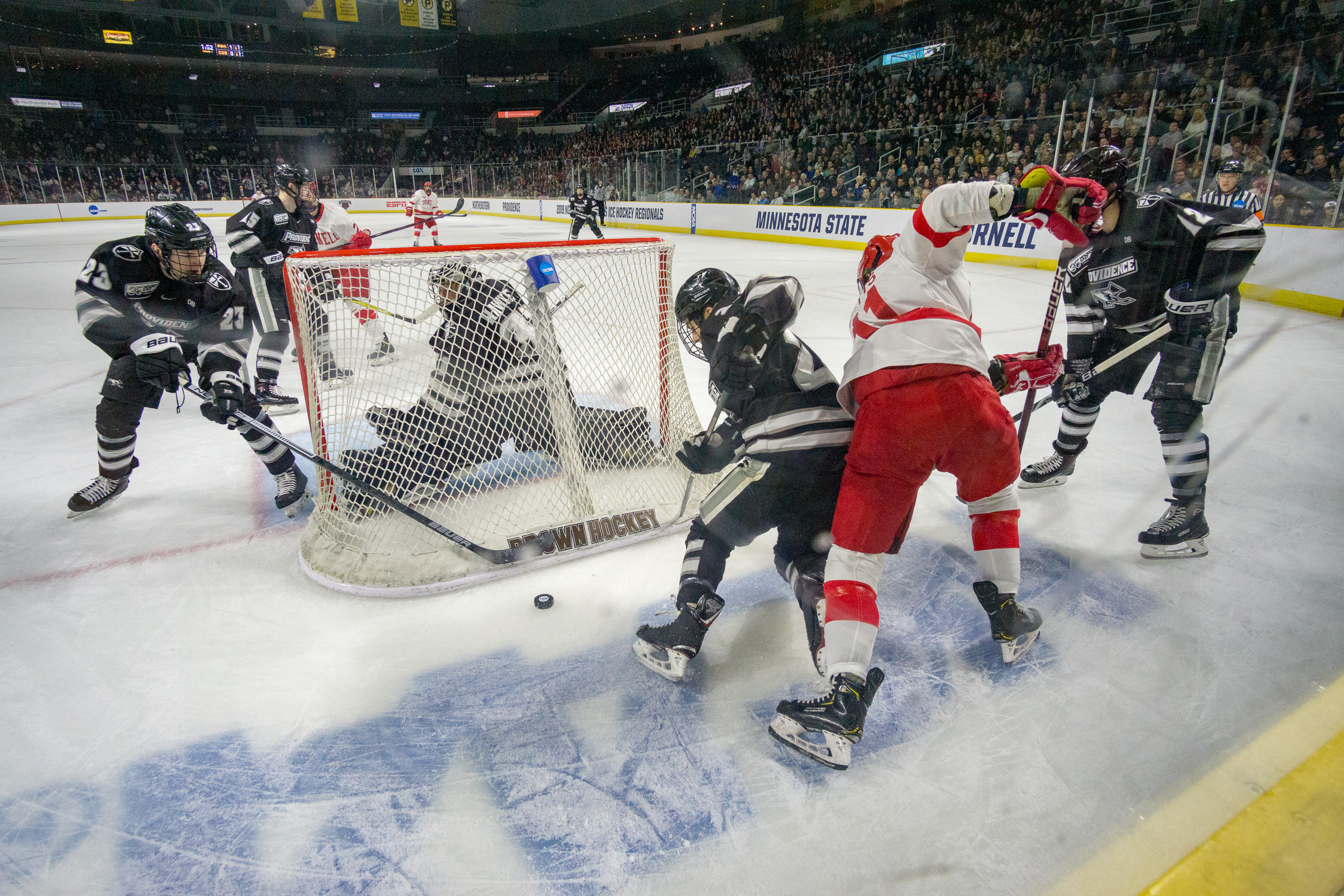
Providence College Friars play Cornell in the NCAA Regional at the Dunkin' Donuts Center in April 2019

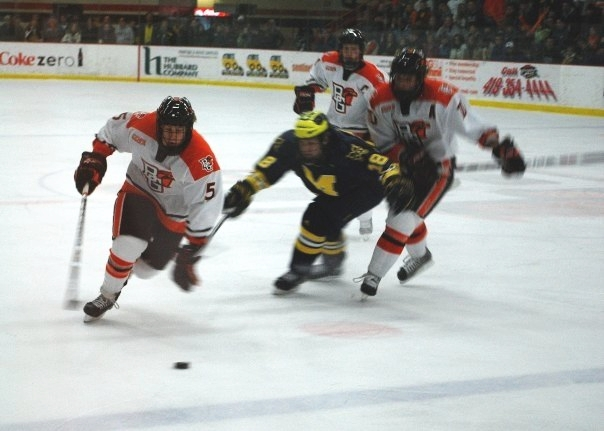
Bowling Green playing Michigan

The National Collegiate Athletic Association has conducted national championships for men's ice hockey since 1948, and women's ice hockey since 2001.

U.S. college hockey players must be deemed eligible for NCAA competition by the NCAA Eligibility Center, a process that examines a student-athlete's academic qualifications and amateur status. Players who have played in the Canadian Hockey League (CHL) historically were considered to be professionals and therefore ineligible. In 2024 the NCAA changed its position and decided that CHL players were no longer ineligible as of the 2025–26 season. The decision was made after a class action was filed on behalf of a player who was declared ineligible after having played two exhibition games in the OHL when he was 16 years old.

Men's U.S. college hockey is a feeder system to the National Hockey League. As of the 2010–11 season, 30 percent of NHL players (a total of 294) had U.S. college hockey experience prior to turning professional, an increase of 35 percent from the previous 10 years. That percentage has been maintained the past three seasons, with a record 301 NHL players coming from college hockey in 2011–12.

=== Men ===
One hundred thirty-eight colleges and universities sponsor men's ice hockey in the NCAA's three divisions.

==== Division I ====
NCAA Division I had 63 men's ice hockey teams in the 2025–26 season. One of these teams was shut down after that season, while one team will be added in both 2026–27 and 2027–28. Of the schools that played in 2025–26, 19 are Division II or III athletic programs that "play up" to Division I in hockey, and 16 of the full Division I members are in the Football Bowl Subdivision. Seven of the FBS schools compete in the Big Ten Conference; six are full conference members and the seventh is a single-sport member.

The NCAA Division I Championship is a 16-team, single-elimination tournament, divided into four, 4-team regional tournaments. The winner of each regional advances to the Frozen Four to compete for the national championship. For many years, 5 teams earned automatic bids through winning conference tournament championships, while 11 earned at-large berths through a selection committee. With the addition of the Big Ten hockey conference for the 2013–14 season, the tournament now features 6 automatic qualifiers, and 10 at-large bids. Through 2024–25, the NCAA used the PairWise Rankings, which use a number of ranking factors to create a scoring system for all NCAA Division I teams, to determine at-large teams. Starting in 2025–26, the NCAA replaced PairWise with a new in-house metric, the NCAA Percentage Index (NPI).

A map of all NCAA Division I men's hockey teams as of 2024.

As of the 2025–26 season, the conferences are:

- Atlantic Hockey America
- Big Ten Conference
- Central Collegiate Hockey Association
- ECAC Hockey
- Hockey East Association
- National Collegiate Hockey Conference

The most recent change to the lineup of Division I men's hockey conferences was the creation of Atlantic Hockey America shortly after the 2023–24 season. It was formed by the merger of the men-only Atlantic Hockey Association and the women-only College Hockey America.

The CCHA, the revival of a league that had operated from 1971 to 2013 before folding in the aftermath of major conference realignment, initially consisted of seven schools that had previously competed in the Western Collegiate Hockey Association. These schools had announced in late 2019 that they would leave the WCHA after the 2020–21 season, and subsequently announced that they would operate as a new CCHA. Following the CCHA's revival, the WCHA folded its men's division.

The Ivy League recognizes ice hockey champions for both sexes, but it does not sponsor the sport; it instead uses the results of regular-season ECAC Hockey matches involving two Ivy League schools to extrapolate an Ivy champion (all six Ivy League schools that sponsor varsity hockey do so for both men and women, and compete in the ECAC). The Metro Atlantic Athletic Conference sponsored D-I men's hockey, but dropped the sport in 2003.

The Hobey Baker Memorial Award honors the top player in men's Division I hockey. The Mike Richter Award honors the top goaltender in Division I.

==== Division II ====
The NCAA does not currently sponsor a championship in NCAA Division II, as there is only one conference that currently sponsors hockey, the Northeast-10 Conference. The NCAA conducted a Division II national championship from 1978 to 1984 and also from 1993 to 1999.

==== Division III ====
The 91 programs in Division III hockey are part of 10 conferences:

- Conference of New England
- Little East Conference
- Massachusetts State College Athletic Conference
- Middle Atlantic Conference
- Minnesota Intercollegiate Athletic Conference
- New England Small College Athletic Conference
- Northern Collegiate Hockey Association
- State University of New York Athletic Conference
- United Collegiate Hockey Conference
- Wisconsin Intercollegiate Athletic Conference

Misericordia announced that they would begin sponsoring men's ice hockey in 2024. The addition gave the MAC enough member teams to qualify for an automatic bid so the conference formally announced the addition of men's ice hockey as a sponsored sport. As part of a larger realignment within college hockey, both Neumann University and Wilkes joined the MAC as affiliate members in ice hockey only. Those additions then gave the conference sufficient women's hockey teams for an auto bid and the conference. Both the men's and women's ice hockey divisions officially began with the 2024–25 season.

The NCAA has conducted a Division III national championship since 1984. The current championship format is a 12-team (formerly 11-team), single-elimination bracket.

=== Women ===
A map of all NCAA Division I women's hockey teams.

There are 108 colleges and universities that sponsor women's ice hockey in two divisions: National Collegiate and Division III.

==== National Collegiate ====
As of the most recent 2025–26 season, 45 teams competed in the National Collegiate division (commonly referred to as Division I). All of them play in one of five conferences:

- Atlantic Hockey America
- ECAC Hockey
- Hockey East Association
- New England Women's Hockey Alliance
- Western Collegiate Hockey Association

The WCHA remains in operation as a women's league despite the demise of the conference's men's side.

As noted in the Division I men's section, Atlantic Hockey America was formed by the 2024 merger of the women-only College Hockey America and the men-only Atlantic Hockey Association.

The National Collegiate championship is an 11-team, single-elimination tournament to determine the national champion.

The Patty Kazmaier Memorial Award is awarded annually by USA Hockey to the top player in women's Division I hockey.

The most recent school to start National Collegiate play is Delaware, which launched its National Collegiate program in the 2025–26 season. When announcing the addition of women's ice hockey, Delaware stated that it would join College Hockey America, but CHA had already announced its planned merger with the Atlantic Hockey Association. Delaware's future CHA membership accordingly transferred to Atlantic Hockey America. Before Delaware, the most recent school to start National Collegiate play was Assumption, which started varsity play in 2023–24 as the newest member of the NEWHA, having joined for administrative purposes a year earlier. Also, as noted previously, Tennessee State has plans to add women's hockey, although it did not set a timeline.

Robert Morris resumed National Collegiate play in 2023–24, returning to CHA after having dropped men's and women's hockey following the 2020–21 season. Both teams are now in the merged Atlantic Hockey America.

The newest National Collegiate conference is the NEWHA, formed in 2017 as a scheduling alliance between the then-current National Collegiate independents. It formally organized as a conference in 2018 and received NCAA recognition in 2019.

==== Division III ====
There are 79 teams in Division III in 11 conferences:

- Conference of New England
- Little East Conference
- Massachusetts State College Athletic Conference
- Middle Atlantic Conference
- Minnesota Intercollegiate Athletic Conference
- New England Small College Athletic Conference
- Northern Collegiate Hockey Association
- State University of New York Athletic Conference
- United Collegiate Hockey Conference
- Wisconsin Intercollegiate Athletic Conference

The Division III championship is a 13-team, single-elimination tournament to determine the national champion.

== U Sports ==
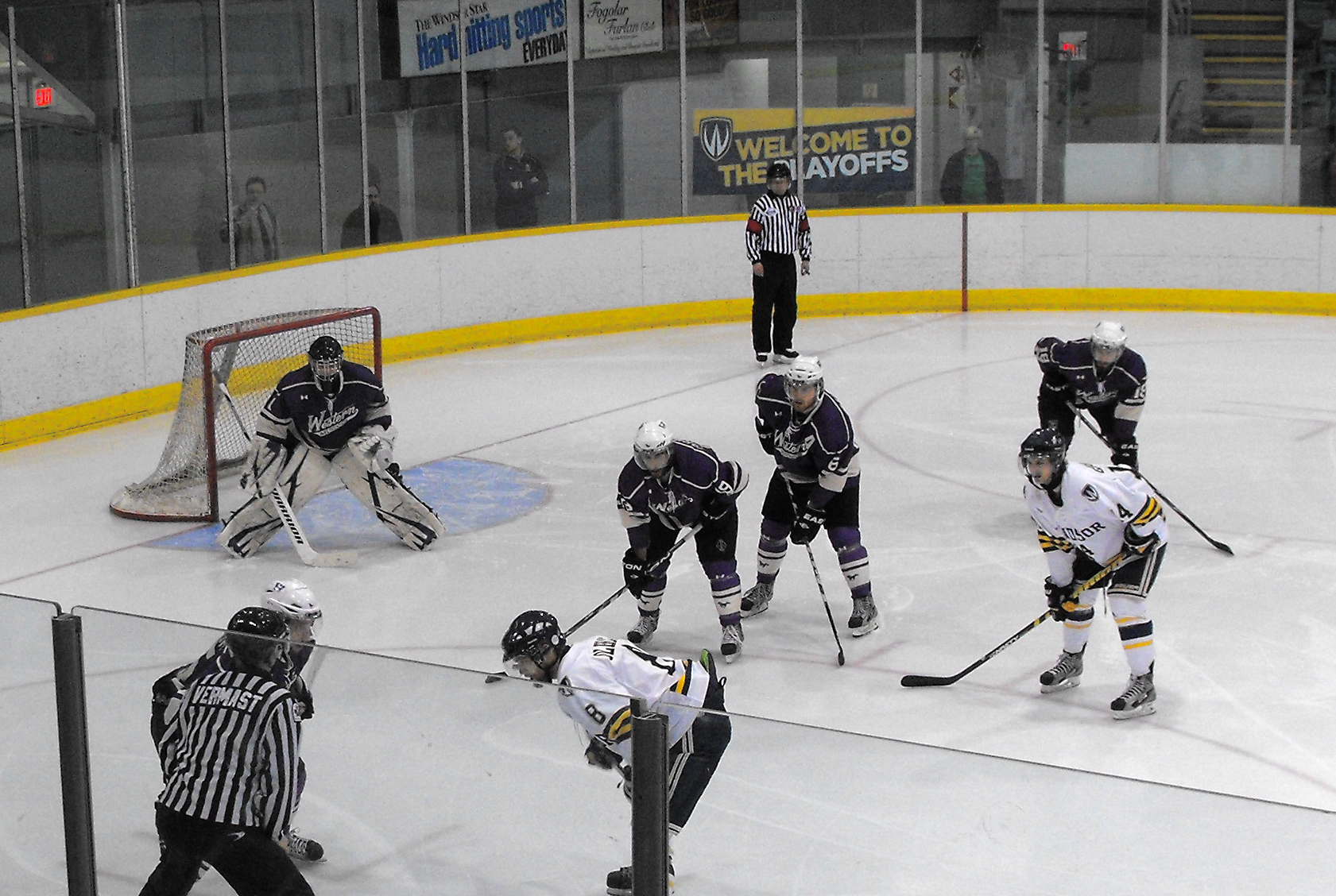
Windsor Lancers and Western Mustangs during 2013 CIS, now U Sports playoffs

University hockey teams in Canada compete in leagues as part of U Sports, the national governing body for Canadian university athletics (in Canadian English, the term "college" is reserved for schools that would be called "junior", "community", or "technical" colleges in the U.S.). U Sports sponsors both men's and women's hockey.

Like in the United States, teams compete in athletic conferences based on geographical locations of the schools. Unlike the NCAA, U Sports does not award players with athletic scholarships, resulting in a lack of divisional separation such as found between NCAA divisions. Individual conferences hold postseason tournaments, followed by the round-robin U Sports championship tournament in late March.

== NAIA ==
In 2015, a group of member schools in the National Association of Intercollegiate Athletics (NAIA) began working to add the sport to the organization. The NAIA originally sponsored a men's ice hockey championship from 1968 to 1984 when it was discontinued due to many of the schools with teams leaving the NAIA for the NCAA. A few NAIA schools continued to sponsor the sport as varsity-club teams in the ACHA. A growing number of schools have added ice hockey as members of the ACHA over the past 5–10 years. In 2016, several NAIA institutions that sponsor men's ice hockey teams announced the formation of a coaches association and a new division for NAIA ice hockey program to begin play during the 2017–18 season. In 2017, The Wolverine-Hoosier Athletic Conference (WHAC) became the first current conference in the NAIA to offer the sport and host a conference championship.

== ACHA ==
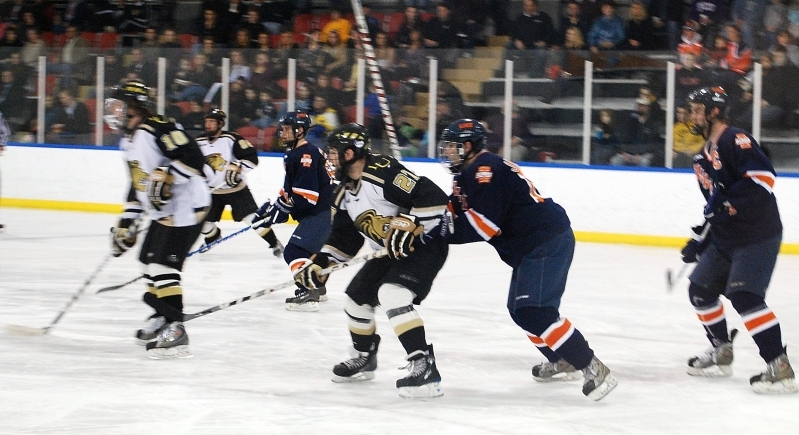
Lindenwood University vs. University of Illinois

The American Collegiate Hockey Association (ACHA) is the sanctioning body for non-NCAA or "club" ice hockey in the United States. The organization provides structure, regulations and promotes the quality of collegiate ice hockey.

Teams separated into three men's and two women's divisions with over 300 teams from across the United States. The recruiting process, rules and regulations, and player eligibility standards parallel that of NCAA Division III. Sometimes, ACHA and NCAA will play games against each other to complete each of their season schedules.

== Outdoor games in the 21st century ==
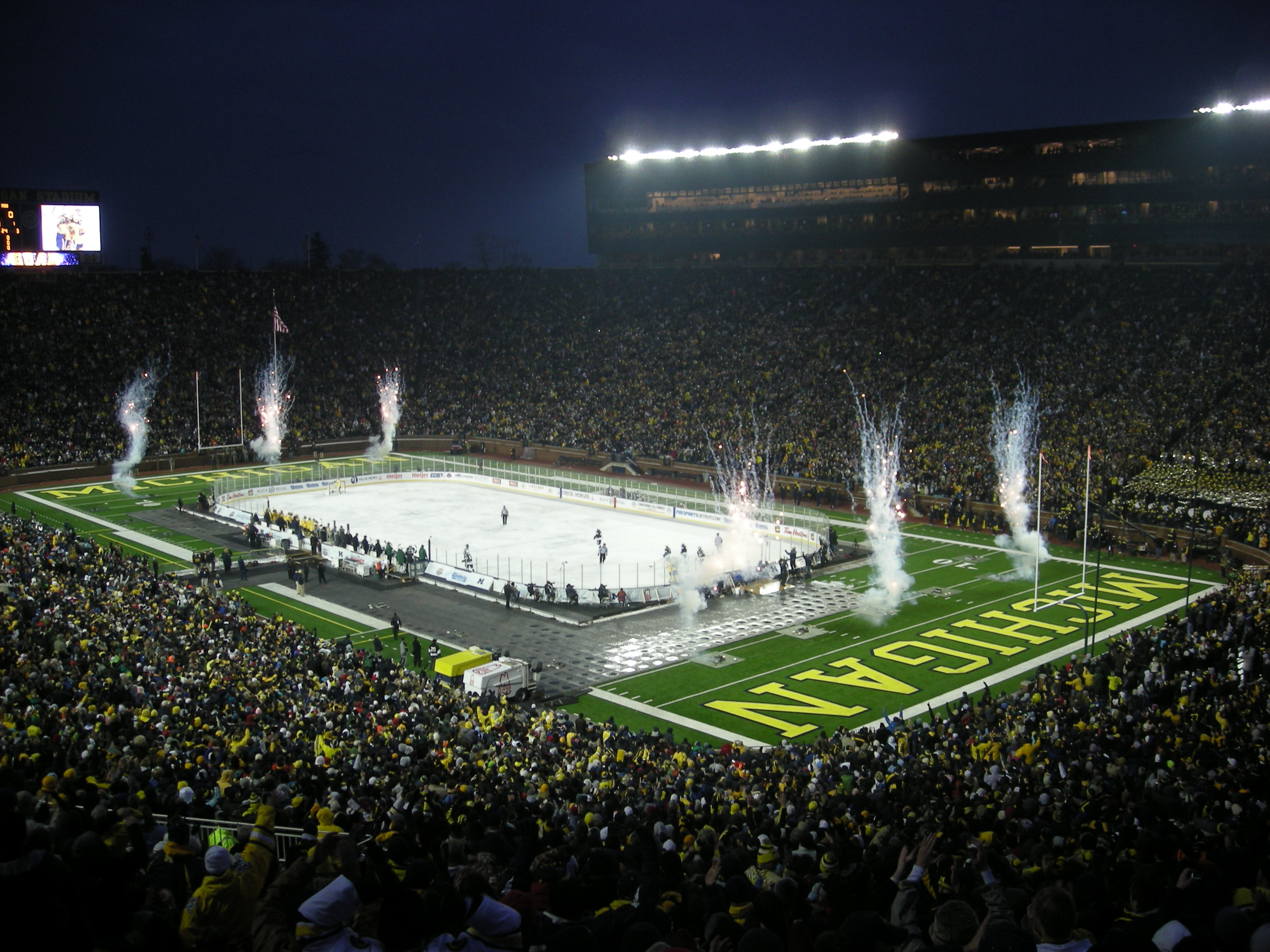
A record 104,173 fans watch Michigan vs. Michigan State at The Big Chill at the Big House

=== Men's ===
- Cold War – October 6, 2001, Michigan vs. Michigan State (Spartan Stadium)
- Frozen Tundra Hockey Classic – February 11, 2006, Ohio State vs. Wisconsin (Lambeau Field)
- Frozen Fenway 2010 – Boston University vs. Boston College, and Northeastern University vs. New Hampshire (Fenway Park)
- Culver's Camp Randall Hockey Classic – February 6, 2010, Michigan vs. Wisconsin (Camp Randall Stadium)
- The Big Chill at the Big House – December 11, 2010 held at Michigan Stadium set the ice hockey attendance record when 104,173 fans watched Michigan defeat Michigan State, 5–0.
- Frozen Diamond Classic – January 15, 2012, Michigan defeated Ohio State University, 4–1, at Progressive Field in Cleveland, OH.
- Frozen Fenway 2012 – Northeastern University vs. Boston College, Union College vs. Harvard University, and Maine vs. New Hampshire (Fenway Park)
- North Dakota and Omaha played in an outdoor game at TD Ameritrade Park in Omaha, Nebraska on February 9, 2013, with North Dakota winning, 5–2.
- Hockey City Classic – February 17, 2013, Notre Dame vs. Miami University, and Minnesota vs. Wisconsin (Soldier Field)
- Frozen Frontier – December 14, 2013, Rochester Institute of Technology vs. Niagara University
- 2013 Great Lakes Invitational – December 27–28, 2013 – The annual Detroit-based holiday tournament was moved outdoors from its traditional location at Joe Louis Arena to Comerica Park. The field consisted of Michigan, Michigan State, Michigan Tech and Western Michigan.
- Hockey City Classic – January 17, 2014, Minnesota vs. Ohio State (TCF Bank Stadium)
- Bowling Green State University hosted Robert Morris University in an outdoor game at Fifth Third Park in Toledo, Ohio, on January 3, 2015. The game ended in a 2–2 draw.
- Hockey City Classic – February 7, 2015, Miami University vs. Western Michigan, and Michigan vs. Michigan State (Soldier Field)
- The Battle on Blake – February 20, 2016, University of Denver Pioneers vs. Colorado College Tigers as part of the Battle for the Gold Pan at Coors Field.
- Robert Morris hosted Niagara in an outdoor game at Heinz Field in Pittsburgh, Pennsylvania, on February 26, 2017. The Colonials won the game 5–1. Admission was free of charge.
- Hockey Day Minnesota 2022 – As part of this annual event that features multiple college and high school games, Minnesota State defeated St. Thomas 7–1 on January 22, 2022, at Blakeslee Stadium in Mankato, normally home to Minnesota State football.
- Faceoff on the Lake – February 18, 2023, Michigan vs. Ohio State (FirstEnergy Stadium)
- Frozen Finley - March 1, 2023, North Carolina State vs. North Carolina at Carter Finley Stadium. The NC State Wolfpack won with a score of 7 to 3.

=== Women's ===
- January 8, 2010 Northeastern vs New Hampshire Fenway Park
- Culver's Camp Randall Hockey Classic February 6, 2010 Bemidji State vs Wisconsin Camp Randall Stadium
- Greater Rochester Frozen Frontier, December 14, 2013, Clarkson vs RIT Frontier Field
- Hockey City Classic January 17, 2014, Minnesota vs Minnesota State (TCF Bank Stadium)
- Hockey Day Minnesota 2018 – St. Cloud State defeated Minnesota Duluth 2–1 after a shootout at a temporary outdoor venue next to Lake George in St. Cloud on January 20, 2018.
- Hockey Day Minnesota 2020 – Minnesota defeated Ohio State at Parade Stadium in Minneapolis on January 18, 2020.
- Hockey Day Minnesota 2022 – On January 23, 2022, the day after the two schools' men's teams played at Blakeslee Stadium in Mankato, Minnesota State defeated St. Thomas 3–1 at the same venue.

== Longest-running annual international rivalry ==
A rivalry between the United States Military Academy (Army) Black Knights and the Royal Military College of Canada (RMC) Paladins resulted in an annual West Point Weekend hockey game. The series was first played in 1923, and was claimed to be the longest-running annual international sporting event in the world. Army and RMC played continuously from 1949 until 2007, when scheduling conflicts forced the academies to abandon the scheduled game. The game was not played from 2007 to 2010, nor in 2012, but has been held annually since. The most recent edition in 2020 saw RMC defeat West Point 3–2 in overtime, RMC's first win in the series since 2002.

== European collegiate league ==
In Europe, the first college hockey league called EUHL was founded in 2013.

In the United Kingdom, college hockey league is operated by BUIHA (British Universities Ice Hockey Association). It was founded in 2003 and currently includes 23 clubs across the UK.

== Professional hockey ==
For much of its history, college teams produced very few, if any, athletes that would play professionally. While there were several reasons for this, two primary causes established that trend. College teams were made up mostly by American player and professional teams preferred to use Canadians. Additionally, and because of that reason, the level of competition for college hockey was not viewed favorably. The perception of college hockey was so bad at one point that Red Berenson was told:

"If you go to an American college, you'll never become a pro."

While Berenson managed to defy those predictions, most players of his era did not. It wasn't until the NHL began expanding in 1967 that many alumni would even be looked at as potential professionals.

Over time, as many college players demonstrated that they could compete on the same level as their contemporaries from the Canadian junior leagues, The number of players able to continue their careers after graduating increased. Throughout the 80's and 90's colleges became a more acceptable pathway for potential NHLers and the effects having high-caliber talents on college rosters caused a change in the style of play. By the 21st Century collegiate programs were mirroring the NHL in its defensive schemes and had become one of the top producers of professional players. Now, college athletes can benefit from NIL deals. Minnesota, for one, having over $1M in cash to spend on athletes per year as of 2025.

== See also ==
- Battle for the Gold Pan Colorado based college hockey rivalry
- Beanpot Boston-area college hockey tournament
- College athletics in the United States
- College sports
- Ice hockey
- Great Lakes Invitational
- List of defunct college hockey teams
- List of ice hockey leagues#College
- List of NCAA Division I ice hockey programs
- NCAA Men's Ice Hockey Championship
- National Collegiate Women's Ice Hockey Championship
- USA Hockey
