= Peter Van Buskirk =

American ice hockey coach

Biographical details
- Born: 1946 (age 79–80); Hudson, Massachusetts, U.S.
- Education: University of New Hampshire; Boston State College

Playing career
- 1962–1965: New Hampshire
- Position: Defenseman

Coaching career (HC unless noted)
- 1972–1973: Saint John's High School (assistant)
- 1973–1979: Hudson High School
- 1979–1988: Holy Cross
- 1991–1996: Holy Cross (assistant)
- 1996–1997: Holy Cross
- 2000–2019: Holy Cross (women)

Head coaching record
- Overall: 167–146–8 (.533) [men's] 295–178–35 (.615) [women's]

Accomplishments and honors

Awards
- 1983 Edward Jeremiah Award
- Military career
- Allegiance: United States
- Branch: United States Army
- Service years: 1966–1968
- Rank: Second Lieutenant

Peter Van Buskirk (born 1946) is an American retired ice hockey coach. He was involved with both the men's and women's programs at the College of the Holy Cross since 1979, serving as the head coach for both at various times until his retirement in 2019. In that time, he recorded more than 400 wins between the two teams.

== Career ==
Van Buskirk got his start in college hockey as a player for New Hampshire. After graduating in 1965, Van Buskirk served as a Lieutenant in the United States Army during the early year of the Vietnam War. After mustering out of the military, Van Buskirk continued his education at Boston State College, earning a master's in education. He began teaching afterwards and eventually returned to hockey as an assistant coach at Saint John's High School. he became the head coach at Hudson High School the next year and led the program to five regional titles over the next six years. After the Hawks won the Division I state championship in 1978, Van Buskirk was a prime candidate for college programs. When the position at Holy Cross opened in 1979 he returned to the college ranks.

In his very first season with the Crusaders, Van Buskirk got the team to post a 20-win season for the first time as well as win their first postseason game in a decade. After a two-year hiccup, his team posted a second 20-win season and Van Buskirk was named as the co-College Division coach of the year in 1983. He continued to lead the team for another 5 years, producing mostly positive results, before stepping down in 1988. Three years later, he returned as an assistant and served in that capacity until Paul Pearl took a year off to earn his master's. In his absence, Van Buskirk served as head coach and helped the team earn its first postseason win in 14 years.

He left the program for a second time in 1997 but remained with the school, helping Holy Cross found their women's program and then became its head coach in 2000. Over the next 17 seasons, Van Buskirk helped the team become one of the top teams at the Division III level. The Crusaders won 6 open championships and finished as runners-up 5 other times. In 2017 the program made the transition to Division I and continued their winning ways in the NEWHA, finishing third in the standings. The next season Holy Cross joined Hockey East, one of the premier conferences, and Van Buskirk's team struggled mightily against the stiffer competition. The Crusaders won just one game all season, but suffered a further loss after the year when Van Buskirk announced his retirement, turning the team over to Katie Lachapelle.

== Head coaching record ==
=== Men's ===
Record table
Season	Team	Overall	Conference	Standing	Postseason
Holy Cross Crusaders (ECAC 2) (1979–1985)
1979–80	Holy Cross	21–9–0	15–6–0	6th	ECAC 2 East Semifinal
1980–81	Holy Cross	14–17–0	11–11–0	T–15th	ECAC 2 East Quarterfinal
1981–82	Holy Cross	16–15–2	12–10–2	15th	ECAC 2 East Quarterfinal
1982–83	Holy Cross	20–10–2	16–7–1	5th	ECAC 2 East Semifinal
1983–84	Holy Cross	10–15–3	8–10–2	17th	
1984–85	Holy Cross	19–15–0	12–9–0	11th	ECAC East Quarterfinals
Holy Cross:		100–81–7	74–53–5		
Holy Cross Crusaders (ECAC East) (1985–1988)
1985–86	Holy Cross	18–16–0	11–12–0	9th	
1986–87	Holy Cross	17–18–1	13–13–0	8th	ECAC East Quarterfinals
1987–88	Holy Cross	18–18–0	12–14–0	8th	ECAC East Quarterfinals
Holy Cross:		53–52–1	36–39–0		
Holy Cross Crusaders (ECAC East) (1996–1997)
1996–97	Holy Cross	14–13–0	11–8–0	T–7th	ECAC East Quarterfinals
Holy Cross:		14–13–0	11–8–0		
Total:		167–146–8			
National champion Postseason invitational champion Conference regular season champion Conference regular season and conference tournament champion Division regular season champion Division regular season and conference tournament champion Conference tournament champion

=== Women's ===
Record table
Season	Team	Overall	Conference	Standing	Postseason
Holy Cross Crusaders (ECAC East) (2000–2015)
2000–01	Holy Cross	7–14–1	4–13–1	15th	
2001–02	Holy Cross	12–12–3	7–11–0	7th	ECAC East Open Runner-Up
2002–03	Holy Cross	17–7–1	15–5–0	3rd	ECAC East Open Champion
2003–04	Holy Cross	10–13–1	7–9–1	T–6th	
2004–05	Holy Cross	12–14–1	9–9–1	T–5th	ECAC East Open Runner-Up
2005–06	Holy Cross	11–14–1	10–9–0	6th	ECAC East Open Third-place game (win)
2006–07	Holy Cross	15–10–2	11–7–1	5th	ECAC East Open Third-place game (win)
2007–08	Holy Cross	16–8–3	13–4–2	3rd	ECAC East Open Third-place game (win)
2008–09	Holy Cross	24–2–1	17–2–1	1st	ECAC East Open Champion
2009–10	Holy Cross	20–4–2	15–2–2	2nd	ECAC East Open Champion
2010–11	Holy Cross	17–9–1	13–5–0	T–3rd	ECAC East Open Champion
2011–12	Holy Cross	19–4–3	14–3–1	2nd	ECAC East Open Runner-Up
2012–13	Holy Cross	16–6–5	19–4–5	4th	ECAC East Open Runner-Up
2013–14	Holy Cross	18–8–1	11–4–1	3rd	ECAC East Open Runner-Up
2014–15	Holy Cross	18–7–3	11–4–2	5th	ECAC East Open Champion
Holy Cross:		232–132–29	176–82–18		
Holy Cross Crusaders (NEHC) (2015–2017)
2015–16	Holy Cross	24–3–0	14–3–0	T–2nd	NEHC Open Champion
2016–17	Holy Cross	22–5–0	14–3–0	3rd	NEHC Open Runner-Up
Holy Cross:		46–8–0	28–6–0		
Holy Cross Crusaders (NEWHA) (2017–2018)
2017–18	Holy Cross	16–9–3	15–3–2	3rd	NEWHA third-place game (loss)
Holy Cross:		16–9–3	15–3–2		
Holy Cross Crusaders (Hockey East) (2018–2019)
2018–19	Holy Cross	1–29–3	1–25–1	10th	
Holy Cross:		1–29–3	1–25–1		
Total:		295–178–35			
National champion Postseason invitational champion Conference regular season champion Conference regular season and conference tournament champion Division regular season champion Division regular season and conference tournament champion Conference tournament champion

== See also ==
- List of college women's ice hockey career coaching wins leaders

Awards and achievements
Preceded by Steve Stirling	Edward Jeremiah Award; 1982–83 (with Mike Gibbons)	Succeeded by Bob Peters
