= Penn State Nittany Lions ice hockey =

Penn State Nittany Lions ice hockey may refer to either of the ice hockey teams that represent Pennsylvania State University:

- Penn State Nittany Lions men's ice hockey
- Penn State Nittany Lions women's ice hockey
