= 2021 CHA women's ice hockey tournament =

2021 College Hockey America Women's ice hockey tournament
- Dates: March 4–6, 2021
- Teams: 6
- Finals site: Erie Insurance Arena; Erie, Pennsylvania
- Champions: Robert Morris (3rd title)
- Winning coach: Paul Colontino (3rd title)
- College Hockey America Women's Ice Hockey Tournaments

The 2021 College Hockey America Women's Ice Hockey Tournament was the 19th tournament in league history played between March 4 and March 6, 2021, at the Erie Insurance Arena in Erie, Pennsylvania. Robert Morris won its third tournament and earned College Hockey America's automatic bid into the 2021 NCAA National Collegiate Women's Ice Hockey Tournament.

== Format ==
All six CHA teams participated in the tournament. On the first day of the tournament, the top two seeds received a bye, while the #3 seed played the #6 seed, and the #4 seed played the #5 seed in the quarterfinal round. On the second day, the semifinal games featured the #1 seed against the lower remaining seed, while the #2 seed played the higher remaining seed. On the third and final day, the CHA championship was played between the two semifinal winners. There was a total of five games.

=== Standings ===
2020–21 College Hockey America standings
	Conference Regular Season							Overall					
	GP	W	L	T	PTS	GF	GA	GP	W	L	T	GF	GA
#8 Penn State†	20	16	2	2	34	70	29	21	16	3	2	72	32
#10 Robert Morris*	19	11	7	1	23	53	38	25	16	8	1	71	45
Mercyhurst	17	10	6	1	21	48	34	18	10	7	1	50	37
Syracuse	15	8	6	1	17	45	28	22	12	9	1	67	39
Lindenwood	16	2	13	1	5	24	56	17	2	14	1	24	62
RIT	15	1	14	0	2	9	64	16	1	15	0	9	68
Championship: March 6, 2021 † indicates conference regular season champion; * indicates conference tournament champion Rankings: USCHO.com

On the basis of points per game played, Mercyhurst (1.24) was the #2 seed in the tournament, and Robert Morris (1.21) was the #3 seed.

Round	Match	Name	Team 1		Team 2
1	March 4	Quarterfinal 1 (#3 v. #6)	Robert Morris 4	v	RIT 0
2	March 4	Quarterfinal 2 (#4 v. #5)	Syracuse 6	v	Lindenwood 0
3	March 5	Semifinal 1 (#1 v. #4)	Syracuse 3	v	Penn State 2
4	March 5	Semifinal 2 (#2 v. #3)	Robert Morris 3	v	Mercyhurst 2 (OT)
5	March 6	Championship Game	Robert Morris 1	v	Syracuse 0

The tournament's Most Outstanding Player was Robert Morris sophomore forward Maggy Burbidge, who scored the winning overtime goal in the semifinal game.

Robert Morris senior forward Lexi Templeman, freshman forward Ellie Marcovsky, junior defender Gillian Thompson, Syracuse senior defender Jessica DiGirolamo, and Syracuse senior goaltender Allison Small joined Burbidge on the 2021 all-tournament team.

The tournament champion earned a berth in the NCAA Tournament to determine the national champion. The Robert Morris Colonials were the number 8 seed out of 8 in the tournament and faced #1 seed Northeastern on March 15 in Erie, Pennsylvania, losing 5–1.
