= Providence Friars ice hockey =

Providence Friars ice hockey may refer to either of the ice hockey teams that represent Providence College:

- Providence Friars men's ice hockey
- Providence Friars women's ice hockey
