= List of college women's ice hockey career coaching wins leaders =

This is a list of women's college ice hockey career coaching wins leaders. It is limited to coaches with at least 250 wins. The all-time leader in wins is Mark Johnson, head coach at Wisconsin since 2003, with a career record of 701–124–57. The career leader in winning percentage is Russ McCurdy, head coach at New Hampshire from 1978 to 1992, with a record of 264–36–10 (.868). Kevin Houle, head coach at Plattsburgh State from 2003 to the present, has the second-highest winning percentage, with a record of 537–76–29 (.859).

== Key ==
*	Active as of 2026

== Coaches with 250 career wins ==
Statistics correct as of the end of the 2025–26 college women's ice hockey season.

Rank	Name	Years	Wins	Losses	Ties	Pct.	Teams
1*	Mark Johnson	23	701	124	57	.827	Wisconsin 2003–present
2	Bill Mandigo	37	698	185	60	.772	Middlebury 1989–2026
3*	Michael Sisti	27	613	262	69	.686	Mercyhurst 2000–present
4	Brad Frost	19	556	131	43	.791	Minnesota 2008–2026
5*	Mike Carroll	27	550	146	50	.771	Gustavus Adolphus 2000–present
6*	Joe Cranston	27	548	161	48	.756	Wisconsin–River Falls 2000–present
7*	Kevin Houle	23	537	76	29	.859	Plattsburgh State 2004–present
8	Katey Stone	27	523	284	58	.638	Harvard 1995–2013; 2014–2023
9*	Jeff Kampersal	30	510	352	99	.582	Princeton 1996–2016; Penn State 2017–present
10*	Dave Flint	17	502	198	56	.701	Northeastern 2008–present
11	Paul Flanagan	23	434	308	73	.577	St. Lawrence 2000–2008; Syracuse 2009–2022
12*	Katie King Crowley	19	426	193	63	.671	Boston College 2007–present
13*	Mark Bolding	18	395	134	28	.734	Norwich 2007–2018; Yale 2019–present
14*	Doug Derraugh	20	395	204	57	.646	Cornell 2005–present
15	Shannon Miller	16	383	144	50	.707	Minnesota Duluth 1995–2014
16*	Tom O'Malley	32	359	522	57	.413	Boston College 1995–99; Wayne State 2000–03; Sacred Heart 2004–present
17	Dave Clausen	22	348	214	37	.612	Utica 2002–2024
18*	Jim Plumer	23	341	306	78	.524	Amherst 2004–12; Vermont 2013–present
19	Greg Fargo	16	339	170	39	.654	Elmira 2008–12; Colgate 2012–2024
20	Brian Durocher	18	338	215	76	.598	Boston University 2005–2023
21	Laura Halldorson	17	337	142	31	.691	Colby 1990–1996; Minnesota 1998–2007
22	Brian Idalski	18	327	227	59	.582	Wisconsin–Stevens Point 2001–05; North Dakota 2006–2016; St. Cloud State 2022–2025
23	Heather Linstad	21	322	289	81	.524	Northeastern 1993–00; Connecticut 2001–2013
24	Dan Laughlin	22	312	223	46	.577	Wisconsin–Superior 2004–2025
25*	Chris Wells	18	320	246	75	.558	St. Lawrence 2008–present
26	Bob Deraney	20	319	288	73	.523	Providence 1999–2018
27	Digit Murphy	22	318	243	57	.561	Brown 1990–2011
28	Peter Van Buskirk	17	295	179	35	.614	Holy Cross 2000–2019
29*	Matt Desrosiers	12 (Note: Desrosiers co-coached with his wife, Shannon Desrosiers, from 2008–2014. These stats only reflect his time as the single head coach since 2014.)	314	101	35	.737	Clarkson 2014–present
30	John Marchetti	19	292	173	26	.621	Providence 1981–94; Yale 1998–2002
31*	Andrew McPhee	20	302	149	37	.657	Trinity 2002–11; Endicott 2014–present
32	Rick Seely	15	278	174	56	.602	Manhattanville 2000–02; Clarkson 2004–2008; Quinnipiac 2009–2015
33*	Maura Crowell	17	280	220	42	.555	UMass Boston 2005–10; Harvard 2013–14; Minnesota Duluth 2015–2024; Dartmouth 2024–present
34	Russ McCurdy	16	264	36	10	.868	New Hampshire 1978–1992
34*	Ann Ninnemann	20	264	219	50	.542	Wisconsin–Stevens Point 2006–present
35	Jackie Barto	17	261	272	53	.491	Providence 1995–99; Ohio State 2000–2011
36*	Nadine Muzerall	10	260	85	22	.729	Ohio State 2016–present
37*	Hilary Witt	20	255	344	60	.432	Yale 2002–10; New Hampshire 2014–present
38	Brian McCloskey	12	252	113	40	.672	New Hampshire, 2003–2014
39	David Venditti	23	251	255	59	.496	Southern Maine 2000–04; Colby 2004–13; New England 2013–2023

== See also ==
- List of college men's ice hockey career coaching wins leaders
