= 2020–21 Robert Morris Colonials women's ice hockey season =

Quarterfinals, L, 1-5 vs Northeastern
- Conference: 1st College Hockey America
- Home ice: Colonials Arena

Rankings
- USCHO.com: 10

Record
- Overall: 16-7-1
- Conference: 11-7-1
- Home: 8-4-0
- Road: 5–3-1

Coaches and captains
- Head coach: Paul Colontino (10th season)
- Assistant coaches: Logan Bittle; Jen Kindret; Ryan Gayso
- Captain: Lexi Templeman
- Alternate captain(s): Emily Curlett, Emilie Harley

The Robert Morris Colonials women represent Robert Morris University in CHA women's ice hockey during the 2020-21 NCAA Division I women's ice hockey season, the 16th overall in program history. Qualifying for the 2021 NCAA National Collegiate Women's Ice Hockey Tournament, the program ranked as the #8 seed.

The Colonials' five-girl senior class featured Emily Curlett, named an assistant captain, and Emilie Harley as well as forwards Anjelica Diffendal, Lexi Templeman, who served in the role of team captain, and goaltender Molly Singewald.

During the first period of a January 30, 2021 tilt versus the Rochester Institute of Technology Tigers, team captain Lexi Templeman recorded the first natural hat trick of her career, part of a four-point offensive outburst in a 7-0 shutout win. It marked the first natural hat trick scored by a Colonials skater since Michaela Boyle achieved the feat on November 24, 2019.

On Senior Night, celebrated on February 20, 2021, goaltender Molly Singewald made her first career start. A member of the Colonials Class of 2021, she recorded a shutout victory.

Making their fifth consecutive appearance in the CHA championship game, Gillian Thompson would score the game’s only goal, while Raygan Kirk recorded 36 saves in a tightly contested 1-0 victory on March 6 versus the Syracuse Orange, resulting in their third playoff crown.

== Offseason ==
=== Recruiting ===
| Player | Position | Nationality | Notes |
|---|---|---|---|
| Molly Pedone | Forward | United States | Played at Shattuck St. Mary's |
| Ellie Marcovsky | Forward | United States | Competed with the Selects Hockey Academy U19 program |
| Chace Sperling | Defense | Canada | Graduate of the Pursuit of Excellence Hockey Academy |

== Standings ==
2020–21 College Hockey America standings
| | Conference Regular Season | | | | | | | Overall | | | | | |
| | GP | W | L | T | PTS | GF | GA | GP | W | L | T | GF | GA |
|---|---|---|---|---|---|---|---|---|---|---|---|---|---|
| #8 Penn State† | 20 | 16 | 2 | 2 | 34 | 70 | 29 | 21 | 16 | 3 | 2 | 72 | 32 |
| #10 Robert Morris* | 19 | 11 | 7 | 1 | 23 | 53 | 38 | 25 | 16 | 8 | 1 | 71 | 45 |
| Mercyhurst | 17 | 10 | 6 | 1 | 21 | 48 | 34 | 18 | 10 | 7 | 1 | 50 | 37 |
| Syracuse | 15 | 8 | 6 | 1 | 17 | 45 | 28 | 22 | 12 | 9 | 1 | 67 | 39 |
| Lindenwood | 16 | 2 | 13 | 1 | 5 | 24 | 56 | 17 | 2 | 14 | 1 | 24 | 62 |
| RIT | 15 | 1 | 14 | 0 | 2 | 9 | 64 | 16 | 1 | 15 | 0 | 9 | 68 |
Championship: March 6, 2021 † indicates conference regular season champion; * indicates conference tournament champion Rankings: USCHO.com

== Roster ==
=== 2020–21 Colonials ===
| No. | Nat. | Player | Class | Pos | Height | DoB | Hometown | Previous team |
|---|---|---|---|---|---|---|---|---|
| 1 | | Raygan Kirk | Sophomore | G | 5' 8" (1.73 m) | | Ste. Anne, Manitoba | Team Canada U-18 |
| 3 | | Gillian Thompson | Junior | D | 5' 9" (1.75 m) | | Toronto, Ontario | Toronto Jr. Aeros (PWHL) |
| 4 | | Allyson Hebert | Sophomore | D | 5' 8" (1.73 m) | | St. Andrews West, Ontario | Ottawa Lady Senators (PWHL) |
| 5 | | Emily Curlett (A) | Senior | D | 5' 5" (1.65 m) | | Lapeer, Michigan | Little Caesars U19 |
| 7 | | Wasyn Rice | Junior | D | 5' 7" (1.7 m) | | Invermere, British Columbia | Ontario Hockey Academy |
| 9 | | Maggy Burbidge | Sophomore | F | 5' 4" (1.63 m) | | Falmouth, Nova Scotia | Nepean Wildcats |
| 10 | | Lexi Templeman (C) | Senior | F | 5' 2" (1.57 m) | | Staffa, Ontario | Kitchener Waterloo Rangers |
| 11 | | Alison Rodgers | Senior | F | 5' 8" (1.73 m) | | Oswego, New York | Minnesota Duluth |
| 12 | | Leah Marino | Junior | F | 5' 9" (1.75 m) | | South Lake Tahoe, California | North American Hockey Academy (JWHL) |
| 14 | | Courtney Kollman | Junior | F | 5' 4" (1.63 m) | | Calgary, Alberta | Edge School |
| 16 | | Michaela Boyle | Junior (RS) | F | 5' 3" (1.6 m) | | Reading, Massachusetts | Clarkson (ECAC) |
| 17 | | Molly Pedone | Freshman | F | 5' 8" (1.73 m) | | Trinity, Florida | Shattuck St. Mary’s |
| 18 | | Mackenzie Krasowski | Junior | F | 5' 8" (1.73 m) | | Keswick, Ontario | Toronto Jr. Aeros (PWHL) |
| 19 | | Marah Wagner | Sophomore | F | 5' 4" (1.63 m) | | Langley, British Columbia | North American Hockey Academy (JWHL) |
| 21 | | Kyleigh Hanzlik | Junior (RS) | F | 5' 9" (1.75 m) | | Wisconsin Rapids, Wisconsin | University of Wisconsin (WCHA) |
| 22 | | Emilie Harley (A) | Junior | F | 6' 0" (1.83 m) | | Syracuse, New York | Ontario Hockey Academy |
| 23 | | Ellie Marcovsky | Freshman | F | 6' 0" (1.83 m) | | Pittsburgh, Pennsylvania | Selects Hockey Academy U19 |
| 24 | | Anjelica Diffendal | Senior | F | 6' 0" (1.83 m) | | Pittsburgh, Pennsylvania | Pittsburgh Penguins Elite |
| 25 | | Joelle Fiala | Sophomore | F | 5' 7" (1.7 m) | | Clavet, Saskatchewan | Saskatoon Stars |
| 26 | | Anna Fairman | Sophomore | D | 5' 6" (1.68 m) | | Troy, Michigan | Belle Tire |
| 27 | | Chace Sperling | Freshman | F | | | Theodore, Saskatchewan | Pursuit of Excellence |
| 30 | | Molly Singewald | Senior | G | 5' 4" (1.63 m) | | Farmington, Minnesota | Culver Prep |
| 35 | | Arielle Desmet | Junior | G | 5' 4" (1.63 m) | | Charlotte, Vermont | North American Hockey Academy (JWHL) |

== 2020-21 schedule ==
| Date | Opponent^{#} | Rank^{#} | Site | Decision | Result | Record |
Regular Season
| December 3 | Lindenwood | | Clearview Arena • Pittsburgh, PA | Raygan Kirk | W 4-2 | 1–0–0 |
| December 4 | Lindenwood | | Clearview Arena • Pittsburgh, PA | W 4-0 | 2-0-0 (2-0-0) | |
| December 10 | Lindenwood | | St. Charles, Missouri | W 4-0 | 3-0-0 (3-0-0) | |
| December 11 | Lindenwood | | St. Charles, Missouri | W 2-1 ^{OT} | 4-0-0 (4-0-0) | |
| January 4 | Adrian College Bulldogs | | Clearview Arena • Pittsburgh, PA | W 7-0 | 5-0-0 (4-0-0) | |
| January 8 | Penn State | | Clearview Arena • Pittsburgh, PA | L 2-3 | 5-1-0 (4-1-0) | |
| January 9 | Penn State | | Clearview Arena • Pittsburgh, PA | L 1-4 | 5-2-0 (4-2-0) | |
| January 15 | Mercyhurst | | Erie, PA | T 2-2 ^{OT} | 5-2-1 (4-2-1) | |
| January 16 | Mercyhurst | | Erie, PA | W 3-2 ^{OT} | 6-2-1 (5-2-1) | |
| January 22 | at Syracuse | | Syracuse, NY | W 2-1 | 7-2-1 (6-2-1) | |
| January 23 | at Syracuse | | Syracuse, NY | W 2-1 | 8-2-1 (7-2-1) | |
| January 29 | Rochester Institute of Technology | | Clearview Arena • Pittsburgh, PA | W 5-0 | 9-2-1 (8-2-1) | |
| January 30 | Rochester Institute of Technology | | Clearview Arena • Pittsburgh, PA | W 7-0 | 10-2-1 (9-2-1) | |
| February 2 | Mercyhurst Lakers | | Erie Insurance Arena • Erie, PA | L 2-4 | 10-3-1 (9-3-1) | |
| February 5 | at Penn State | #8/9 | University Park, Pennsylvania | L 1-2 | 10-4-1 (9-4-1) | |
| February 6 | at Penn State | #8/9 | University Park, Pennsylvania | L 2-4 | 10-5-1 (9-5-1) | |
| February 9 | Mercyhurst Lakers | | Pittsburgh, Pennsylvania | W 3-2 | 11-5-1 (10-5-1) | |
| February 15 | at Rochester Institute of Technology | | Rochester, New York | W 5-3 | 12-5-1 (11-5-1) | |
| February 17 | at Rochester Institute of Technology | | Rochester, New York | W 5-3 | 13-5-1 (12-5-1) | |
| February 20 | Sacred Heart | | Clearview Arena • Pittsburgh, PA | W 1-0 | 14-5-1 (12-5-1) | |
| February 21 | Sacred Heart | | Clearview Arena • Pittsburgh, PA | W 8-0 | 15-5-1 (12-5-1) | |
| February 26 | Syracuse | | Clearview Arena • Pittsburgh, Pennsylvania | L 1-3 | 15-6-1 (12-6-1) | |
| February 27 | Syracuse | | Clearview Arena • Pittsburgh, Pennsylvania | L 1-4 | 15-7-1 (12-7-1) | |
College Hockey America Tournament
| March 4 | vs. RIT Tigers | | Erie Insurance Arena • Erie, Pennsylvania | W 4-0 | 16-7-1 (13-7-1) | |
| March 5 | vs. Mercyhurst | | Erie Insurance Arena • Erie, Pennsylvania | W 3-2 ^{OT} | 17-7-1 (14-7-1) | |
| March 6 | vs. Syracuse | | Erie Insurance Arena • Erie, Pennsylvania | W 1-0 | 18-7-1 (15-7-1) | |
NCAA Tournament
| March 15 | vs. Northeastern | | Erie Insurance Arena • Erie, Pennsylvania | L 1-5 | 18-8-1 (15-7-1) | |
*Non-conference game. ^{#}Rankings from USCHO.com Poll.

== Awards and honors ==
- Emily Curlett, All-USCHO.com Third Team
- Molly Singewald, CHA Goaltender of the Week (awarded February 22)
- Lexi Templeman, College Hockey America Player of the Week (awarded February 1)
- Lexi Templeman, CHA First Team All-Star
