= 2020–21 Penn State Nittany Lions women's ice hockey season =

- Conference: 1st College Hockey America
- Home ice: Pegula Ice Arena

Rankings
- USCHO.com: 8

Record
- Overall: 16-3-2
- Conference: 16-2-2
- Home: 9-0-1
- Road: 7-2-1
- Neutral: 0-1-0

Coaches and captains
- Head coach: Jeff Kampersal (4th season)
- Assistant coaches: Allison Coomey; Melissa Samoskevich

== Offseason ==
=== Recruiting ===
| Player | Position | Nationality | Notes |
|---|---|---|---|
| Alyssa Machado | Forward | Canada | |
| Maeve Connolly | Forward | United States | |
| Carrie Byrnes | Forward | United States | |
| Olivia Wallin | Forward | Canada | |
| Kiara Zanon | Forward | United States | |
| Jess Ciarrocchi | Forward | United States | |
| Lyndie Lobdell | Defense | United States | |
| Josie Bothun | Goaltender | United States | |
| Annie Spring | Goaltender | United States | |

== Regular season ==
=== Standings ===
2020–21 College Hockey America standings
| | Conference Regular Season | | | | | | | Overall | | | | | |
| | GP | W | L | T | PTS | GF | GA | GP | W | L | T | GF | GA |
|---|---|---|---|---|---|---|---|---|---|---|---|---|---|
| #8 Penn State† | 20 | 16 | 2 | 2 | 34 | 70 | 29 | 21 | 16 | 3 | 2 | 72 | 32 |
| #10 Robert Morris* | 19 | 11 | 7 | 1 | 23 | 53 | 38 | 25 | 16 | 8 | 1 | 71 | 45 |
| Mercyhurst | 17 | 10 | 6 | 1 | 21 | 48 | 34 | 18 | 10 | 7 | 1 | 50 | 37 |
| Syracuse | 15 | 8 | 6 | 1 | 17 | 45 | 28 | 22 | 12 | 9 | 1 | 67 | 39 |
| Lindenwood | 16 | 2 | 13 | 1 | 5 | 24 | 56 | 17 | 2 | 14 | 1 | 24 | 62 |
| RIT | 15 | 1 | 14 | 0 | 2 | 9 | 64 | 16 | 1 | 15 | 0 | 9 | 68 |
Championship: March 6, 2021 † indicates conference regular season champion; * indicates conference tournament champion Rankings: USCHO.com

== Roster ==
=== 2020-21 Nittany Lions ===
As of November 5, 2020.

| No. | Nat. | Player | Class | Pos | Height | DoB | Hometown | Previous team |
|---|---|---|---|---|---|---|---|---|
| 3 | | Alyssa Machado | Freshman | F | 5' 6" (1.68 m) | | Mississauga, Ontario | Oakville Jr. Hornets |
| 4 | | Maeve Connolly | Freshman | F | 5' 4" (1.63 m) | | West Roxbury, Massachusetts | Noble and Greenough |
| 6 | | Carrie Byrnes | Freshman | F | 5' 4" (1.63 m) | | Eden Prairie, Minnesota | Eden Prairie High School |
| 7 | | Olivia Wallin | Freshman | F | 5' 7" (1.7 m) | | Oakville, Ontario | Etobicoke Jr. Dolphins |
| 11 | | Kiara Zanon | Freshman | F | 5' 5" (1.65 m) | | Fairport, New York | USA U18 National Team / Kingston Jr. Ice Wolves |
| 13 | | Rene Gangarosa | Junior | D | 5' 10" (1.78 m) | | Rochester, New York | Niagara Jr. Purple Eagles |
| 14 | | Julie Gough | Sophomore | F | 5' 8" (1.73 m) | | Newcastle, Ontario | Durham West Jr. Lightning |
| 15 | | Jessica Adolfsson | Junior | D | 5' 9" (1.75 m) | | Linkoping, Sweden | Swedish national team/Djurgårdens IF |
| 18 | | Amy Dobson | Junior | D | 5' 6" (1.68 m) | | Hamilton, Ontario | Oakville Jr. Hornets |
| 20 | | Natalie Heising | Senior | F | 5' 5" (1.65 m) | | Wayzata, Minnesota | USA U18 National Team /Wayzata HS |
| 21 | | Anna Promersberger | Junior | F | 5' 8" (1.73 m) | | Fargo, North Dakota | Shattuck-Saint Mary's |
| 23 | | Jess Ciarrocchi | Freshman | F | 5' 4" (1.63 m) | | West Chester, Pennsylvania | The Hill School |
| 24 | | Lyndie Lobdell | Freshman | D | 5' 7" (1.7 m) | | Aurora, Illinois | USA U18 National Team /Chicago Mission |
| 26 | | Mallory Uihlein | Sophomore | D | 5' 7" (1.7 m) | | Edina, Minnesota | USA U18 National Team /Edina HS |
| 27 | | Izzy Heminger | Junior | D | 5' 4" (1.63 m) | | Dublin, Ohio | Ohio AAA Blue Jackets |
| 28 | | Mikayla Lantto | Sophomore | F | 5' 10" (1.78 m) | | Palmer, Alaska | Detroit Belle Tire U19 |
| 29 | | Rachel Weiss | Sophomore | F | 5' 7" (1.7 m) | | Calgary, Alberta | Canada U18 National Team/Pursuit of Excellence Hockey Academy |
| 30 | | Josie Bothun | Freshman | G | 5' 6" (1.68 m) | | Wyoming, Minnesota | Forest Lake Area High School |
| 31 | | Annie Spring | Freshman | G | 5' 6" (1.68 m) | | Winnetka, Illinois | Chicago Mission |
| 32 | | Cam Leonard | Junior | G | 5' 7" (1.7 m) | | Cary, North Carolina | Choate Rosemary Hall |
| 35 | | Jenna Brenneman | Senior | G | 5' 7" (1.7 m) | | Eagan, Minnesota | Breck School |

== Schedule ==
| Date | Opponent^{#} | Rank^{#} | Site | Decision | Result | Record |
Regular Season
| November 29 | Lindenwood | | Pegula Ice Arena • University Park, PA | Josie Bothun | W 3–0 | 1–0–0 |
| November 30 | Lindenwood | | Pegula Ice Arena • University Park, PA | Josie Bothun | W 4–1 | 2–0–0 |
| December 5 | Syracuse | | Pegula Ice Arena • University Park, PA | Josie Bothun | W 2–1 | 3–0–0 |
| December 6 | Syracuse | | Pegula Ice Arena • University Park, PA | Josie Bothun | T 2–2 ^{OT} | 3–0–1 |
| December 11 | at Syracuse | | Tennity Ice Skating Pavilion • Syracuse, NY | Josie Bothun | W 4–3 | 4–0–1 |
| December 12 | at Syracuse | | Tennity Ice Skating Pavilion • Syracuse, NY | Josie Bothun | L 2–4 | 4–1–1 |
| January 8 | at Robert Morris | | Colonials Arena • Neville Township, PA | Josie Bothun | W 3–2 | 5–1–1 |
| January 9 | at Robert Morris | | Colonials Arena • Neville Township, PA | Josie Bothun | W 4–1 | 6–1–1 |
| January 23 | Mercyhurst | #9 | Pegula Ice Arena • University Park, PA | Josie Bothun | W 2-1 | 7–1–1 |
| January 24 | Mercyhurst | #9 | Pegula Ice Arena • University Park, PA | Josie Bothun | W 4–1 | 8–1–1 |
| January 29 | at Lindenwood | #8 | Centene Community Ice Center • Maryland Heights, MO | Josie Bothun | W 6–2 | 9–1–1 |
| January 30 | at Lindenwood | #8 | Centene Community Ice Center • Maryland Heights, MO | Josie Bothun | T 2–2 ^{OT} | 9–1–2 |
| February 5 | Robert Morris | #8 | Pegula Ice Arena • University Park, PA | Josie Bothun | W 2–1 | 10–1–2 |
| February 6 | Robert Morris | #8 | Pegula Ice Arena • University Park, PA | Josie Bothun | W 4–2 | 11–1–2 |
| February 9 | RIT | #8 | Pegula Ice Arena • University Park, PA | Josie Bothun | W 2–0 | 12–1–2 |
| February 10 | RIT | #8 | Pegula Ice Arena • University Park, PA | Josie Bothun | W 7–1 | 13–1–2 |
| February 19 | at RIT | #8 | Gene Polisseni Center • Rochester, NY | Josie Bothun | W 5–0 | 14–1–2 |
| February 20 | at RIT | #8 | Gene Polisseni Center • Rochester, NY | Josie Bothun | W 5–0 | 15–1–2 |
| February 26 | at Mercyhurst | #8 | Mercyhurst Ice Center • Erie, PA | Josie Bothun | W 5–2 | 16–1–2 |
| February 27 | at Mercyhurst | #8 | Mercyhurst Ice Center • Erie, PA | Josie Bothun | L 2-3 | 16–2–2 |
CHA Tournament
| March 5 | vs. Syracuse* | #7 | Erie Insurance Arena • Erie, PA (Semifinal Game) | Josie Bothun | L 2-3 | 16–3–2 |
*Non-conference game. ^{#}Rankings from USCHO.com Poll.

== Awards and honors ==
- Josie Buthon, 2020-21 USCHO.com Rookie of the Year
- Kiara Zanon, 2020-21 Women's Hockey Commissioners Association National Rookie of the Year
- Kiara Zanon, 2020-21 Second Team CCM/AHCA All-American
