= Providence Friars women's ice hockey =

- Current season
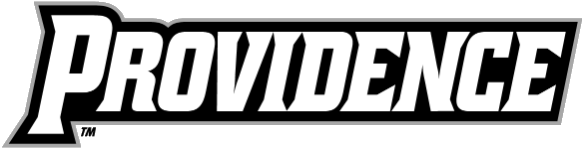
- University: Providence College
- Conference: Hockey East
- Head coach: Matt Kelly; 3rd season, 42–25–6
- Arena: Schneider Arena; Providence, Rhode Island
- Colors: Black, white, and silver
- Fight song: When the Saints Go Marching In (since the 1950s); "Friar Away"

NCAA tournament appearances
- 2005, 2021

Conference tournament champions
- ECAC: 1985, 1992, 1993, 1994, 1995

Conference regular season champions
- HEA: 2010

The Providence Friars women's ice hockey team is a National Collegiate Athletic Association (NCAA) Division I college ice hockey program that represents the Providence College. The Friars are a member of Hockey East. They play at the 3,030-seat Schneider Arena in Providence, Rhode Island.

== History ==
In the 1978–79 season, the Friars held the distinction of being the first team to play the new Harvard Crimson women's ice hockey team. The result was a 17–0 triumph. In 1984, the Friars won the inaugural Eastern College Athletic Conference Women's Championship.

In Jackie Barto's first season as coach in 1994–95, the Friars were 18–9–4 and won the Eastern College Athletic Conference title. The following season, the Friars reached the ECAC championship game, but they lost to New Hampshire in a game that lasted five overtimes. The 1996–97 season were one of the most successful as Providence went 20–8–2, posting the program's eighth 20-win season. In 1997–98, Barto guided the Friars to the ECAC Tournament for the 15th consecutive season.

Providence College made history on December 5, 2009, as the Friars came away with a 4–1 victory over #3 New Hampshire in Durham. Providence became the first Hockey East team to earn a victory at the Whittemore Center since the league's inception in 2002–03. On January 9, 2010, Providence College women's hockey earned their 600th victory by defeating #8 Cornell by a score of 6–3. Junior Jean O'Neill tallied a goal and an assist. Genevieve Lacasse made 22 saves to record the victory. Providence joined New Hampshire as the only two programs with 600 victories.

The Friars finished the season with a conference record 11–5–5 (overall record of 15–10–9) to finish atop the Hockey East standings for the first time. Bob Deraney won the Hockey East Coach of the Year award.

On January 10, 2011, the Friars and the Dartmouth Big Green played each other in an outdoor game at Fenway Park in Boston. Providence skater Brooke Simpson scored her first career NCAA goal. With 1:14 remaining in regulation, Big Green forward Camille Dumais scored the game-winning goal on Providence netminder Genevieve Lacasse as the Big Green prevailed by a 3–2 mark.

== Season-by-season results ==
Won championship	Lost championship	Conference champions	League leader

Year	Coach	W	L	T	Conference	Conf. W	Conf. L	Conf. T	Finish	Conference Tournament	NCAA Tournament
2025–26	Matt Kelly	11	22	2	Hockey East	8	14	2	9th HE	Lost First Round vs. Boston University (0–3)	Did not qualify
2024–25	Matt Kelly	20	12	3	Hockey East	16	9	2	4th HE	Lost Quarterfinals vs. Northeastern (2–3)	Did not qualify
2023–24	Matt Kelly	13	17	5	Hockey East	12	10	5	5th HE	Lost Quarterfinals vs. Boston College (1–2 OT)	Did not qualify
2022–23	Matt Kelly	22	10	4	Hockey East	15	8	4	3rd HE	Won Quarterfinals vs. Maine (5–2); Won Semifinals vs. Vermont (1–0); Lost Championship vs. Northeastern (1–4)	Did not qualify
2021–22	Matt Kelly	16	14	6	Hockey East	12	12	3	7th HE	Won First Round vs. Holy Cross (3–1); Lost Quarterfinals vs. Vermont (1–4)	Did not qualify
2020–21	Matt Kelly	12	8	1	Hockey East	10	6	1	3rd HE	Won Quarterfinals vs. Boston University (4–3); Won Semifinals vs. Maine (1–0); Lost Championship vs. Northeastern (2–6)	Lost First Round vs. Wisconsin (0–3)
2019–20	Matt Kelly	18	14	4	Hockey East	15	10	2	3rd HE	Lost Quarterfinals vs. New Hampshire (2–4, 0–1)	Did not qualify
2018–19	Matt Kelly	24	11	2	Hockey East	16	9	2	4th HE	Won Quarterfinals vs. Merrimack (2–0, 2–1); Lost Semifinals vs. Northeastern (2–3)	Did not qualify
2017–18	Deraney, Bob	17	13	7	Hockey East	12	7	5	2nd HE	Lost Quarterfinals vs. Connecticut (4–0, 0–3, 1–2)	Did not qualify
2016–17	Deraney, Bob	17	17	3	Hockey East	11	10	3	4th HE	Lost Quarterfinals vs. Vermont (5–4, 1–5, 2–5)	Did not qualify
2015–16	Deraney, Bob	10	26	2	Hockey East	6	16	2	7th HE	Lost Quarterfinals vs. Northeastern (2–5, 2–6)	Did not qualify
2014–15	Deraney, Bob	6	25	4	Hockey East	5	15	1	8th HE	Lost Quarterfinals vs. Boston College (2–6, 0–8)	Did not qualify
2013–14	Deraney, Bob	11	24	0	Hockey East	6	15	0	7th HE	Lost Quarterfinals vs. Boston University (2–3)	Did not qualify
2012–13	Deraney, Bob	15	16	5	Hockey East	8	10	3	5th HE	Won Quarterfinals vs. New Hampshire (5–4 OT); Lost Semifinals vs. Boston University (0–4)	Did not qualify
2011–12	Deraney, Bob	16	17	4	Hockey East	11	8	2	5th HE	Won Quarterfinals vs. Maine (6–0); Won Semifinals vs. Northeastern (2–0); Lost Championship vs. Boston University (1–2 2OT)	Did not qualify
2010–11	Deraney, Bob	22	12	1	Hockey East	12	8	1	3rd HE	Won Quarterfinals vs. Maine (5–2); Lost Semifinals vs. Boston College (2–3 OT)	Did not qualify
2009–10	Deraney, Bob	15	11	9	Hockey East	11	5	5	1st HE	Lost Semifinals vs. Connecticut (2-3)	Did not qualify
2008–09	Deraney, Bob	17	16	3	Hockey East	11	8	2	5th HE	Won Quarterfinals vs. Connecticut (3–0); Lost Semifinals vs. New Hampshire (1–3)	Did not qualify
2007–08	Deraney, Bob	16	16	4	Hockey East	10	8	3	4th HE	Won Semifinals vs. Connecticut (5–1); Lost Championship vs. New Hampshire (0–1)	Did not qualify
2006–07	Deraney, Bob	16	16	4	Hockey East	12	6	3	3rd HE	Won Semifinals vs. Boston College (3–2); Lost Championship vs. New Hampshire (1–3)	Did not qualify
2005–06	Deraney, Bob	17	14	4	Hockey East	11	8	2	3rd HE	Lost Semifinals vs. Boston College (1–3)	Did not qualify
2004–05	Deraney, Bob	21	11	5	Hockey East	14	4	2	2nd HE	Won Semifinals vs. Boston College(9–1); Won Championship vs. Connecticut (3–2)	Lost First Round vs. Minnesota (1–6)
2003–04	Deraney, Bob	21	13	2	Hockey East	14	5	1	2nd HE	Won Semifinals vs. Maine (4–2); Won Championship vs. New Hampshire (3–0)	Did not qualify
2002–03	Deraney, Bob	24	6	6	Hockey East	13	1	1	1st HE	Won Semifinals vs. Connecticut (7–0); Won Championship vs. New Hampshire (1–0)	Did not qualify
2001–02	Deraney, Bob	20	13	4	ECAC Eastern	11	7	3	4th ECAC E.	Won Quarterfinals vs. Maine (5–3); Won Semifinals vs. Niagara (3–2 2OT); Won Championship vs. Northeastern (1–0)	Did not qualify
2000–01	Deraney, Bob	18	14	3	ECAC	10	11	3	7th ECAC	Lost Quarterfinals vs. Harvard (3–4 OT)	Did not qualify
1999-00	Deraney, Bob	20	10	3	ECAC	14	7	3	6th ECAC	Lost Quarterfinals vs. Dartmouth (0–1)	Did not qualify
1998–99	Barto, Jackie	19	12	3	ECAC	15	8	3	5th ECAC	Lost Quarterfinals vs. Northeastern (0–3)	Did not qualify
1997–98	Barto, Jackie	9	21	2							
1996–97	Barto, Jackie	20	8	2							
1995–96	Barto, Jackie	17	13	0							
1994–95	Barto, Jackie	18	9	4							
1993–94	Marchetti, John	19	8	4							
1992–93	Marchetti, John	21	5	3							
1991–92	Marchetti, John	22	2	1							
1990–91	Marchetti, John	17	7	0							
1989–90	Marchetti, John	20	3	2							
1988–89	Marchetti, John	19	5	0							
1987–88	Marchetti, John	20	8	0							
1986–87	Marchetti, John	16	7	1							
1985–86	Marchetti, John	14	7	3							
1984–85	Marchetti, John	18	2	1							
1983–84	Marchetti, John	21	1	0							
1982–83	Marchetti, John	15	6	0							
1981–82	Marchetti, John	20	3	0							
1980–81	Marchetti, John	20	5	0							
1979–80	Palamara, Tom	20	2	0							
1978–79	Palamara, Tom	16	3	1							
1977–78	Palamara, Tom	7	4	1							
1976–77	Palamara, Tom	9	4	0							
1975–76	Palamara, Tom	4	6	1							
1974–75	Palamara, Tom	0	8	0							

== Players ==
- Jackie Barto's success in athletics began as a student-athlete at Providence, where she became one of greatest to ever don the Providence uniform. Barto (formerly Gladu) accumulated 113 career goals. Currently, she remains third on the all-time Friar goal list, trailing only Cammi Granato (1989–93; 139 career goals) and Stephanie O'Sullivan (1991–95; 126 career goals). Both of these players were coached by Barto. She is ranked fifth on Providence's all-time scoring list with 200 career points and 11th in career assists with 87. During her time as a Friar, Barto was associated with three of Providence's six ECAC championships, winning one as a head coach (1995), one as an assistant (1994) and one as a player (1984).
- On November 12, 2008, former Friar women's ice hockey player Stephanie O'Sullivan was one of four inductees enshrined into the Massachusetts Hockey Hall of Fame class of 2008. As a Friar, O'Sullivan was named ECAC Player of the Year and New England Hockey Writers Player of the Year in 1995. During the 1994-95 season, she scored 40 goals and 28 assists for 68 points. The only time she was not named to the ECAC All-Star Team was as a freshman. In her freshman year, she was named the ECAC Rookie of the Year. O’Sullivan is second all-time in career points (253), first in assists (127) and second in goals scored (126). O'Sullivan would go on to play for Team USA in the World Championships in 1994, 1997, 1999 and 2000.

=== Current roster ===
As of May 27, 2024.

No.	Nat.	Player	Class	Pos	Height	DoB	Hometown	Previous team
2		Lily Martinson	Junior	D	5' 10" (1.78 m)	2003-05-22	Allen, Texas	Dallas Stars Elite
3		Maddy Coene	Senior	F	5' 5" (1.65 m)	2002-02-28	Clayton, New York	Bishop Kearney Selects
4		Lauren DeBlois	Graduate	D	5' 6" (1.68 m)	2000-04-07	Lewiston, Maine	New Hampton School
7		Lindsay Bochna	Senior	F	5' 5" (1.65 m)	2002-02-05	Toronto, Ontario	Etobicoke Jr. Dolphins
8		Lily Hendrikson	Junior	F	5' 5" (1.65 m)	2002-08-12	Edina, Minnesota	Edina High School
9		Kiara Kraft	Freshman	D	5' 3" (1.6 m)	2005-04-21	Churchville, New York	Bishop Kearney Selects
10		KC Brooks	Senior	D	5' 7" (1.7 m)	2002-05-04	Colorado Springs, Colorado	St. Louis Lady Blues
11		Mégane Quirion	Sophomore	F	5' 3" (1.6 m)	2002-05-07	Saint-Eustache, Quebec	John Abbott College
12		Peyton Blaney	Freshman	D	5' 8" (1.73 m)	2004-12-16	Millgrove, Ontario	Etobicoke Jr. Dolphins
14		Grace Shirley	Graduate	F	5' 7" (1.7 m)	2001-07-20	Saskatoon, Saskatchewan	University of Wisconsin
15		Kayla Kutes	Sophomore	F	5' 7" (1.7 m)	2004-03-31	Kirkland, Washington	Rink Hockey Academy Kelowna
16		Reichen Kirchmair	Sophomore	F	5' 8" (1.73 m)	2004-01-16	Oakville, Ontario	Etobicoke Jr. Dolphins
17		Brooke Becker	Senior	D	5' 8" (1.73 m)	2002-05-30	Orchard Park, New York	Stoney Creek Jr. Sabres
18		Dylan Berman	Freshman	F	5' 5" (1.65 m)	2004-10-22	Deephaven, Minnesota	Shattuck-Saint Mary's
21		Taylor Gilmour	Freshman	F	6' 2" (1.88 m)	2005-03-12	Napanee, Ontario	Kingston Jr. Ice Wolves
22		Claire Tyo	Senior	D	5' 6" (1.68 m)	2002-08-28	Massena, New York	Ottawa Lady Senators
23		Ashley Clark	Junior	F	5' 3" (1.6 m)	2002-04-26	North Weymouth, Massachusetts	Tabor Academy
25		Hannah Johnson	Junior	D	5' 3" (1.6 m)	2001-09-26	Readfield, Maine	Syracuse University
26		Cristina Cavaliere	Sophomore	D	5' 5" (1.65 m)	2004-03-26	Mississauga, Ontario	Oakville Jr. Hornets
27		Rachel Weiss	Senior	F	5' 7" (1.7 m)	2001-02-19	Foothills, Alberta	Penn State University
29		Hope Walinski	Junior	G	5' 5" (1.65 m)	2002-07-28	Lincoln, Rhode Island	The Winchendon School
30		Avery Callison	Freshman	G	5' 8" (1.73 m)	2004-09-29	Acton, Massachusetts	Assabet Valley
32		Mireille Kingsley	Senior	G	5' 9" (1.75 m)	2002-06-20	Sudbury, Ontario	Mississauga Jr. Hurricanes
33		Taya Currie	Freshman	G	5' 8" (1.73 m)	2005-01-04	Parkhill, Ontario	Bluewater Jr. Hawks

=== Players with international experience ===
- Sandra Abstreiter, Team Germany U-18
- Chris Bailey
- Laurie Baker, Member of the 1997 U.S. National Team
- Alana Blahoski
- Lisa Brown-Miller
- Sara Decosta (born 1977), US Women's hockey goalie Olympic champion
- Cammi Granato, Member of the 1998 and 2002 US Olympic Team
- Sara Hjalmarsson, Sweden Women's National Team, 2019 IIHF Women's World Championship
- Mari Pehkonen, 2006 Finland Olympic Team
- Karen Thatcher, 2010 US Olympic Team

== Notable players ==
- Laurie Baker
- Sara DeCosta
- Cammi Granato
- Genevieve Lacasse
- Heather Linstad
- Mari Pehkonen
- Karen Thatcher
- Alison Wheeler

=== Cammi Granato ===
While at Providence College, she set every school scoring record. Granato was named Rookie of the Year as a freshman and Player of the Year as a sophomore, junior and senior. Granato led the Lady Friars to back-to-back conference titles in 1991–92 and 1992–93.

She finished her career with 256 points, a record she holds to this day. She is also the leader for single-season points with 84 (1992–93), goals with 48 (1991–92), and assists with 43 (1992–93). She is the all-time leading goal scorer at Providence College with an impressive 139 career tallies, and ranks second all-time in assists with 117.

In August 2008, Granato was inducted into the U.S. Hockey Hall Of Fame. In addition, Granato is one of the first two women honored in the Hockey Hall of Fame in Toronto, Ontario, Canada. She was inducted in November, 2010 along with Canadian Angela James.

== Awards and honors ==
=== ECAC Honors ===
- Laurie Baker, 1996 ECAC Rookie of the year
- Laurie Baker, Forward, 1996 All-ECAC Team
- Laurie Baker, 1996–97 ECAC First Team All-Star selection
- Laurie Baker, ECAC Player of the Week (11/19)
- Alana Blahoski, 1996 Co-ECAC Player of the Year
- Alana Blahoski, Defense, 1996 All-ECAC Team
- Sara DeCosta, ECAC Honorable Mention All-Star
- Sara DeCosta, ECAC Rookie of the Week (2/18, 3/11)
- Sara DeCosta, Women's Ice Hockey Letterwinner, 2000
- Bob Deraney, 2009-10 Hockey East Coach of the Year
- Bob Deraney, 2010-11 Hockey East Coach of the Year
- Cammi Granato, ECAC All-Star 1990
- Cammi Granato, ECAC All-Star 1991
- Cammi Granato, ECAC All-Star 1992
- Cammi Granato, ECAC All-Star 1993
- Cammi Granato, Eastern College Athletic Conference Player of the Year in 1991
- Cammi Granato, Eastern College Athletic Conference Player of the Year in 1992
- Cammi Granato, Eastern College Athletic Conference Player of the Year in 1993
- Catherine Hanson, ECAC Honorable Mention All-Star
- Sheila Killion, Forward, 1996 ECAC All-Tournament Team
- Katie Lachapelle, ECAC Honorable Mention All-Star
- Karen McCabe, 1996 ECAC Honor Roll
- Meghan Smith, Goaltender, ECAC All-Tournament Team
- Alison Wheeler, ECAC Honorable Mention All-Star
- Alison Wheeler, 1996 ECAC Honor Roll
- Alison Wheeler, Women's Ice Hockey Letterwinner, 1997
- Rookie of the Year: Marie-Philip Poulin, Boston University

=== New England Hockey Writer's ===
- Alison Wheeler, 1994–95 New England Hockey Writer's All-Star selection
- Laurie Baker, 1996–97 New England Hockey Writer's All-Star selection
- Kelli Halcisak, Defense, 2001–02 New England Hockey Writers Women's Division I All-Star Team
- Ashley Payton, Forward 2001–2002 New England Writers D-1 All Star Team

=== Hockey East ===
- Sandra Abstreiter, 2020–21 Hockey East Third Team All-Star
- Brooke Becker, 2020–21 Hockey East All-Rookie Team
- Jessica Cohen, Bauer Rookie of the Month, October 2009
- Lauren DeBlois, 2020–21 Hockey East Third Team All-Star
- Sara Hjalmarsson, 2020–21 Hockey East Second Team All-Star
- Maureen Murphy, 2017–18 Hockey East All-Rookie Team
- Maureen Murphy, 2017–18 Hockey East Second Team All-Star
- Maureen Murphy, 2018–19 Hockey East Second Team All-Star
- Genevieve Lacasse, Hockey East Rookie of the Year, 2009
- Genevieve Lacasse, Bauer Goaltender of the Month, December 2009
- Genevieve Lacasse, Hockey East Goaltender of the Month (October 2010)
- Jean O’Neill, WHEA Player of the Month, January 2010
- Mari Pehkonen, HOCKEY EAST All-Tournament team, 2007
- Karen Thatcher, 2004 HOCKEY EAST Sportsmanship Award
- Karen Thatcher, HOCKEY EAST Player of the Week Honors two times (11/8/04), and (1/31/05)
- Claire Tyo, 2020-21 Hockey East All-Rookie Team
- Laura Veharanta, Hockey East All-Rookie Team, 2009
- Sonny Watrous, Hockey East All-Rookie Team, 2004
- Sonny Watrous, Hockey East Rookie of the Year, 2004
- Sonny Watrous, 2004 HOCKEY EAST All-Tournament Team
- Sonny Watrous, Named HOCKEY EAST Player of the Week (1/19/04)
- Sonny Watrous, Three time HOCKEY EAST Rookie of the Week (2/2/04, 3/15/04, 3/22/04)
- Sonny Watrous, HOCKEY EAST Rookie of the Month (3/2/04)
- Sonny Watrous, HOCKEY EAST Player of the Week Honors twice (10/25/04, 1/10/05)
- Sonny Watrous, 2005 HOCKEY EAST All-Tournament Team
- Ashley Payton, 2003 Hockey East First Team All-Star
- Rush Zimmerman, 2004–05 Hockey East ITECH Three Stars Award

=== All-Americans ===
- Sara DeCosta, 1999 American Women's College Hockey Alliance All-Americans, Second Team

== Providence Hockey East All-Decade Team ==
- December 22, 2011: In recognition of the ten-year anniversary of the Women's Hockey East Association, the Friars announced their Providence Hockey East All-Decade Team. Six forwards, five defenders and two goalies were honored.

Player	Position	Class of:
Jenn Butsch	Forward	2003
Ashley Payton	Forward	2006
Darlene Stephenson	Forward	2004
Karen Thatcher	Forward	2006
Sonny Watrous	Forward	2007
Rush Zimmerman	Forward	2005
Kristen Gigliotti	Defense	2007
Kelli Halcisak	Defense	2004
Erin Normore	Defense	2009
Meredith Roth	Defense	2004
Kathleen Smith	Defense	2008
Jana Bugden	Goaltender	2007
Genevieve Lacasse	Goaltender	2012

== Friars in professional hockey ==
= CWHL All-Star	= NWHL All-Star	= Clarkson Cup Champion	= Isobel Cup Champion

Player	Position	Team(s)	League(s)	Years	Clarkson Cup	Isobel Cup
Sandra Abstreiter	Goaltender	Connecticut Whale Ottawa Charge Montreal Victoire	PHF PWHL			
Brooke Becker	Defense	Minnesota Frost	PWHL	1		
Brooke Boquist	Forward	Modo Hockey; Leksands IF; Toronto Six	SDHL NWHL			
Corinne Buie	Forward	Boston Blades; Boston Pride; Buffalo Beauts	CWHL; NWHL		1 (2015)	2 (2016, 2017)
Cammi Granato	Forward	Vancouver Griffins; BC Breakers	NWHL founded in 1999; WWHL	2		
Cherie Hendrickson	Defense	Burlington Barracudas; Boston Blades; Boston Pride	CWHL; NWHL		2 (2013 and 2015)	1 (2016)
Genevieve Lacasse	Goaltender	Boston Blades; Calgary Inferno; Canadiennes de Montreal	CWHL		2 (2013, 2015)	
Maureen Murphy	Forward	Montreal Victoire Vegas Vanguards	PWHL			
Noemi Neubauerová	Forward	Brynäs IF Toronto Sceptres Boston Fleet	SDHL PWHL			
Christina Putigna	Forward	Boston Pride	NWHL			1 (2021)
Meaghan Rickard	Forward	Boston Pride	NWHL			1 (2021)
Karen Thatcher	Defense	BC Breakers; Vaughan Flames; Minnesota Whitecaps; Boston Blades	WWHL; CWHL; WWHL; CWHL		1 (2013)	
Jessica Vella	Forward	Toronto Furies	CWHL		1 (2014	
Janine Weber	Forward	Boston Blades; New York Riveters; Boston Pride; Connecticut Whale	CWHL; NWHL PHF	1 (2015)		

== See also ==
- Providence Friars men's ice hockey
- Providence Friars
- List of college women's ice hockey coaches with 250 wins (John Marchetti ranks eighth on all-time list)
