= Bob Deraney =

American ice hockey coach

- Born: March 7, 1965 (age 61) West Roxbury, Massachusetts, U.S.
- Height: 5 ft 10 in (178 cm)
- Weight: 190 lb (86 kg; 13 st 8 lb)
- Position: Goaltender
- Caught: Left
- Played for: Johnstown Chiefs
- NHL draft: undrafted
- Playing career: 1987–1988

Bob Deraney is an American ice hockey coach.

== Playing career ==
Deraney was a member of the Boston University Terriers men's ice hockey team from 1984 to 1987. During his rookie season in 1984–85, Deraney was named the Terriers' Most Improved Player. In his second season, the Terriers won Hockey East and the Beanpot.

Shortly after, Deraney joined the newly formed Johnstown Chiefs of the All-American Hockey League. Deraney won the first game in Johnstown Chiefs history, a 5–3 victory over the visiting Carolina Thunderbirds. Deraney appeared in 13 regular season games, splitting time with future Chiefs general manager Toby O'Brien. Deraney also appeared in two postseason games with the Chiefs.

Deraney spent part of his professional career as a member of the Flint Spirits of the International Hockey League, but never appeared in a game.

== Coaching career ==
In 1989, Deraney joined the coaching staff of Northeastern University men's hockey team, as an assistant coach to Don McKenney.

Deraney joined the staff of Dartmouth College in 1990 as a recruiting coordinator and an assistant coach who worked with forwards, defensemen, and goalie. Although Dartmouth only won one game in Deraney's first season with the team, he helped reshape the team. Dartmouth finished the season ranked 45th in Division I, but by the time Deraney left the program in 1993, Dartmouth was ranked 29th nationally.

Deraney joined Providence College in 1999 as the Providence Friars women's ice hockey team's head coach. The Friars won five league championships and Deraney led the Friars to the Hockey East title in 2010.

Aside from his coaching duties within the NCAA, Deraney coached several national teams. Since 1989, he has been a member of USA Hockey national men's and women's player development programs. In 1996, he was a member of USA men's world junior team staff. In 1998, he was part of the men's USA Select team staff and was a coach at the USA women's national camp. Deraney also runs Deraney Hockey Schools, located at Providence College.

In 2018, Deraney was named the second head coach of the Shenzhen KRS Vanke Rays, a China-based team in the professional Canadian Women's Hockey League (CWHL). During the 2018–19 season, he left the position to return the United States while retaining player development position with the team.

== Personal ==
Deraney grew up in the West Roxbury area of Boston and currently resides in Shrewsbury with his wife, Michelle, and their two daughters, Danielle and Alexa.

== Awards ==
- Hockey East Champion - 1986
- Beanpot Champion - 1986, 1987

== See also ==
- List of college women's ice hockey career coaching wins leaders
