= Katie Lachapelle =

American ice hockey coach

Current position
- Title: Head coach
- Team: Holy Cross
- Conference: Hockey East
- Record: 56–145–17 (.296)

Biographical details
- Born: March 18, 1977 (age 49); Lewiston, Maine, US
- Education: Providence College

Playing career
- 1995–1999: Providence Friars
- Positions: Defense, forward

Coaching career (HC unless noted)
- 1999–2001: Union (assistant)
- 2001–2004: Niagara (assistant)
- 2004–2008: Ohio State (assistant)
- 2008–2017: Boston University (assistant)
- 2017–2019: Holy Cross (associate)
- 2019–Present: Holy Cross

Accomplishments and honors

Awards
- AHCA Women’s Assistant Coach Award (2013) , Hockey East Coach of Year (2026) , New England Coach of Year (2026)

Katie Lachapelle (born March 18, 1977) is an American ice hockey player and coach. She is the head coach for the Holy Cross Crusaders women's ice hockey team.

== Playing career ==
Katherine Lachapelle was born in 1977 in Lewiston, Maine. Her father was a vice-principal at Lewiston High School, and her mother was the principle of Lewiston Middle School. As a student at Lewiston High School, Lachapelle played three sports: softball, ice hockey and field hockey. She played on the boys' ice hockey team, because there was no girls team. In 1995, she was a member of the team that won the Class A state championship. Twenty years later, in 2015, she was inducted into the Auburn-Lewiston Sports Hall of Fame, in recognition of her success both as an athlete and a coach.

Lachapelle attended college at Providence College in Providence, Rhode Island, and played with the Providence Friars field hockey and ice hockey teams. She had a successful ice hockey career, playing both forward and defense. In her first year, she appeared in the longest women's ice hockey game on record at that time, the 1996 ECAC Hockey championship match against New Hampshire, which went into five overtime periods before New Hampshire claimed the win with a 3–2 score. The following year, Lachapelle was named to the ECAC Hockey All-Star Team. She was co-captain in her senior year, and finished her career with 98 points, on 40 goals and 58 assists, in 116 games.

== Coaching career ==
Lachapelle began her coaching career immediately following her graduation from Providence College in 1999, joining the Union Dutchwomen ice hockey program of Union College in Schenectady, New York as an assistant coach. She spent two years with the Dutchwomen, working with defensive players, running practices and assisting with recruiting. She then moved to Niagara University in Lewiston, New York, where she was the assistant coach of the Purple Eagles women's ice hockey team for three seasons. In 2002, while Lachapelle was the primary coach for the team's forwards, the Purple Eagles went to the Frozen Four. In 2004, she accepted a position as assistant coach for Ohio State University, to work with Buckeyes women's ice hockey head coach Jackie Barto, who had been Lachapelle's coach at Providence. Lachapelle stayed as the assistant coach at Ohio State from 2004 to 2008.

=== Boston University ===
Lachapelle joined the Boston University Terriers coaching staff as an assistant coach in the 2008–09 season. She would stay for nine years in this role, working with long-time head coach Brian Durocher. During her time as assistant coach, the BU Terriers won five conference titles, and made six straight appearances in the NCAA tournament. The Terriers made it to the NCAA Frozen Four twice, in 2011 and 2013; both years they played in the NCAA Championship game, ending the season national runner-up. In recognition of her contributions to the team's success, Lachapelle won the 2013 Women's Ice Hockey Assistant Coach Award, given by the American Hockey Coaches Association.

=== Holy Cross ===
Lachapelle left Boston University to become an assistant coach for the Holy Cross Crusaders women's hockey team, serving under head coach Peter Van Busick. In 2019, Lachapelle became head coach when Van Busick retired. In her first season as coach, the team went 5-20-2 in conference play and 5-23-5 overall. The start of the 2020–21 season was delayed because of the COVID-19 pandemic, but play resumed in November 2020.

=== USA Hockey ===
Lachapelle was selected as assistant coach of the United States women's national under-18 ice hockey team in 2013. She was an assistant coach with the team from 2013 to 2017, during which time the US women's U18 team won three gold medals and one silver at the IHF Women's World U18 Championships. Lachapelle became assistant coach with the US under-22 women's select team for the 2018–19 and 2019–20 seasons.

Lachapelle was chosen to be the head coach for the United States women's U18 ice hockey team for the 2021 IIHF Women's World U18 Championship. However, the championship, which was due to be played in Sweden in January 2021, was officially canceled in September 2020, due to the ongoing COVID-19 pandemic.

== Head coaching record ==
Record table
Season	Team	Overall	Conference	Standing	Postseason
Holy Cross Crusaders (Hockey East) (2019–present)
2019–20	Holy Cross	5–23–5 .227)	5–20–2 .222)	9th	
2020–21	Holy Cross	4–15–1 .225)	4–14–1 .225)	9th	
2021–22	Holy Cross	3–25–0 .107)	1–22–0 .043)	10th	
2022–23	Holy Cross	7-25-1 .227)	6-21-0 .222)	9th	
2023–24	Holy Cross	8-24-3 .271)	4-20-3 .204)	10th	Quarterfinals
2024–25	Holy Cross	10-20-4 .353)	6-17-4 .296)	9th	1st Round
2025–26	Holy Cross	19-13-3 .586)	10-11-3 .479)	4th	Semifinals
Holy Cross:		56–145–17 (.296)	36–125–13 (.244)		
Total:		56–145–17 (.296)			
National champion Postseason invitational champion Conference regular season champion Conference regular season and conference tournament champion Division regular season champion Division regular season and conference tournament champion Conference tournament champion
