= Laurie Baker (ice hockey) =

American ice hockey player (born 1976)

- Born: November 6, 1976 (age 49) Concord, Massachusetts, U.S.
- Height: 5 ft 7 in (170 cm)
- Weight: 135 lb (61 kg; 9 st 9 lb)
- Position: Forward
- Hockey East team: Providence
- National team: United States
- Playing career: 1994–2002
Medal record
Women's ice hockey
Representing United States
Olympic Games
| Gold medal – first place | 1998 Nagano | Tournament |
| Silver medal – second place | 2002 Salt Lake City | Tournament |
IIHF World Women's Championships
| Silver medal – second place | 1997 Canada | Tournament |
| Silver medal – second place | 2000 Canada | Tournament |

Laurie Baker (born November 6, 1976) is an American ice hockey player. She won a gold medal at the 1998 Winter Olympics and a silver medal at the 2002 Winter Olympics.

== Awards and honors ==
- 1997 Bob Allen Women's Player of the Year Award
- Inducted into the Providence College Athletics Hall of Fame on Saturday, February 13, 2016.

== Personal life ==
Laurie Baker lives in Concord, MA, with her husband, Craig, and two kids. She also works as the assistant athletic director at Concord Academy.
