= Meaghan Rickard =

American ice hockey player (born 1997)

- Born: January 15, 1997 (age 29) Covenrty, Rhode Island, United States
- Height: 5 ft 4 in (163 cm)
- Position: Forward
- Shoots: Right
- NWHL team: Boston Pride
- Played for: Providence Friars (NCAA)
- Playing career: 2016–present

Meaghan Rickard (born January 15, 1997) is an American ice hockey forward, currently playing for the Boston Pride in the National Women's Hockey League (NWHL).

== Career ==
Rickard scored 80 points in 146 NCAA games with the Providence Friars over 4 years.

Rickard signed a one-year deal with the Boston Pride of the NWHL on December 17, 2020, rejoining her former Friars teammate Christina Putigna.

== Personal life ==
Rickard has a degree in Elementary/Special Education from Providence College.

== Career stats ==
			Regular Season					Playoffs
Season	Team	League	GP	G	A	Pts	PIM	GP	G	A	Pts	PIM
2016–17	Providence College	NCAA	37	7	13	20	8	–	–	–	–	–
2017–18	Providence College	NCAA	36	6	12	18	16	–	–	–	–	–
2018–19	Providence College	NCAA	37	9	13	22	10	–	–	–	–	–
2019–20	Providence College	NCAA	36	8	12	20	10	–	–	–	–	–
2020–21	Boston Pride	NWHL	-	-	-	-	-	1	1	0	1	0
NWHL totals			-	-	-	-	-	-	-	-	-	-

== Honours ==
- 2016–2017 Named Providence Friars most improved player
- 2018–2019 Three Time Hockey East Top Performer
