= Taya Currie =

Canadian ice hockey player (born 2005)

- Born: January 4, 2005 (age 21) Parkhill, Ontario, Canada
- Height: 5 ft 8 in (173 cm)
- Position: Goaltender
- Catches: Left
- U Sports team: MacEwan University

Taya Currie (born January 4, 2005) is a Canadian university ice hockey player who is a goaltender for MacEwan University of the U Sports. In 2021, she became the first woman to be drafted in the Ontario Hockey League (OHL).

== Playing career ==
Currie played seven years of boys' youth hockey for the Elgin-Middlesex Chiefs. In 16 games in the 2019–20 season, she recorded a 3.19 goals against average and one shutout.

Although she did not play in the 2020–21 season due to the COVID-19 pandemic, Currie was drafted by the Sarnia Sting of the Ontario Hockey League (OHL) in the 14th round, 267th overall, becoming the first woman ever selected in the OHL draft. She attended Sting training camp ahead of the 2021–22 season, but as one of the youngest goaltenders present she was among the first players cut. In December 2021, she committed to play women's college ice hockey at Providence College. Had she entered the OHL, she would have voided her collegiate eligibility.

Playing women's junior hockey for the Bluewater Jr. Hawks of the Ontario Women's Hockey League in the 2022–23 season, Currie recorded a 2.00 goals against average and a .941 save percentage.

In her freshman season with Providence in 2023–24, Currie did not appear in any games due to a torn ACL sustained in preseason camp. Making her NCAA debut as a sophomore on October 5, 2024, Currie recorded a four-save shutout in a 6–0 victory over Saint Michael's College. She would only record minutes in one other game for the Friars.

On May 16, 2025, it was announced that Currie would leave the NCAA and transfer to MacEwan University of the Canadian U Sports for the 2025–26 season.

== Personal life ==
Currie attended Holy Cross Catholic Secondary School in Strathroy, Ontario.

== Career statistics ==
			Regular season									Playoffs
Season	Team	League	GP	W	L	T/OT	MIN	GA	SO	GAA	SV%	GP	W	L	MIN	GA	SO	GAA	SV%
2021–22	Bluewater Jr. Hawks	OWHL	3	0	3	0	149	6	0	2.42	.930	—	—	—	—	—	—	—	—
2022–23	Bluewater Jr. Hawks	OWHL	18	7	6	3	1,078	36	1	2.00	.941	—	—	—	—	—	—	—	—
2024–25	Providence College	HE	3	1	1	0	74	4	1	3.24	.556	—	—	—	—	—	—	—	—
OWHL totals			21	7	9	3	1,228	42	1	2.05	.939	—	—	—	—	—	—	—	—
