= 2020–21 Mercyhurst Lakers women's ice hockey season =

- Conference: 2nd CHA
- Home ice: Mercyhurst Ice Center

Rankings
- USA Today/USA Hockey Magazine: #9
- USCHO.com: #10

Record
- Overall: 10–7–1
- Conference: 10–6–2
- Home: 6–2–1
- Road: 4–4–0
- Neutral: 0–1–0

Coaches and captains
- Head coach: Michael Sisti
- Assistant coaches: Beth Hanrahan; Kelley Steadman
- Captain: Alexa Vasko
- Alternate captain(s): Rachel Marmen; Sarah Nelles; K.K. Thiessen

The Mercyhurst Lakers finished second in the CHA women's ice hockey. The team fell in overtime to Robert Morris University in the CHA semifinals and did not qualify for the 2021 NCAA Division I tournament.

This was head coach Michael Sisti's 22nd season. Following the end of the season, assistant coach Kelley Steadman announced she would be leaving. Steadman spent four seasons with the Lakers as a player from 2008–2012 and four behind the bench.

The season was shortened due to the COVID-19 pandemic.

== Departures ==
Player	Position	Nationality	Reason
Abigail Schauer	Forward	United States	Transfer to Syracuse University
Maggie Knott	Forward	Canada	Graduation
Sam Isbell	Defense	Canada	Graduation
Claire Werynski	Defense	United States	Graduation
Michele Robillard	Forward	United States	Graduation
Emma Nuutinen	Forward	Finland	Graduation
Céline Frappier	Forward	Canada	Transfer to University of Toronto
Kennedy Blair	Goaltender	United States	Transfer to University of Wisconsin

== Recruiting ==
Player	Position	Nationality	Notes
Sara Boucher	Forward	Canada	Alternate Captain of the Oakville Hornets
Mary Kromer	Forward	United States	Played for Lake Shore High School and Stoney Creek Jr. Sabres
Grace Nelles	Forward	Canada	Played for Team Canada at the 2020 IIHF U18 World Championship
Ena Nystrøm	Goaltender	Norway	Transfer from RPI
Jersey Phillips	Forward	United States	Played for Buffalo Regals 19U
Calista Rowbottom	Defense	United States	Team Captain for the Dallas Stars Elite
Chantal Ste-Croix	Forward	Canada	Alternate Captain for the Stoney Creek Jr. Sabres
Paige Whaley	Forward	Canada	Alternate Captain for the Stoney Creek Jr. Sabres

== Standings ==
2020–21 College Hockey America standings
	Conference Regular Season							Overall					
	GP	W	L	T	PTS	GF	GA	GP	W	L	T	GF	GA
#8 Penn State†	20	16	2	2	34	70	29	21	16	3	2	72	32
#10 Robert Morris*	19	11	7	1	23	53	38	25	16	8	1	71	45
Mercyhurst	17	10	6	1	21	48	34	18	10	7	1	50	37
Syracuse	15	8	6	1	17	45	28	22	12	9	1	67	39
Lindenwood	16	2	13	1	5	24	56	17	2	14	1	24	62
RIT	15	1	14	0	2	9	64	16	1	15	0	9	68
Championship: March 6, 2021 † indicates conference regular season champion; * indicates conference tournament champion Rankings: USCHO.com

== Roster ==
As of June 14, 2026

No.	Nat.	Player	Class	Pos	Height	DoB	Hometown	Previous team
1	(Canada)	Leah Klassen	Senior	G	5' 4" (1.63 m)	1998-07-28	Niagara-on-the-Lake, ON	Westminster School
3	(United States)	Gabrielle Cox	Sophomore	F	5' 4" (1.63 m)	2001-08-06	Niverville, NY	Boston Jr. Eagles
4	(Canada)	Grace Nelles	Freshman	F	5' 10" (1.78 m)	2002-01-18	St. Anns, ON	Stoney Creek Jr. Sabres
5	(United States)	Calista Rowbottom	Freshman	D	5' 4" (1.63 m)	2001-07-15	Catawissa, MO	Dallas Stars Elite 19U
6	(Canada)	K.K Thiessen (A)	Senior	D	5' 8" (1.73 m)	1999-07-07	Winnipeg, MB	Team Manitoba
7	(Canada)	Summer-Rae Dobson	Senior	F	5' 5" (1.65 m)	1999-06-15	Huntsville, ON	Ridley Tigers
8	(Canada)	Jordan Mortlock	Sophomore	D	5' 7" (1.7 m)	2001-01-15	Medicine Hat, AB	Pursuit of Excellence
9	(United States)	Mary Katherine Gialames	Junior	D	5' 7" (1.7 m)	2000-01-24	Pittsburgh, PA	Pittsburgh Penguins Elite
10	(Canada)	Alexa Vasko (C)	Senior	F	5' 5" (1.65 m)	1999-02-07	St. Catharines, ON	Stoney Creek Sabres
11	(Canada)	Sarah Nelles (A)	Junior	F	5' 6" (1.68 m)	2000-06-13	St. Anns, ON	Stoney Creek Sabres
12	(Canada)	Megan Korzack	Senior	F	5' 2" (1.57 m)	1999-02-16	Grimsby, ON	Stoney Creek Sabres
14	(Canada)	Sara Boucher	Freshman	F	5' 7" (1.7 m)	2002-05-06	Burlington, ON	Oakville Hornets
15	(Canada)	Rachel Marmen (A)	Senior	D	5' 5" (1.65 m)	1999-05-05	Oakville, ON	Stoney Creek Sabres
16	(United States)	Jersey Phillips	Freshman	F	5' 3" (1.6 m)	2002-05-25	Orchard Park, NY	Nichols School
18	(United States)	Mary Kromer	Freshman	F	5' 6" (1.68 m)	2002-05-07	Angola, NY	Stoney Creek Sabres
19	(Canada)	Emily Pinto	Junior	F	5' 3" (1.6 m)	1999-10-12	Mississauga, ON	Durham West Lightning
20	(Canada)	Paige Whaley	Freshman	F	5' 6" (1.68 m)	2002-09-22	Carlisle, ON	Etobicoke Jr. Dolphins
21	(Canada)	Alexane Rhéaume	Junior	D	5' 6" (1.68 m)	2000-11-30	Sherbrooke, QC	Champlain Cougars
22	(United States)	Alexandria Weiss	Sophomore	D	5' 6" (1.68 m)	2001-06-19	Plover, WI	Bishop Kearney Selects
23	(Canada)	Aubrey Cole	Sophomore	D	5' 11" (1.8 m)	2001-07-22	Sarnia, ON	Bluewater Jr. Hawks
26	(Canada)	Chantal Ste-Croix	Freshman	F	5' 4" (1.63 m)	2002-06-02	Brampton, ON	Cardinal Leger Secondary School
30	(Finland)	Jenna Silvonen	Sophomore	G	5' 5" (1.65 m)	1999-01-02	Lohja, Finland	Blues U20 (Naisten Liiga)
31	(Norway)	Ena Nystrøm	Sophomore	G	5' 10" (1.78 m)	2000-04-28	Stavanger, Norway	RPI Engineers (NCAA)
34	(United States)	Liliane Perreault	Sophomore	F	5' 7" (1.7 m)	2000-03-16	Hinsdale, IL	Chicago Mission

== Schedule ==
Date	Time	Opponent^{#}	Rank^{#}	Site	Decision	Result	Attendance	Record	Ref
Exhibition
January 2	3:05 pm	Adrian*	#10	Mercyhurst Ice Center • Erie, PA	Klassen	W 3–2	87	–	
Regular Season
December 5	3:00 pm	RIT	#11	Mercyhurst Ice Center • Erie, PA	–	Postponed	–	–	
December 6	3:00 pm	at RIT	#11	Gene Polisseni Center • Rochester, NY	–	Postponed	–	–	
December 10	3:00 pm	at RIT	#11	Gene Polisseni Center • Rochester, NY	Silvonen	W 2–1	–	1–0–0 (1–0–0)	
December 11	3:00 pm	RIT	#11	Mercyhurst Ice Center • Erie, PA	Silvonen	W 5–1	45	2–0–0 (2–0–0)	
January 6	3:05 pm	RIT	#12	Mercyhurst Ice Center • Erie, PA	Nystrøm	L 0–1	127	2–1–0 (2–1–0)	
January 7	3:00 pm	at RIT	#12	Gene Polisseni Center • Rochester, NY	Silvonen	W 4–0	–	3–1–0 (3–1–0)	
January 10	1:05 pm	Sacred Heart*	#12	Mercyhurst Ice Center • Erie, PA	-	-	–	-	
January 15	4:05 pm	#12 Robert Morris		Mercyhurst Ice Center • Erie, PA	Silvonen	T 2–2	115	3–1–1 (3–1–1)	
January 16	2:05 pm	at #12 Robert Morris		Clearview Arena • Moon Township, PA	Silvonen	L 2–3	–	3–2–1 (3–2–1)	
January 22	8:10 pm	at Lindenwood		Centene Community Ice Center • Maryland Heights, MO	-	-	-	(-)	
January 23	4:10 pm	at Lindenwood		Centene Community Ice Center • Maryland Heights, MO	-	-	-	(-)	
January 23	6:00 pm	at #8 Penn State		Pegula Ice Arena • University Park, PA	Nystrøm	L 1–2	140	3–3–1 (3–3–1)	
January 24	2:00 pm	at #8 Penn State		Pegula Ice Arena • University Park, PA	Nystrøm	L 1–4	143	3–4–1 (3–4–1)	
January 29	2:05 pm	Syracuse		Mercyhurst Ice Center • Erie, PA	-	-	-	-	
January 30	2:05 pm	Syracuse		Mercyhurst Ice Center • Erie, PA	-	-	-	-	
February 2	2:05 pm	#11 Robert Morris	#12	Mercyhurst Ice Center • Erie, PA	Nystrøm	W 4-2	–	4–4–1 (4–4–1)	
February 5	7:00 pm	at Syracuse	#12	Tennity Ice Skating Pavilion • Syracuse, NY	Nystrøm	W 5–2	–	5–4–1 (5–4–1)	
February 6	3:00 pm	at Syracuse	#12	Tennity Ice Skating Pavilion • Syracuse, NY	Nystrøm	W 2–1	–	6–4–1 (6–4–1)	
February 9	2:00 pm	at #11 Robert Morris		Clearview Arena • Moon Township, PA	Nystrøm	L 2–3	1	6–5–1 (6–5–1)	
February 18	6:05 pm	Lindenwood		Mercyhurst Ice Center • Erie, PA	Silvonen	W 6–2	–	7–5–1 (7–5–1)	
February 19	2:05 pm	Lindenwood		Mercyhurst Ice Center • Erie, PA	Nystrøm	W 4–2	–	8–5–1 (8–5–1)	
February 21	2:05 pm	Lindenwood		Mercyhurst Ice Center • Erie, PA	Silvonen	W 3–1	123	9–5–1 (9–5–1)	
February 26	6:05 pm	#7 Penn State	#13	Mercyhurst Ice Center • Erie, PA	Silvonen	L 2–5	98	9–6–1 (9–6–1)	
February 27	2:05 pm	#7 Penn State	#13	Mercyhurst Ice Center • Erie, PA	Nystrøm	W 3–2 ^{OT}	97	10–6–1 (10–6–1)	
CHA Tournament
March 5	7:30 pm	vs. #10 Robert Morris		Erie Insurance Arena (Semifinals) • Erie, PA	Nystrøm	L 3–2 ^{OT}	97	10–7–1 (10–7–1)	
*Non-conference game. ^{#}Rankings from USCHO.com Poll.

== Awards and honors ==
Goaltender Jenna Silvonen was named to Team Finland for the 2021 IIHF World Championship. Hockey Canada announced that Vasko was invited to the BFL National Women's Development Team Summer Camp. Vasko was also named a recipient of the Bill Smith Award.

Forward Rachel Marmen was named Second-Team All-College Hockey America and was drafted by the Toronto Six in the 2021 NWHL Draft.
