= Sandra Abstreiter =

German ice hockey player (born 1998)

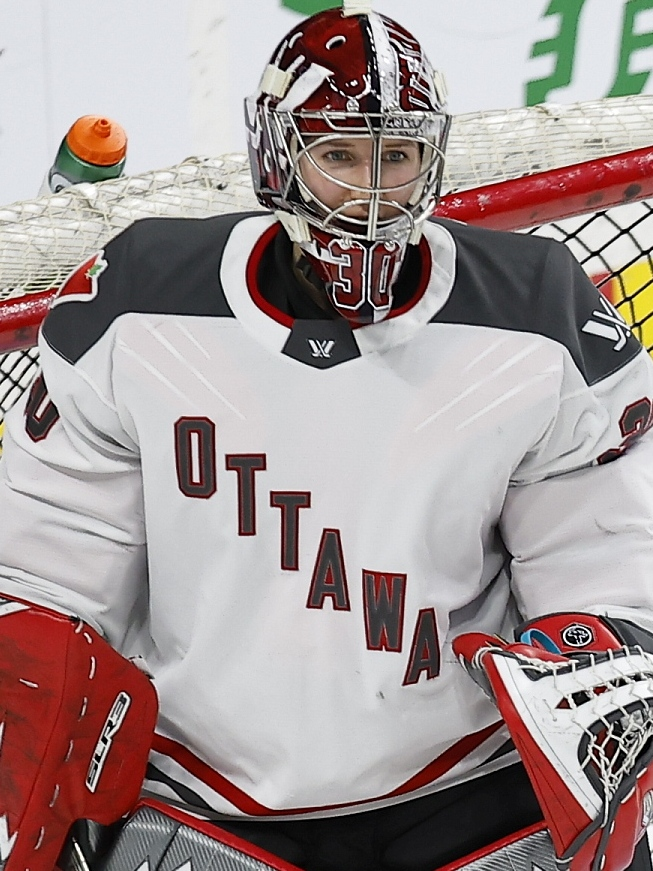
- Abstreiter with PWHL Ottawa in 2024
- Born: 23 July 1998 (age 27) Freising, Germany
- Height: 1.81 m (5 ft 11 in)
- Weight: 78 kg (172 lb; 12 st 4 lb)
- Position: Goaltender
- Catches: Left
- PWHL team Former teams: Montreal Victoire; PWHL Ottawa; ECDC Memmingen; ESC Planegg
- National team: Germany
- Playing career: 2011–present

Sandra Abstreiter (born 23 July 1998) is a German professional ice hockey goaltender for the Montreal Victoire of the Professional Women's Hockey League (PWHL) and a member of Germany women's national ice hockey team. She played college ice hockey at Providence.

== Playing career ==
=== NCAA ===
After not appearing in a game during her freshman season in 2017–18, Abstreiter made her Friars debut on 6 October 2018, at Schneider Arena versus the Bemidji State Beavers. She needed to make only fourteen saves in a 4–3 final, as the Friars fought back from a 3-0 setback, with Neve Van Pelt scoring the game-winning goal.

In Abstreiter's senior season with the Friars, the program qualified for the 2021 NCAA National Collegiate Women's Ice Hockey Tournament. Gaining the start in the tournament quarterfinals for the Friars versus the top-ranked, and eventual national champion, Wisconsin Badgers, Abstreiter assembled a valiant effort, recording 41 saves in a 3–0 loss.

=== Professional ===
She signed with the Connecticut Whale in the Premier Hockey Federation (PHF) ahead of the 2023–24 season. The PHF was bought out and dissolved in late June 2023 and her contract was voided before she was able to play in the league.

Abstreiter was drafted in the twelfth round, 68th overall by Ottawa in the 2023 PWHL Draft. In November 2023, she signed a one-year contract with Ottawa for the 2024 PWHL season. She signed a reserve contract with the Montreal Victoire for the 2024–25 season, but did not play in any games. On June 19, 2025, she signed a one-year contract extension with the Victoire for the 2025–26 season.

== International play ==
As a junior player with the German national under-18 team, she participated in the 2016 IIHF U18 Women's World Championship – Division I tournament, at which she served as backup netminder to Johanna May. Though she played in just one game, she posted an excellent .933 (93.3%) save percentage (SV%) and a solid 1.50 goals against average (GAA).

Abstreiter made her national senior team debut at the 2021 IIHF Women's World Championship, serving as third goaltender to starters Jennifer Harß and Franziska Albl. After entering in relief of Albl for the third period of the quarterfinal match versus Canada, she played twenty minutes in net, blocked 23 of 25 shots on goal, and achieved a .920 (92.0%) save percentage.

Following Harß's retirement, Abstreiter and Albl were tapped as the starting goaltenders for the 2022 IIHF Women's World Championship. The tournament was a tough showing for the two netminders, who both posted save percentages below .900 (90%) and goals against averages over 3.00.

Abstreiter was Germany's starting goalie at the 2023 IIHF Women's World Championship, where she tallied a superb .9286 (92.86%) save percentage across five games played and recorded her first World Championship shutout, in the preliminary round versus France. Her save percentage ranked third of all starting goalkeepers in the tournament and she was selected by the coaches as one of the three best players for Germany.

In the third game of Group B preliminary round play at the 2024 IIHF Women's World Championship, Franziska Feldmeier scored the game winning goal in third period versus Sweden in an April 8 match. With the win, Germany clinched first place in Group B competition. Abstreiter made 32 saves to register a shutout. It was the second shutout of her career in IIHF Women's Worlds competition. Abstreiter was recognized with the Directorate Award for Best Goaltender at the 2024 Worlds, posting a 1.19 Goals Against Average. In addition, she was one of seven finalists for the IIHF 2024 Women's Player of the Year Award.

In Germany's fourth game of Group B play at the 2026 Winter Olympics, Abstreiter faced 24 shots in a 2-1 win versus Italy. With the win, Germany clinched second in Group B.

== Career statistics ==
=== Regular season and playoffs ===
			Regular season									Playoffs
Season	Team	League	GP	W	L	OTL	MIN	GA	SO	GAA	SV%	GP	W	L	MIN	GA	SO	GAA	SV%
2013–14	ESC Planegg	DFEL	4	–	–	–	–	–	–	0.75	–	–	–	–	–	–	–	–	–
2014–15	TSV Erding U19	Germany U19 3	21	–	–	–	–	–	–	–	–	–	–	–	–	–	–	–	–
2014–15	ESC Planegg	DFEL	2	–	–	–	–	–	–	0.00	–	–	–	–	–	–	–	–	–
2015–16	ESC Planegg	DFEL	1	–	–	–	–	–	–	0.00	–	–	–	–	–	–	–	–	–
2015–16	VfR München-Angerlohe 1981	Germany2	2	–	–	–	–	–	–	1.20	–	–	–	–	–	–	–	–	–
2018–19	Providence Friars	WHEA	2	1	0	1	118:30	7	0	3.54	.841	–	–	–	–	–	–	–	–
2019–20	Providence Friars	WHEA	21	9	2	9	1174:12	34	2	1.74	.929	–	–	–	–	–	–	–	–
2020–21	Providence Friars	WHEA	21	12	8	1	1258:00	43	4	2.05	.929	–	–	–	–	–	–	–	–
2021–22	Providence Friars	WHEA	27	12	11	4	1633:02	47	3	1.73	.945	–	–	–	–	–	–	–	–
2022–23	Providence Friars	WHEA	33	19	10	4	1948:29	61	6	1.88	.926	–	–	–	–	–	–	–	–
2023–24	ECDC Memmingen	DFEL	7	–	–	–	397:53	6	3	0.90	.940	–	–	–	–	–	–	–	–
2023–24	PWHL Ottawa	PWHL	3	0	0	0	116:42	6	0	3.08	.913	–	–	–	–	–	–	–	–
2025–26	Montréal Victoire	PWHL	6	3	2	0	298:04	13	1	2.62	.905	–	–	–	–	–	–	–	–
PWHL totals			9	3	2	0	414:46	19	1	2.75	.908	–	–	–	–	–	–	–	–

== Awards and honors ==
Award or honor	Period
Providence Friars
Hockey East All-Academic Team	2018–19
Hockey East All-Academic Team	2019–20
Hockey East All-Academic Team	2020–21
Hockey East All-Academic Team	2021–22
Hockey East All-Academic Team	2022–23
Hockey East Defensive Player of the Week	Week of 20 January 2020
Hockey East Defensive Player of the Week	Week of 23 November 2020
Hockey East Defensive Player of the Week	Week of 30 November 2020
Hockey East Defensive Player of the Week	Week of 11 October 2021
Hockey East Defensive Player of the Week	Week of 3 January 2022
Hockey East Goaltender of the Month	November/December 2020
Hockey East Goaltender of the Month	December 2021
Hockey East Goaltender of the Month	February 2022
Hockey East All-Star Third Team	2020–21
Providence Friars Women's Hockey Program; Defensive Player of the Year	2020–21
Providence College Athletic Department; Female Athlete of the Year Award	2020–21
Hockey East All-Star Second Team	2021–22
National Goalie of the Year Semi-finalist	2022
PWHL
Walter Cup champion	2026
