= Jeff Kampersal =

American ice hockey coach (born 1970)

Current position
- Title: Head coach
- Team: Penn State
- Conference: AHA
- Record: 183–91–41

Biographical details
- Born: January 27, 1970 (age 56); Beverly, Massachusetts, U.S.
- Education: Princeton University

Playing career
- 1988–1992: Princeton
- 1992–1993: Capital District Islanders
- 1992–1993: Richmond Renegades
- Position: Defenceman

Coaching career (HC unless noted)
- 1996–2017: Princeton
- 2017–present: Penn State

Head coaching record
- Overall: 510–352–99

Accomplishments and honors

Awards
- 4× ECAC Coach of the Year (2002, 2006, 2009, 2016); 2× Ivy League Coach of the Year (2015, 2016); 3× CHA Coach of the Year (2021, 2023, 2024); 2× AHA Coach of the Year (2025, 2026); AHCA Coach of the Year (2026)

Jeffery Kampersal (born January 27, 1970) is an American ice hockey coach. He is the current head coach for Penn State. He previously served as the head coach for Princeton, where he is the winningest coach in program history.

== Playing career ==
Kampersal played college ice hockey at Princeton. He served as team captain during the 1991–92 season. He was drafted by the New York Islanders in the tenth round of the 1988 NHL entry draft. Following his collegiate career, he played for the Capital District Islanders of the American Hockey League (AHL) and the Richmond Renegades of the East Coast Hockey League (ECHL).

== Coaching career ==
=== Princeton University ===
Kampersal began his coaching career at his alma-mater, Princeton. During the 2005–06 season, he led the Tigers to a 21–8–4 record, and the NCAA women's ice hockey tournament for the first time in program history. He was subsequently named ECAC North Coach of the Year. During the 2015–16 season, he led the Tigers to a 22–9–2, their winningest season in program history. Following the season he was named ECAC and Ivy League Coach of the Year, and a finalist for AHCA Coach of the Year. He finished his tenure at Princeton with a 327–261–58 record in 21 seasons, becoming the winningest coach in program history.

=== Penn State University ===
On June 1, 2017, Kampersal was named the head coach at Penn State, becoming the second head coach in program history. During the 2020–21 season, he led the Nittany Lions to a 16–3–2 record, and their first regular season championship in program history. They also received their first top-ten national ranking in both the USCHO.com and USA Today/USA Hockey Magazine polls. During the 2022–23 season, he led the Nittany Lions to a 27–9–2 record, their first College Hockey America (CHA) tournament championship and first NCAA tournament appearance in program history. He was subsequently named CHA Coach of the Year and a finalist for AHCA Coach of the Year.

During the 2023–24 season, he led the Nittany Lions to a 22–13–3 record, their second consecutive CHA tournament championship and NCAA tournament appearance. Following the season he was named the CHA Coach of the Year for the third time in his career. During the 2024–25 season, he led the Nittany Lions to a 31–6–1 record, the Atlantic Hockey America (AHA) tournament championship, and their third consecutive NCAA tournament appearance. Their 31 wins marks a single-season program record. Following the season he was named the AHA Coach of the Year, his third consecutive coach of the year award.

During the 2025–26 season, he led the Nittany Lions to a 33–6–0 record, the AHA tournament championship, and their fourth consecutive NCAA tournament appearance. Their 33 wins set a new single-season program record. During the regional final of the 2026 NCAA tournament against Connecticut, Penn State earned their first NCAA women's ice hockey tournament win, and advanced to the Frozen Four for the first time in program history. Following the season he was named the AHA Coach of the Year, his fourth consecutive coach of the year award. He was also named the AHCA Coach of the Year.

== Head coaching record ==
Record table
Season	Team	Overall	Conference	Standing	Postseason
Princeton University (ECAC) (1996–2016)
1996–97	Princeton	13–16	12–10		
1997–98	Princeton	12–16–2	8–13–1		
1998–99	Princeton	15–14–1	14–11–1	7th	
1999–00	Princeton	11–13–5	9–12–3	9th	
2000–01	Princeton	13–13–3	8–13–3	10th	
2001–02	Princeton	15–11–3	10–6	5th	
2002–03	Princeton	20–9–2	11–5	3rd	
2003–04	Princeton	20–11	12–6	5th	
2004–05	Princeton	16–10–5	10–7–3	6th	
2005–06	Princeton	21–8–4	15–3–2	2nd	NCAA Quarterfinals
2006–07	Princeton	16–12–3	14–6–2	4th	
2007–08	Princeton	14–12–6	11–8–3	5th	
2008–09	Princeton	18–11–2	15–6–1	3rd	
2009–10	Princeton	13–14–4	11–7–4	5th	
2010–11	Princeton	16–14–1	13–8–1	4th	
2011–12	Princeton	12–15–4	10–10–2	7th	
2012–13	Princeton	11–16–2	6–14–2	9th	
2013–14	Princeton	14–13–4	10–9–3	6th	
2014–15	Princeton	15–14–2	13–8–1	6th	
2015–16	Princeton	22–9–2	14–6–2	3rd	NCAA Quarterfinals
2016–17	Princeton	20–10–3	14–6–2	4th	
Princeton:		327–261–58	240–174–36		
Penn State University (CHA) (2017–2024)
2017–18	Penn State	10–15–11	6–7–7	4th	
2018–19	Penn State	13–14–9	6–9–5	5th	
2019–20	Penn State	13–15–8	7–8–5	4th	
2020–21	Penn State	16–3–2	16–2–2	1st	
2021–22	Penn State	18–10–5	8–3–3	2nd	
2022–23	Penn State	27–9–2	12–1–1	1st	NCAA First Round
2023–24	Penn State	22–13–3	14–4–2	1st	NCAA First Round
Penn State University (AHA) (2024–present)
2024–25	Penn State	31–6–1	19–1–0	1st	NCAA First Round
2025–26	Penn State	33–6–0	22–2–0	1st	NCAA Frozen Four
Penn State:		183–91–41	110–37–25		
Total:		510–352–99			
National champion Postseason invitational champion Conference regular season champion Conference regular season and conference tournament champion Division regular season champion Division regular season and conference tournament champion Conference tournament champion

== See also ==
- List of college women's ice hockey career coaching wins leaders
