= Holy Cross Crusaders women's ice hockey =

- University: College of the Holy Cross
- Conference: Hockey East
- Governing Body: NCAA
- First season: 1999
- Head coach: Katie Lachapelle; 8th season, 12–63–6
- Assistant coaches: Meredith Roth; Devan Taylor
- Captain(s): Bailey Bennett; Carlie Magier; Sofia Smithson
- Arena: Hart Center; Worcester, Massachusetts
- Colors: Royal purple

The Holy Cross Crusaders women's ice hockey is the team that is a National Collegiate Athletic Association (NCAA) Division I college ice hockey program who is representing the College of the Holy Cross. The Crusaders are the newest member of the Hockey East Association (HEA). They play at the Hart Center in Worcester, Massachusetts.

== History ==
Holy Cross women's ice hockey became a varsity sport in 1999, after ten years as a club sport and two years as semi-varsity team. They joined the ECAC East conference, which later became the New England Hockey Conference (NEHC).

Jane Ford, former director of telecommunications for Holy Cross, served as head coach for the inaugural season. Then Peter VanBuskirk took over as head coach in the 2000–01 season, after having coached the Holy Cross men's ice hockey team for ten years. He was head coach for the women's team for nineteen years.

Holy Cross finished first in their conference in the 2008–09 season, with a 24–2–1 record, and won the ECAC Open Championship against Sacred Heart by a score of 4–2. They had six post-season titles while playing in the ECAC East/NEHC: 2003, 2009, 2010, 2011, 2015, and 2016.

After two years of discussions with the Hockey East Association, Holy Cross joined the conference for the 2018–19 season. They were the 10th team to join the conference.

Holy Cross earned their first Hockey East win on November 30, 2018, in a 5–3 victory against the powerhouse Northeastern Huskies. Jada Brenon, the team's freshman goalie, made 34 saves in the win, which was played at home at the Hart Center.

In 2019, VanBuskirk retired as head coach. After nineteen seasons with the women's team, he finished with a record of 295–178–35. He was elected as an honorary member of the Holy Cross Athletic Hall of Fame in 2020.

Katie Lachapelle stepped in as head coach in 2019–20, after serving as the associate head coach for two years. Prior to coming to Holy Cross, she had been assistant coach at Boston University for nine seasons. She has also been an assistant coach at Ohio State, Niagara, and Union. Lachapelle graduated from Providence College, where she played for the Friars. She was captain in her senior year and was on the ECAC All Star Team in 1997. In May 2020, Lachapelle was named as the head coach for the United States women's national under-18 ice hockey team. The IIHF subsequently canceled the 2021 U-18 Women's World Championships that had been scheduled to take place in January 2021.

Meredith Roth joined the coaching staff as associate coach for the Crusaders in 2019, after serving as the head coach for the Green Knights women's ice hockey program at St. Norbert's College, in Division III NCAA ice hockey. Devan Taylor joined the coaching staff as assistant coach in 2020.

In the 2019–2020 season, the Crusaders recorded their first Hockey East series sweep, against the Merrimack Warriors. They finished the season in 9th place, with a 5–23–5 overall record.

The start of the 2020–21 season was delayed due to concerns related to the COVID-19 pandemic. A modified schedule was released by the Hockey East Association in early November 2020, based on discussions by the Hockey East's Return to Play Task Force. Hockey East women's ice hockey teams, including Holy Cross, are scheduled to play 18 games that will count towards the final league standings. The Crusaders played their first series of the new season against the Maine Black Bears, on home ice, from November 20–21. Holy Cross lost the first match-up by a score of 2–1 but won the second game by a score of 3–2.

The team's co-captains for the 2020–2021 season are Carlie Magier, Antonia Matzuka, and Julia Pelletier.

== Season-by-season results ==
National champions	Conference champions	Lost championship	League leader

Season	Coach	W	L	T	Conference	Conf. W	Conf. L	Conf. T	Finish	Conference Tournament	NCAA Tournament	Reference
2024–25	Katie Lachapelle	10	20	4	Hockey East	6	17	4	9th	Lost First Round vs. Vermont (2–3 OT)	Did not qualify	
2023–24	Katie Lachapelle	8	24	3	Hockey East	4	20	3	10th	Won First Round Open vs. Boston University (4–2); Lost Quarterfinals vs. Connecticut (2–4)	Did not qualify	
2022–23	Katie Lachapelle	7	26	1	Hockey East	6	21	0	9th	Lost First Round vs. New Hampshire (3–6)	Did not qualify	
2021–22	Katie Lachapelle	3	30	0	Hockey East	1	26	0	10th	Lost First Round vs. Providence (1–3)	Did not qualify	
2020–21	Katie Lachapelle	4	15	1	Hockey East	4	14	1	9th	Did not qualify	Did not qualify	
2019–20	Katie Lachapelle	5	23	5	Hockey East	5	20	2	9th	Did not qualify	Did not qualify	
2018–19	Peter VanBuskirk	1	29	3	Hockey East	1	25	1	10th	Did not qualify	Did not qualify	
2017–18	Peter VanBuskirk	16	9	3	NEWHA				3rd	Lost NEWHA Semifinals vs Sacred Heart (1–3) Lost NEWHA Third-place game vs Franklin Pierce (3–4 OT)	Did not qualify	
2016–17	Peter VanBuskirk	22	5	0	NEHC	14	3	0	3rd	Lost NEHC Open Championship (Division II) vs. St. Anselm (2–3 OT)	Did not qualify	
2015–16	Peter VanBuskirk	24	3	0	NEHC	14	3	0	2nd (T) NEHC	Won NEHC Open Championship (Division II) vs. St. Anselm (4–3)	Did not qualify	
2014–15	Peter VanBuskirk	18	7	3	ECAC Division III East (NCAA Division I)	11	4	2		Won ECAC Open Championship (Division II) vs. Franklin Pierce (4–1)	Did not qualify	
2013–14	Peter VanBuskirk	18	8	1	ECAC Division III East (NCAA Division I)	11	4	1	3rd	Lost ECAC Open Championship (Division II) vs St. Anselm (1–2)	Did not qualify	
2012–13	Peter VanBuskirk	16	6	5	ECAC Division III East (NCAA Division I)	9	4	5	4th	Lost ECAC Open Championship (Division II) vs. St Anselm (3–4 OT)	Did not qualify	
2011–12	Peter VanBuskirk	19	4	3	ECAC Division III East (NCAA Division I)	14	3	1	2nd	Lost ECAC Open Championship vs St. Anselm (3–7)	Did not qualify	
2010–11	Peter VanBuskirk	17	9	1	ECAC Division III East (NCAA Division I)	13	5	0	T3rd	Won ECAC Open Championship vs. St. Anselm (4–4, SO)	Did not qualify	
2009–10	Peter VanBuskirk	20	4	2	ECAC Division III East (NCAA Division I)	15	2	2	T3	Won ECAC Open Championship vs St Anselm (3–1)	Did not qualify	
2008–09	Peter VanBuskirk	24	2	1	ECAC Division III East (NCAA Division I)	17	2	1	1st ECAC East	Won ECAC Open Championship vs Sacred Heart (4–2)	Did not qualify	
2007–08	Peter VanBuskirk	16	8	3	ECAC Division III East (NCAA Division I)	13	4	2		Lost ECAC Open SemiFinal vs. Sacred Heart (2–6) Won Third place vs St. Michaels (4–2)	Did not qualify	
2006–07	Peter VanBuskirk	15	10	2	ECAC Division III East (NCAA Division I)	11	7	1		Third Place ECAC Open		
2005–06	Peter VanBuskirk	11	14	1	ECAC Division III East (NCAA Division I)	10	9	0		Third Place ECAC Open		
2004–05	Peter Van Buskirk	12	14	1	ECAC Division III East (NCAA Division I)	9	9	1		Lost ECAC Open Championship Game		
2003–04	Peter VanBuskirk	10	13	1	ECAC Division III East (NCAA Division I)	6	10	1				
2002–03	Peter VanBuskirk	17	7	1	ECAC Division III East (NCAA Division I)	15	5	0		Won ECAC Open Championship Game		
2001–02	Peter VanBuskirk	12	12	3	ECAC Division III East (NCAA Division I)	7	11	0				
2000–01	Peter VanBuskirk	7	14	1	ECAC Division III East (NCAA Division I)	3	14	1				
1999–2000	Jane Ford	13	17	0	ECAC Division III East (NCAA Division I)							

== Coaches ==
Tenure	Coach	Years	Record	Pct.
2019–present	Katie Lachapelle	3	13–68–6	.184
2000–2019	Peter Van Buskirk	19	295–178–35	.615
1999–2000	Jane Ford	1	13–17–0	.433
Totals	3 coaches	23 seasons	321–263–41	.546

== Awards and honors ==
=== ECAC East Player of the Year ===
Stacey Hochkins, 2010

=== ECAC Open Tournament Most Outstanding Player ===
Stacey Hochkins, 2010

=== CCM All American Team ===
Stacey Hochkins, 2009–10 East Second Team All-Star

Stacey Hochkins, 2010–11 East Second Team All Star

Stacey Hochkins, 2011–12 East Second Team All Star

=== NEHC Player of the Year ===
Kara Violette, 2017 NEHC Player of the Year

=== NEHC Rookie of the Week ===
Julie Matthias, 2015 (Nov 2 & Dec 14)

Sam Girard, 2015 (Nov 9)

Danielle Doherty, 2015 (Nov 23)

=== Division I ===
==== Hockey East ====
- Millie Sirum, 2020–21 Hockey East Pro Ambitions All-Rookie Team
- Casey Borgiel, 2023 Hockey East Pro Ambitions All-Rookie Team

== Holy Cross Varsity Club Hall of Fame ==
The following is a list of people associated with the Holy Cross women's ice hockey program who were elected into the Holy Cross Varsity Club Hall of Fame (induction date in parentheses).

- Stacey Hochkins (2019), Forward, all-time leader in goals, assists, points, game-winning goals, power play goals and shorthanded goals.
- Peter Van Buskirk (2020, honorary), Head Coach

== Current roster ==
As of September 11, 2022.

No.	Nat.	Player	Class	Pos	Height	DoB	Hometown	Previous team
2		Vaia Graves	Junior	D	5' 8" (1.73 m)	2002-01-17	Plattsburgh, New York	North American Hockey Academy
4		Grace Johnson	Junior	D	5' 5" (1.65 m)	2001-08-18	Minnetonka, Minnesota	The Blake School
5		Bryn Saarela	Junior	F	5' 6" (1.68 m)	2001-06-20	Denver, Colorado	Williston Northampton School
6		Emilie Fortunato	Sophomore	D	5' 7" (1.7 m)	2002-05-22	Laval, Quebec	Stanstead College
7		Casey Borgiel	Freshman	D	5' 7" (1.7 m)	2004-06-14	Port Huron, Michigan	Little Caesars
8		Lane Lewis	Freshman	F	5' 8" (1.73 m)	2004-07-10	Winnetka, Illinois	Chicago Young Americans
10		Carly Beniek	Senior	F	5' 2" (1.57 m)	2001-05-31	Mound, Minnesota	Breck School
11		Alexia Moreau	Freshman	F	5' 4" (1.63 m)	2003-12-04	Louiseville, Quebec	Shattuck-Saint Mary's
12		Kailey Langefels	Senior	D	5' 5" (1.65 m)	2001-02-02	Minnetonka, Minnesota	Minnetonka High School
13		Mary Edmonds	Senior	F	5' 5" (1.65 m)	2000-11-30	Fairfield, Connecticut	Deerfield Academy
14		Carmen Elliott	Sophomore	D	5' 5" (1.65 m)	2003-04-09	Stephenville, Newfoundland and Labrador	Ridley College
16		Madison Michals	Sophomore	F	5' 7" (1.7 m)	2002-07-22	Needham, Massachusetts	Boston University
17		Darci Johal	Senior	F	5' 8" (1.73 m)	2001-08-29	Burnaby, British Columbia	North American Hockey Academy
18		Mackenzie King	Sophomore	F	5' 4" (1.63 m)	2002-11-07	Mt. Lebanon, Pennsylvania	Pittsburgh Penguins Elite
19		Sofia Smithson (C)	Senior	F	5' 5" (1.65 m)	2001-03-22	Windsor, Ontario	Mississauga Jr. Chiefs
20		Millie Sirum	Junior	F	5' 9" (1.75 m)	2000-11-02	Oslo, Norway	Kent School
21		Alexis Perry	Freshman	F	5' 5" (1.65 m)	2004-12-25	Brooklin, Ontario	Pittsburgh Penguins Elite
22		Lilly Feeney (C)	Junior	F	5' 3" (1.6 m)	2002-04-09	Foxborough, Massachusetts	Phillips Academy
23		Taylor Cantelon	Freshman	D	5' 6" (1.68 m)	2004-01-01	Oakville, Ontario	Etobicoke Jr. Dolphins
24		Lily Cataldo	Senior	F	5' 5" (1.65 m)	2000-11-22	Glenview, Illinois	Chicago Mission
25		Emma Min	Sophomore	D	5' 5" (1.65 m)	2003-09-05	London, Ontario	London Jr. Devilettes
26		Charlotte Sonntag	Freshman	F	5' 4" (1.63 m)	2004-07-19	Sun Valley, Idaho	Shattuck-Saint Mary's
27		Michela Lio	Sophomore	F	5' 5" (1.65 m)	2003-01-20	Toronto, Ontario	Durham West Jr. Lightning
29		Madison Beck	Junior	G	5' 3" (1.6 m)	2002-04-21	Lunenburg, Nova Scotia	St. Paul's School
30		Brooke Loranger	Freshman	G	5' 9" (1.75 m)	2004-01-01	Niagara-on-the-Lake, Ontario	Ridley College
31		Abigail Hornung	Freshman	G	5' 7" (1.7 m)	2003-10-22	Ashland, Massachusetts	Berkshire School
