= Jackie Barto =

American ice hockey player and coach

- Born: August 24, 1962 (age 63) West Newton, Massachusetts, U.S.
- Coached for: Ohio State Buckeyes; Providence Friars
- Coaching career: 1999–2011

Jacqueline M. Barto (née Gladu) (born August 24, 1962) is an American former ice hockey coach. She was the first coach for the Ohio State Buckeyes women's ice hockey team. At the time of her retirement in 2011, Barto had coached more than 500 games in her career and ranked eighth in career victories among NCAA Division I coaches. Barto's final record at OSU was 248–272–52, a .433 winning percentage.

Barto coached the Buckeyes from their inception in 1999 through 2011, winning 191 games during that span. During her tenure, she coached four Olympians, four All-Americans, five Patty Kazmaier Memorial Award Top 10 Finalists, and a WCHA Player of the Year. She also spent time as a coach for the United States women's national ice hockey team, winning a gold medal at the 2008 IIHF Women's World Championship.

== Early life ==
Barto was born and raised in West Newton, Massachusetts and learned to skate from her father Richard. She attended Newton North High School and was a Suburban League field hockey and softball all-star.

== Career ==
=== Playing career ===
While attending Providence, Barto was a multi-sport athlete. She recorded 113 goals and 87 assists for 200 points in ice hockey and graduated as field hockey's second all-time leading scorer. In recognition of her athletic accomplishments, Barto was named the 1981 Providence College Female Athlete of the Year in her freshman season. Barto also competed in softball and was selected for the 1984 All-New England and Northeast All-Region Team. The following year, she was again selected as Providence College Female Athlete of the Year. In her senior year, she scored the game-winning goal nine seconds into overtime to give the Lady Friars their first Eastern College Athletic Conference hockey title.

=== Coaching career ===
After graduating from Providence with a degree in business management, Barto was hired as an assistant coach for the Lady Friars' hockey, softball, and field hockey teams. During her time coaching the ice hockey team, she led the Lady Friars to a 64–51–8 record and helped them reach their fourth straight ECAC title. She also served as the head field hockey coach for 13 seasons, compiling a winning percentage of .652, and led their softball team for three years, earning a winning percentage of .603. In 1998, Barto left Providence to help launch the women's varsity hockey program at Ohio State University (OSU). In its first year, she was allowed 18 scholarships to recruit players.

In her first year as head coach of the Ohio State Buckeyes women's ice hockey team, Barto's squad included 19 freshmen, one sophomore and one junior. During their inaugural season, she led the team to an 8–26–3 record. The team improved the following season and defeated St. Cloud State University and Minnesota to advance to their first championship final in March 2001. Despite a poor showing during the first half of the season, Barto led the team to an 18-16-3 overall record, including 11-10-3 in the WCHA.

Prior to her fifth season as head coach of the Buckeyes, Barto was named an assistant coach for the 2003 U.S. Women's Under-22 Select Team. During the 2006–07 season, Barto led the team to their first 20 win season in program history, finishing the season with 20-13-4 record, and setting the record for the Buckeyes’ longest unbeaten streak at 10 games. After finishing fourth in the league standings, the Buckeyes swept Minnesota State before losing to Wisconsin in the WCHA semifinals. It was also during this season that Barto earned her 200th career win, becoming the seventh active coach in the NCAA to reach the milestone.

Following her most successful season, Barto was named head coach of the U.S. Women's Select and National Teams for the 2008 4 Nations Cup and 2008 IIHF Women's World Championship. In this role, she led Team USA to their second gold medal at the IIHF Women's World Championship and first since 2005.

After spending 12 years at OSY, Barto officially retired from her position as head coach in 2011, ending with a 248–272–52 record and .433 winning percentage. During her tenure, she coached four Olympians, four All-Americans, five Patty Kazmaier Memorial Award Top 10 Finalists, and a WCHA Player of the Year.

=== Post-retirement ===
In 2014, Barto worked at an after-school activities program for kindergartners and first-graders at Seaside Elementary School. She was later honored by the American Collegiate Hockey Association (ACHA) with the Women's Ice Hockey Founders Award as "a member of the hockey community or college coaching profession who has contributed to the overall growth and development of the sport of women’s ice hockey in the United States through their enthusiasm, passion and selflessness."

== See also ==
- List of college women's ice hockey career coaching wins leaders
