= Penn State Nittany Lions women's ice hockey =

- Current season
- University: Pennsylvania State University
- Conference: AHA
- Head coach: Jeff Kampersal; 7th season
- Arena: Pegula Ice Arena; University Park, Pennsylvania, U.S.
- Colors: Blue and white

NCAA tournament Frozen Four
- 2026

NCAA tournament appearances
- 2023, 2024, 2025, 2026

Conference tournament champions
- 2023, 2024, 2025, 2026

Conference regular season champions
- 2021, 2023, 2024, 2025, 2026

Penn State Nittany Lions women's ice hockey is a college ice hockey program that has represented Penn State University in National Collegiate Athletic Association (NCAA) Division I since the 2012–13 season. The Nittany Lions were members of College Hockey America (CHA) from their first season through the 2023–24 season, after which CHA merged with the Atlantic Hockey Association to form Atlantic Hockey America.

The program was preceded by a club team that competed at the American Collegiate Hockey Association (ACHA) Division 1 level, primarily as a member of Eastern Collegiate Women's Hockey League (ECWHL). Penn State plays its home games at Pegula Ice Arena in University Park, Pennsylvania.

== History ==
=== ACHA years ===
Penn State's first women's hockey team – a club team called the "Lady Icers" – began play in the 1996–97 season, after students Ellen Bradley and Kathy Beckford recruited players from around campus and Vinnie Scalamogna, the assistant manager of the Penn State Ice Pavilion (then the university's sole ice facility), as coach. The Lady Icers' first game, a 5–4 win over the Susquehanna Rockettes (an adult club team), took place on February 1, 1997. The team was intermittently successful over its 16 years of existence, winning six conference regular season or playoff titles and qualifying for the ACHA National Tournament six times, peaking with a third-place finish at the end of the 2001–02 season.

Penn State concluded its time in the ACHA in February 2012, with eventual NCAA leader Josh Brandwene as head coach. That season, the Lady Icers played a mixed schedule, featuring ACHA and ECWHL opponents as well as eleven games against NCAA Division I and Division III teams. PSU finished the year by claiming the ECWHL regular season title, but then losing to Rhode Island in the league's playoff championship game.

=== Move to NCAA ===
After years of speculation the program transitioned to the NCAA Division I level along with the PSU men's ice hockey team for the 2012–13 season. The move was made possible thanks to a Penn State-record $88 million (later increased to $102 million) donation, announced on September 17, 2010, from Terrence Pegula, a Penn State alumnus and billionaire hockey fan, and his wife Kim. The donation primarily paid for the completion of a new 5,782-seat, $89 million ice arena to replace the undersized and aging 1,350-seat Penn State Ice Pavilion, which was deemed inadequate for long-term NCAA play. Pegula Ice Arena opened in September 2013, after the Nittany Lions played their first NCAA season in the Ice Pavilion.

In May 2011 the university hired Brandwene as the first varsity women's hockey head coach. On June 21, 2011, former Lady Icers head coach Mo Stroemel and Gina Kearns joined Brandwene's staff as assistants. Kearns had been an assistant with the Neumann University Knights, coaching there from 2009 until 2011. In September 2011, Penn State was accepted into College Hockey America for the 2012–13 season, becoming the fifth member of the conference after Wayne State abruptly ended their women's hockey program, dropping league membership to only four teams for the 2011–12 season.

=== NCAA ===
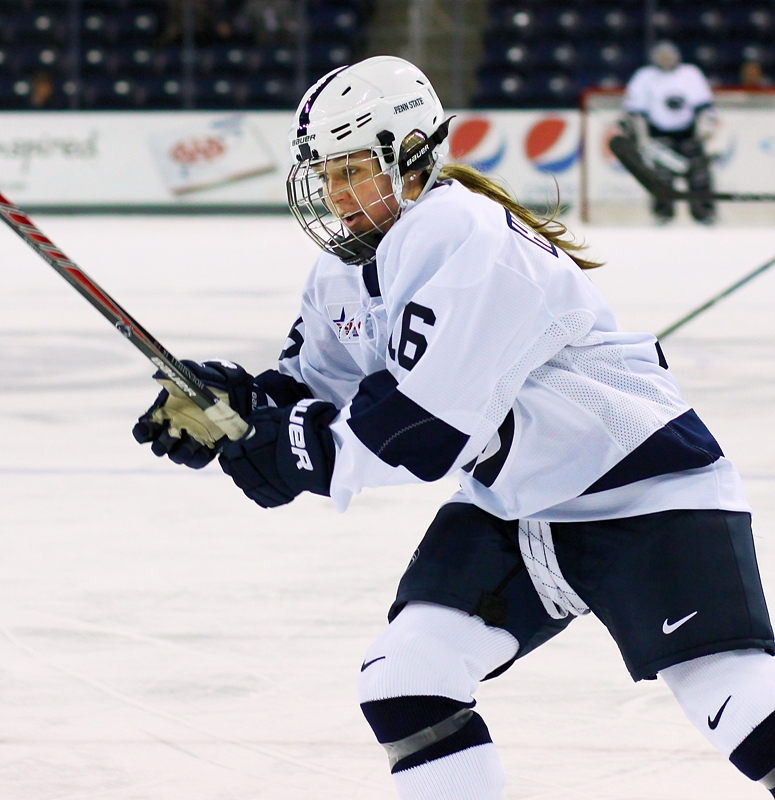
Hannah Hoenshell, Penn State's leading scorer in 2013–14

The Nittany Lions launched their NCAA era with a 5–3 victory over Vermont at Gutterson Fieldhouse on October 6, 2012, helped by a pair of goals each from Micayla Catanzariti and Shannon Yoxheimer. Behind a roster led by forward and captain Taylor Gross, forward Jenna Welch and goaltender Nicole Paniccia (each a transfer from the University of Connecticut), and featuring eight Lady Icers holdovers (including Gross) along with 17 freshmen, PSU climbed to 5–8–1 overall on November 17, 2012 with its first-ever CHA win, 3–2 over fellow former ACHA program Lindenwood. The Nittany Lions skidded the rest of the way through, managing only two wins (both against NCAA Division III Chatham University) over the final 21 games of the season, including a sweep by RIT in the first round of the CHA playoffs.

The 2013–14 season again began with a win at Vermont and a split in the team's first Pegula Ice Arena games, on October 18 and 19, 2013 against Union. However, despite eight ties or overtime losses and thanks largely to scoring just 1.36 times per game, the Nittany Lions regressed to four wins overall and were once again swept by RIT in the first round of the CHA playoffs.

In the 2014–15 season, PSU posted its first winning record (17–16–4), highest CHA standings position (tied for third) and first CHA playoff series win (against Lindenwood) before falling to Syracuse in the CHA semifinals, thanks largely to the Minnetonka, MN-native duo of Laura Bowman and Amy Petersen, who combined for 27 goals. One season highlight was a December 2014 sweep of then-No. 6 Mercyhurst, the Nittany Lions' first and second wins against a ranked team and against the perennially-powerful Lakers. However, the team slid slightly backwards in 2015–16, matching the previous season's CHA standings placement and playoff results (a first-round sweep of RIT followed by a triple-overtime loss to Syracuse in the semifinals) but finishing only 12–19–6 overall.

==== 2014 offseason controversy ====
A few weeks after the conclusion of the 2013–14 season, a group of thirteen players spoke with Penn State Associate Athletic Director Charmelle Green to "express their frustration with Brandwene and concerns about the future of the program." Seven of this group were subsequently cut from the team, including Jessica Desorcie, Darby Kern, Cara Mendelson, Brooke Meyer, Katie Murphy, Birdie Shaw and Madison Smiddy. Murphy was the most outspoken of the cuts, telling Penn State student newspaper The Daily Collegian that "[Brandwene] talked to us like we were children. Three or four weeks he would go without even looking at me or without even talking to me. He’s a bully. That’s the best word I can think of for him," and that "The girls don’t respect the coach because he hasn’t earned our respect at all. He’s been my coach for three years and I tried my hardest to respect him and I still don’t have the respect for him that I should have for a head coach because he’s not a good coach."

Over the days following Murphy's comments, others formerly involved with the program, including strength and conditioning coach Rob McLean as well as outgoing transfer players Katie Zinn and Taylor McGee also spoke critically of Brandwene.

==== 2016 offseason controversy ====
The program again found itself the subject of negative headlines in March 2016, as Murphy, Mendelson, Shaw and others told or retold their stories to The Daily Collegian. One of the chief allegations concerned the handling of the 2014 complaint, with Murphy and Shaw claiming that Green promised confidentiality to the group filing the complaint before subsequently burying the issue and turning their names over to Brandwene, who cut them – actions that would appear to be in violation of Penn State athletics guidelines. Several stories of emotional abuse were included as well. One anonymous former player said that Brandwene told her to lose weight in order to play more, while Shaw recounted an incident in which Brandwene physically knocked her stick from her hands while saying "don't worry, you won't be needing that today." Shaw also said that Brandwene ruined the sport for her, to the point where she wouldn't allow her kids to play.

As with the 2014 situation, others came forward in the following days, including 2011–12 ACHA team players Katie Vaughan, Ashton Schaffer and Abbey Dufoe. Vaughan said that "it became clear to me that this man has a destructive personality and he meant the team no well-being" while recalling a conversation involving Brandwene pressing her about personal issues. Both she and Schaffer detailed other instances of emotional manipulation that almost caused them to end decade-plus playing careers, while Dufoe flatly said that "no one should be treated like that." One father of an anonymous current player said that his daughter would transfer if Brandwene is retained as coach, and that "he has heard other parents say the same thing."

==== 2017 offseason coaching change ====
On April 19, 2017, Josh Brandwene retired from coaching, and on June 1, 2017, Penn State announced the hiring of longtime Princeton women's hockey head coach Jeff Kampersal to lead the Penn State women's hockey team beginning with the 2017–18 season.

== Season-by-season results ==
Won championship	Lost championship	Conference champions	League leader

Year	Coach	W	L	T	Conference	Conf. W	Conf. L	Conf. T	Finish	Conference Tournament	NCAA Tournament
2025–26	Jeff Kampersal	33	6	0	AHA	22	2	0	1st AHA	Won Semifinals vs. Syracuse (7–0, 2–1); Won Championship vs. Mercyhurst (3–2)	Won Quarterfinals vs. Connecticut (3–0); Lost Frozen Four vs. Wisconsin (3–4 OT)
2024–25	Jeff Kampersal	31	6	1	AHA	19	1	0	1st AHA	Won Semifinals vs. RIT (3-2, 4–0); Won Championship vs. Mercyhurst (4–1)	Lost First Round vs. St. Lawrence (4-1)
2023–24	Jeff Kampersal	22	12	3	CHA	14	4	2	1st CHA	Won Semifinals vs. RIT (2–1, 4–0); Won Championship vs. Mercyhurst (1–0)	Lost First Round vs. St. Lawrence (1-0 (OT))
2022–23	Jeff Kampersal	26	8	2	CHA	12	1	1	1st CHA	Won Semifinals vs. Lindenwood (4–1, 7–1); Won Championship vs. Mercyhurst (2–1 (OT))	Lost First Round vs. Quinnipiac (3–2 (3OT))
2021–22	Jeff Kampersal	18	10	5	CHA	8	3	3	2nd CHA	Lost Semifinals vs. Mercyhurst (4–2)	Did not qualify
2020–21	Jeff Kampersal	16	3	2	CHA	16	2	2	1st CHA	Lost Semifinals vs. Syracuse (3–2)	Did not qualify
2019–20	Jeff Kampersal	13	15	8	CHA	7	8	5	4th CHA	Won Quarterfinals vs. RIT (4–1); Lost Semifinals vs. Mercyhurst (4–1)	Did not qualify
2018–19	Jeff Kampersal	13	14	9	CHA	6	9	5	5th CHA	Won Quarterfinals vs. RIT (4–1); Lost Semifinals vs. Robert Morris (2–1)	Did not qualify
2017–18	Jeff Kampersal	10	15	11	CHA	6	7	7	4th CHA	Won Quarterfinals vs. Lindenwood (2–1); Lost Semifinals vs. Robert Morris (7–2)	Did not qualify
2016–17	Dean Jackson	9	21	5	CHA	8	10	2	4th CHA	Lost Quarterfinals vs. RIT (2–1)	Did not qualify
2015–16	Josh Brandwene	12	19	6	CHA	6	8	6	3rd CHA	Won Quarterfinals vs. RIT (2–0, 3–2); Lost Semifinals vs. Syracuse (3–2 (3OT))	Did not qualify
2014–15	Josh Brandwene	17	16	4	CHA	9	9	2	4th CHA	Won Quarterfinals vs. Lindenwood (1–0, 3–1); Lost Semifinals vs. Syracuse (2–0)	Did not qualify
2013–14	Josh Brandwene	4	29	3	CHA	1	18	1	6th CHA	Lost Quarterfinals vs. RIT (3–2 (OT), 3–0)	Did not qualify
2012–13	Josh Brandwene	7	26	2	CHA	1	17	2	6th CHA	Lost Quarterfinals vs. RIT (1–0, 3–2 (OT))	Did not qualify

== All-time scoring leader ==
- Tessa Janecke, 59 (G), 86 (A), 145 (P)

== Season by season goaltending leaders ==
(Minimum 60 minutes played)

Year	Wins	Goals Against Average	Save Percentage	Shutouts
2012–13	Nicole Paniccia (6)	Celine Whitlinger (2.96)	Celine Whitlinger (0.938)	None
2013–14	Celine Whitlinger (3)	Nicole Paniccia (3.44)	Celine Whitlinger (0.913)	None

== Awards and honors ==
- Josie Bothun, 2020–21 CHA Goaltender of the Year
- Natalie Heising, 2020–21 CHA Individual Sportsmanship Award
- Jeff Kampersal, 2020–21 CHA Coach of the Year
- Kiara Zanon, 2020–21 CHA Rookie of the Year
- Kiara Zanon, 2020–21 CHA Player of the Year
- Kiara Zanon, 2020–21 HCA National Rookie of the Year
- Kiara Zanon, 2020–21 Second Team CCM/AHCA All-American
- Kiara Zanon, 2020–21 USCHO National All-Rookie Team
- Jeff Kampersal, 2022–23 CHA Coach of the Year
- Kiara Zanon, 2022–23 CHA Player of the Year
- Tessa Janecke, 2022–23 CHA Rookie of the Year
- Tessa Janecke, 2022–23 USCHO Co-Rookie of the Year
- Tessa Janecke, 2022–23 HCA National Rookie of the Year
- Tessa Janecke, 2022–23 USCHO National All-Rookie Team
- Tessa Janecke, 2023–24 CHA Player of the Year
- Tessa Janecke, 2023–24 CHA Forward of the Year
- Tessa Janecke, 2024–25 AHA Player of the Year
- Tessa Janecke, 2023–24 AHA Forward of the Year
- Katie DeSa, 2024–25 AHA Goalie of the Year
- Kendall Butze, 2024–25 AHA Defenseman of the Year
- Katie DeSa, 2025–26 AHA Goalie of the Year
- Kendall Butze, 2025–26 AHA Defenseman of the Year

=== Season award winners ===
- Penn State, 2014–15 CHA Team Sportsmanship Award

Award	Player (Season)
CHA All-First Team	Tessa Janecke (2022–23, 2023–24)
CHA All-Second Team	Brianna Brooks (2023–24), Maggie MacEachern (2023–24), Laura Bowman (2014–15)
CHA All-Rookie Team	Shannon Yoxheimer (2012–13), Laura Bowman (2013–14), Hannah Ehresmann and Bella Sutton (2014–15)
CHA Individual Sportsmanship Award	Taylor Gross (2013–14)
CHA Student-Athletes of the Year	Laura Bowman (2013–14), Lindsay Reihl (2013–14)
CHA All-Academic Team	Jeanette Bateman (2012–13, 2013–14), Kate Christoffersen (2012–13), Hannah Hoenshell (2012–13, 2013–14), Jill Holdcroft (2012–13, 2013–14), Paige Jahnke (2012–13, 2013–14), Darby Kern (2012–13, 2013–14), Emily Laurenzi (2012–13), Brooke Meyer (2012–13), Kendra Rasmussen (2012–13, 2013–14), Lindsay Reihl (2012–13, 2013–14), Stephanie Walkom (2012–13), Tess Weaver (2012–13), Jenna Welch (2012–13, 2013–14), Sarah Wilkie (2012–13, 2013–14), Katie Zinn (2012–13), Laura Bowman (2013–14), Taylor Gross (2013–14), Cara Mendelson (2013–14), Sarah Nielsen (2013–14), Amy Petersen (2013–14), Kelly Seward (2013–14), Madison Smiddy (2013–14), Celine Whitlinger (2013–14), Shannon Yoxheimer (2013–14)
Academic All-Big Ten Selections	Kate Christoffersen (2012–13), Jessica Desorcie (2012–13), Taylor Gross (2012–13, 2013–14), Cara Mendelson (2012–13), Lindsay Reihl (2012–13, 2013–14), Tess Weaver (2012–13, 2013–14), Jeanette Bateman (2013–14), Hannah Hoenshell (2013–14), Jill Holdcroft (2013–14), Paige Jahnke (2013–14), Emily Laurenzi (2013–14), Kendra Rasmussen (2013–14), Stephanie Walkom (2013–14), Jenna Welch (2013–14), Celine Whitlinger (2013–14), Sarah Wilkie (2013–14)

== Olympians ==
Year	Country	Player	Result
2022	Sweden	Jessica Adolfsson	8th
2026	Italy	Matilde Fantin	8th
2026	Sweden	Jessica Adolfsson	4th
2026	Sweden	Nicole Hall	4th
2026	United States	Tessa Janecke	Gold

== Current roster ==
As of September 19, 2025.

No.	Nat.	Player	Class	Pos	Height	DoB	Hometown	Previous team
2	(United States)	Grace Tullock	Sophomore	D	5' 9" (1.75 m)	2006-04-24	Burnt Hills, New York	North American Hockey Academy
7	(Canada)	Taya MacDonald	Sophomore	D	5' 11" (1.8 m)	2005-07-13	London, Ontario	Rink HA Kelowna Prep
8	(Canada)	Grace Outwater	Sophomore	F	5' 8" (1.73 m)	2006-10-10	Picton, Ontario	Ottawa Lady Jr. Sens
9	(United States)	Shelby Shane	Freshman	D	5' 4" (1.63 m)	2007-04-02	Kutztown, Pennsylvania	Philadelphia Jr. Flyers
10	(United States)	Leah Stecker (A)	Senior	D	5' 9" (1.75 m)	2003-11-00	Randolph, New Jersey	Philadelphia Jr. Flyers
11	(Canada)	Abby Stonehouse	Sophomore	F	5' 4" (1.63 m)	2006-03-30	Blenheim, Ontario	Waterloo Ravens
12	(United States)	McKenna Walsh	Sophomore	F	5' 1" (1.55 m)	2006-06-07	Oswego, Illinois	Chicago Mission
15	(United States)	Tessa Janecke (C)	Senior	F	5' 8" (1.73 m)	2004-05-12	Orangeville, Illinois	North America Hockey Academy
17	(United States)	Kendall Butze (A)	Senior	D	5' 3" (1.6 m)	2003-08-03	Cleveland, Ohio	Bishop Kearney Selects;
19	(Canada)	Mya Vaslet (A)	Graduate	F	5' 9" (1.75 m)	2003-04-06	Stittsville, Ontario	Nepean Jr Wildcats
20	(Italy)	Matilde Fantin	Freshman	F	5' 7" (1.7 m)	2007-01-01	Como, Italy	HC Lugano
21	(Sweden)	Nicole Hall	Sophomore	F	5' 5" (1.65 m)	2004-03-24	Stockholm, Sweden	Djurgarden
22	(United States)	Katelyn Roberts (A)	Senior	F	5' 7" (1.7 m)	2004-04-12	Chanhassen, Minnesota	Chanhassen High School
24	(Canada)	Taylor Lum	Graduate	F	5' 3" (1.6 m)	2002-04-01	Etobicoke, Ontario	St. Lawrence
25	(United States)	Sophie Morrow	Freshman	D	5' 11" (1.8 m)	2007-05-01	Darien, Connecticut	Shattuck-Saint Mary's
26	(United States)	Maddy Christian (A)	Senior	F	5' 7" (1.7 m)	2003-12-24	Elk River, Minnesota	Elk River High School
27	(Canada)	Danica Maynard	Freshman	D	5' 2" (1.57 m)	2007-03-19	Lake Country, British Columbia	Rink HA Kelowna Prep
28	(United States)	Mikah Keller	Freshman	F	5' 7" (1.7 m)	2006-03-19	Mosinee, Wisconsin	North American Hockey Academy
32	(United States)	Lauren Hernick	Freshman	G	5' 3" (1.6 m)	2007-00-00	Frankenmuth, Michigan	Philadelphia Jr. Flyers
35	(United States)	Katie DeSa	Senior	G	5' 8" (1.73 m)	2004-01-21	Pawcatuck, Connecticut	Boston Jr. Eagles
45	(Canada)	Maddy Campbell	Freshman	G	5' 6" (1.68 m)	2007-06-30	Courtice, Ontario	Durham West

== See also ==
- Penn State Nittany Lions men's ice hockey
- Penn State Women's Ice Hockey Club
- List of College women's ice hockey coaches with 250 wins
