= Filion =

Filion is a surname. Notable people with the surname include:

- Amaury Filion (born 1981), Dominican basketballer
- Gérard Filion (1909–2005), Canadian businessman and journalist
- Hervé Filion (1940–2017), Canadian harness racing driver
- Jean Filion (born 1951), Canadian politician
- John Filion (born 1950), Toronto city councillor
- Louise Filion (born 1945), Canadian biogeographer
- Maurice Filion (1932–2017), Canadian ice hockey coach
- Richard Filion, Canadian administrator
- Roseline Filion (born 1987), Canadian diver

== See also ==
- Fillion, surname
- Fillon (surname)
