= 2019–20 Clarkson Golden Knights women's ice hockey season =

- Conference: ECAC Hockey
- Home ice: Cheel Arena

Record
- Overall: 25-6-6
- Conference: 14-4-4
- Home: 15-1-2
- Road: 8-4-4
- Neutral: 2-1-0

Coaches and captains
- Head coach: Matt Desrosiers
- Captain: Ella Shelton
- Alternate captain(s): Taylor Turnquist; Meaghan Hector

The Clarkson Golden Knights represented Clarkson University in ECAC women's ice hockey during the 2019–20 NCAA Division I women's ice hockey season. Qualifying for the 2020 NCAA National Collegiate Women's Ice Hockey Tournament, the event was cancelled due to the COVID-19 pandemic.

== Offseason ==
=== Recruiting ===
Player	Position	Nationality	Notes
Stephanie Markowski	D	Canada	Enjoyed back-to-back championships with Pursuit of Excellence in the Canadian Sport School Hockey League
Gabrielle David	F	Canada	Two-sport star at Cegep Limoilou, playing for soccer team. Captured the Quebec-Ontario Soccer Cup
Lauren Bernard	D	United States	Played for USA at the 2019 IIHF U18-World Championships
Emily Wisnewski	D	United States	Two-year captain with Wayzata High School
Brooke McQuigge	F	Canada	Captured a bronze medal with Canada at the 2018 IIHF U18-World Championships

== Regular season ==
=== Standings ===
- 2019–20 ECAC Hockey standings
  	Conference							Overall					
  	GP	W	L	T	PTS	GF	GA	GP	W	L	T	GF	GA
  #1 Cornell	22	19	0	3	41	84	16	31	27	1	3	121	28
  #6 Princeton	22	17	4	1	35	77	40	31	24	6	1	114	54
  #7 Clarkson	22	14	4	4	32	63	29	36	25	5	6	110	50
  Harvard	22	15	6	1	31	69	53	32	18	13	1	93	85
  Yale	22	13	9	0	26	53	49	32	17	15	0	86	81
  Colgate	22	11	8	3	25	71	43	38	17	15	6	110	84
  #10 Quinnipiac	22	11	9	2	24	63	43	37	20	14	3	104	70
  St. Lawrence	22	8	10	4	20	34	43	36	13	16	7	73	83
  Union	22	5	14	3	13	39	74	34	5	24	5	52	115
  Dartmouth	22	4	15	3	11	36	70	29	7	19	3	52	91
  Brown	22	2	18	2	6	24	85	29	3	23	3	33	119
  RPI	22	0	22	0	0	14	82	34	0	33	1	21	122
  Championship: March 10, 2020 † indicates conference regular season champion; * indicates conference tournament champion Rankings: USCHO.com

=== Schedule ===
Date	Opponent^{#}	Rank^{#}	Site	Decision	Result	Record
Regular Season
September 27	at Syracuse Orange		Syracuse, New York	Marie-Pier Coulombe (W, 1)	W 4-3	1-0-0 (0-0-0)
September 28	Syracuse Orange		Cheel Arena • Potsdam, New York	Amanda Zeglen (W, 1)	W 5-1	2-0-0 (0-0-0)
*Non-conference game. ^{#}Rankings from USCHO.com Poll.

== Roster ==
=== 2019-20 Golden Knights ===
Current as of 2019–20 season

No.	Nat.	Player	Class	Pos	Height	DoB	Hometown	Previous team
4		Avery Mitchell	Junior	D	5' 4" (1.63 m)	1999-08-30	Pickering, Ontario	Toronto Jr. Aeros
6		Stephanie Markowski	Freshman	D	5' 8" (1.73 m)	2001-08-24	Edmonton, Alberta	Pursuit of Excellence
7		Élizabeth Giguère	Junior	F	5' 10" (1.78 m)	1997-05-08	Quebec, Quebec	Limoilou Titans (RSEQ)
8		Gabrielle David	Freshman	F	5' 4" (1.63 m)	1999-06-22	Drummondville, Quebec	Limoilou Titans (RSEQ)
9		Tia Stoddard	Junior	F	5' 0" (1.52 m)	1998-06-09	La Mesa, California	Nepean Jr. Wildcats
10		Michaela Pejzlová	Senior	F	5' 6" (1.68 m)	1997-04-06	Pardubice, Czech Republic	Stanstead Spartans
11		Ella Shelton (C)	Senior	F	5' 8" (1.73 m)	1998-01-19	Ingersoll, Ontario	London Devilettes (PWHL)
12		Katherine Beaumier	Senior	F	5' 4" (1.63 m)	1998-02-03	Richland, Washington	Anaheim Lady Ducks (PWHL)
14		Morgan Helgeson	Sophomore	F	5' 6" (1.68 m)	1999-05-05	Lake Elmo, Minnesota	Hill-Murray School
16		Caitrin Lonergan (A)	Senior	F	5' 6" (1.68 m)	1997-09-10	Roslindale, Massachusetts	Boston College
17		Taylor Turnquist	Senior	D	5' 5" (1.65 m)	1997-08-14	Blaine, Minnesota	Spring Lake Park HS
18		Meaghan Hector (A)	Junior	D	5' 6" (1.68 m)	1999-03-24	Georgetown, Ontario	Oakville Jr. Hornets
19		Lauren Bernard	Freshman	D	5' 7" (1.7 m)	2001-07-15	Madison, Ohio	Selects Academy
20		Kristy Pidgeon	Junior	F	5' 10" (1.78 m)	1999-12-16	Ingleside, Ontario	Nepean Jr. Wildcats
22		Emily Wisnewski	Freshman	D	5' 9" (1.75 m)	2000-09-05	Plymouth, Minnesota	Wayzata Trojans
23		Miranda Gaudet	Sophomore	F	5' 7" (1.7 m)	1999-12-21	West Kelowna, British Columbia	Okanagan Hockey Academy
24		Taylor Sawka	Sophomore	F	5' 5" (1.65 m)	1999-02-26	Cochrane, Alberta	Nepean Jr. Wildcats
25		Ryhen McGill	Graduate	F	5' 8" (1.73 m)	1997-10-28	Whitby, Ontario	Whitby Jr. Wolves
26		Brooke McQuigge	Freshman	F	5' 8" (1.73 m)	2000-06-09	Bowmanville, Ontario	Whitby Jr. Wolves
27		Kayla Braley		F	5' 3" (1.6 m)		Black River, New York
29		Kayla Friesen	Senior	F	5' 5" (1.65 m)	1998-03-05	Winnipeg, Manitoba	St. Cloud State
30		Marie Dedert	Freshman	G	5' 7" (1.7 m)	1996-05-19	Milwaukee, Wisconsin	Selects Academy
33		Marie-Pier Coulombe	Sophomore	G	5' 5" (1.65 m)	1998-04-26	Carignan, Quebec	Limoilou Titans (RSEQ)
37		Amanda Zeglen	Junior	G	5' 5" (1.65 m)	1999-02-15	Calgary, Alberta	Ohio State University

== Awards and honors ==
- Gabrielle David, ECAC Hockey Rookie of the Week (Clarkson) (awarded October 21, 2019)
- Elizabeth Giguere, 2019-20 ECAC Hockey Player of the Year
- Elizabeth Giguere, 2019-20 ECAC Hockey Best Forward
- Elizabeth Giguere, 2019-20 CCM/AHCA Hockey First Team All-American
- Elizabeth Giguere, 2019-20 Patty Kazmaier Award

=== ECAC Hockey All-Stars ===
- Elizabeth Giguere, 2019-20 ECAC Hockey First Team All-League
- Ella Shelton, 2019-20 ECAC Hockey First Team All-League
