= Fillon (disambiguation) =

François Fillon is a French retired politician.

Fillon may also refer to:

- Fillon (surname)
- Fillon law, 2005, a French education reform law

== See also ==
- Fillion (disambiguation)
