= RSEQ women's ice hockey =

Canadian provincial college ice hockey league

Hockey collégial féminin RSEQ
- Association: Canadian Collegiate Athletic Association
- Sport: Ice hockey
- Founded: 1999
- Organising body: Réseau du sport étudiant du Québec
- Divisions: 2
- No. of teams: 12 (6 per division)
- Region: Quebec, Canada
- Most recent champions: D1: Cégep Limoilou Titans; D2: Cégep Édouard-Montpetit Lynx
- Most titles: Cégep Limoilou Titans (9)
- Website: collegial.rseqhockey.com

Hockey collégial féminin RSEQ (lit. 'RSEQ women's college [ice] hockey') is the women's ice hockey league for college teams in Quebec, Canada. The league is sanctioned by Hockey Quebec, the Réseau du sport étudiant du Québec (RSEQ), and the Canadian Collegiate Athletic Association (CCAA/ACSC). It comprises twelve teams between two levels of competition, called Division 1 (D1) and Division 2 (D2). Hockey collégial féminin RSEQ is considered the highest level of young women's ice hockey in the Quebec provincial system. As developmental league, Hockey collégial féminin RSEQ is the first step for many players pursuing university ice hockey careers in Canada and the United States.

The league was established in 1999 as the Ligue de hockey féminin collégial AA. It was renamed when the RSEQ changed its naming structures in autumn 2011.

== History ==
Prior to the creation of the league, some college teams played with university teams in the women's hockey league of the Quebec Students Sports Federation (QSSF; rebranded as RSEQ in 2010). The Canadian Interuniversity Athletic Union (CIAU; renamed Canadian Interuniversity Sport (CIS) in 2001 and known as U Sports since 2016) organized the first national title for women's ice hockey at the end of the 1997–98 CIAU season and two Québécois college teams participated at the tournament: the Saint-Laurent Patriotes and the Dynamiques of Collège Jean-de-Brébeuf.

The Ligue de hockey féminin collégial AA was founded in 1999. Nine teams participated in the inaugural season, 1999–2000, and the Patriotes du collège St-Laurent won the Playoff Championship title.

In 2020, the league was restructured into two divisions of six teams each with the aim of improving the level of competition by concentrating the best college players in Division 1, while continuing to provide an option for other players via Division 2.

== Teams ==
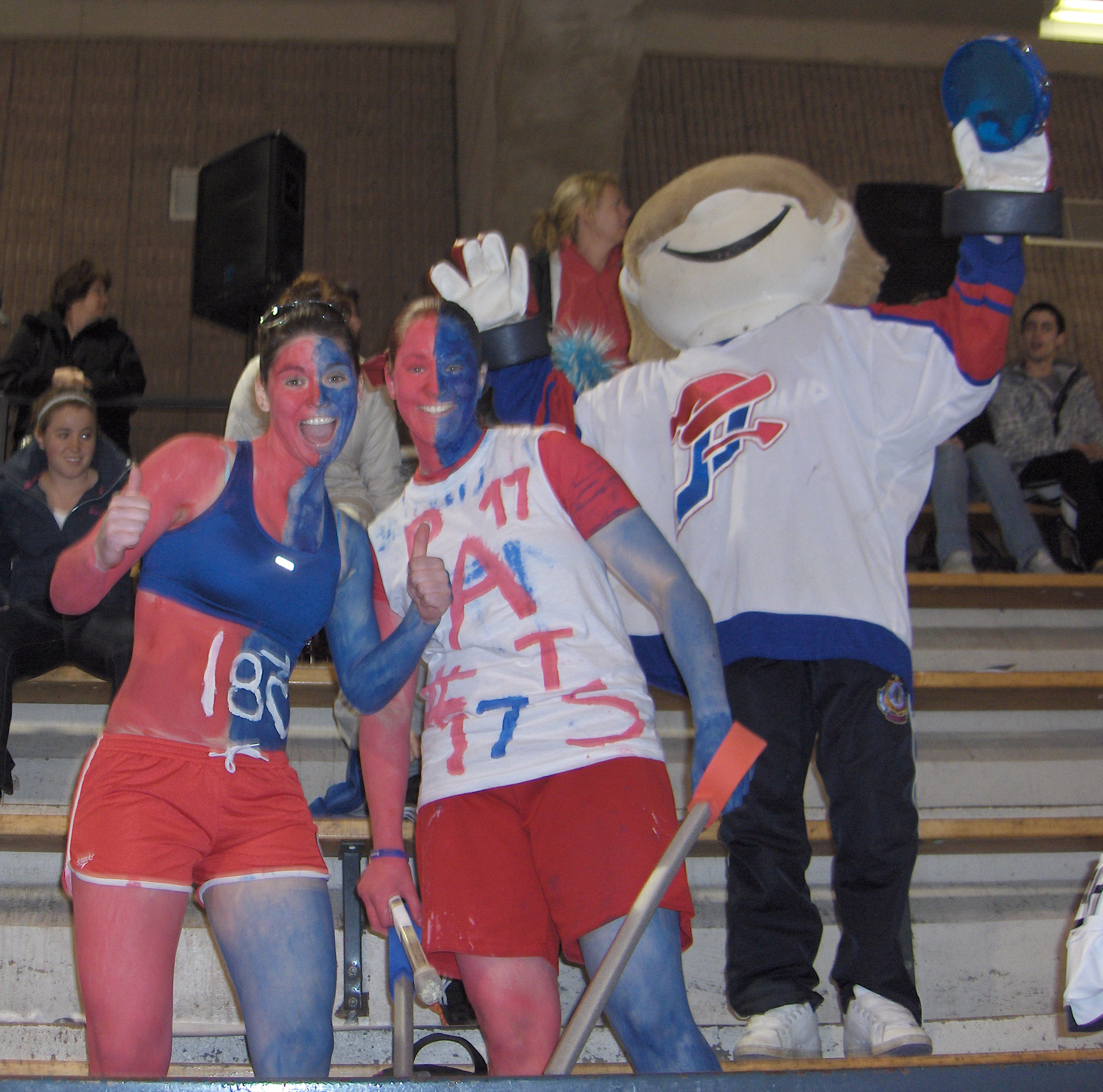
Supporters of Patriotes du Cégep St-Laurent

=== 2025–26 Division 1 teams ===
Six teams participated in the 2025–26 season of the Collégial Féminin D1:

- Blues of Dawson College
- Boomerang of Cégep André-Laurendeau
- Cougars of Champlain College Lennoxville
- Islanders of John Abbott College
- Patriotes of Cégep de Saint-Laurent
- Titans of Cégep Limoilou

=== 2025–26 Division 2 teams ===
Six teams participated in the 2025–26 season of the Collégial Féminin D2:

- Diablos of Cégep de Trois-Rivières
- Filons of Cégep de Thetford
- Hurricanes of Heritage College
- Lynx of Cégep Édouard-Montpetit
- Pionnières of Cégep de Rimouski
- Voltigeurs of Cégep de Drummondville

=== Former teams ===
- Cheminots of Cégep de Saint-Jérôme, team dissolved in 2012
- Dragons of Collège Laflèche, team dissolved in 2013
- Dynamiques of Collège Jean-de-Brébeuf, team dissolved in 2004
- Faucons of Cégep de Lévis-Lauzon, team dissolved in 2010
- Nordiques of Collège Lionel-Groulx, team dissolved in 2020
- Trappeurs of Cégep Marie-Victorin, team dissolved in 2008

== Regular season champions ==
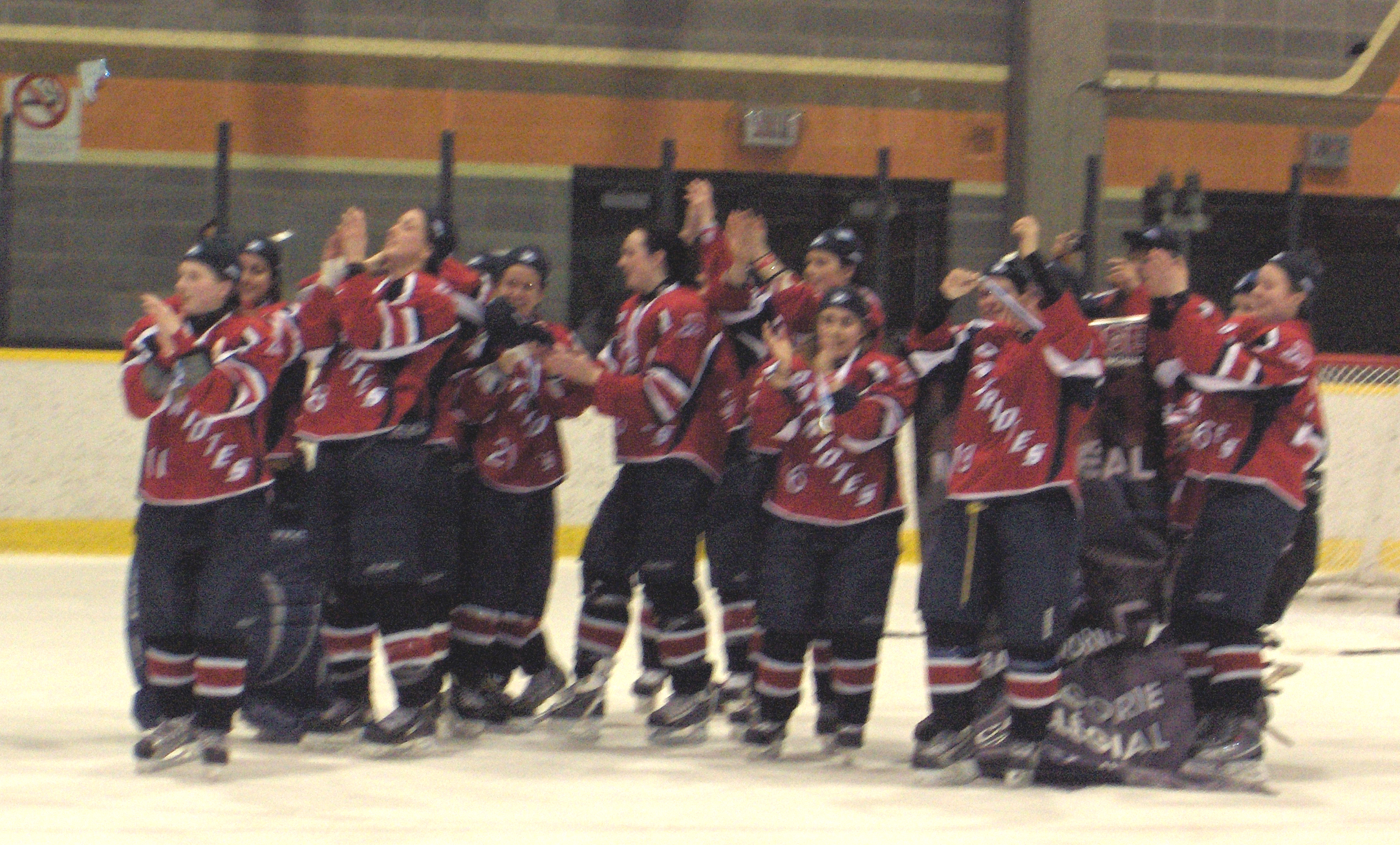
Champion 2011: Patriotes du Cégep St-Laurent

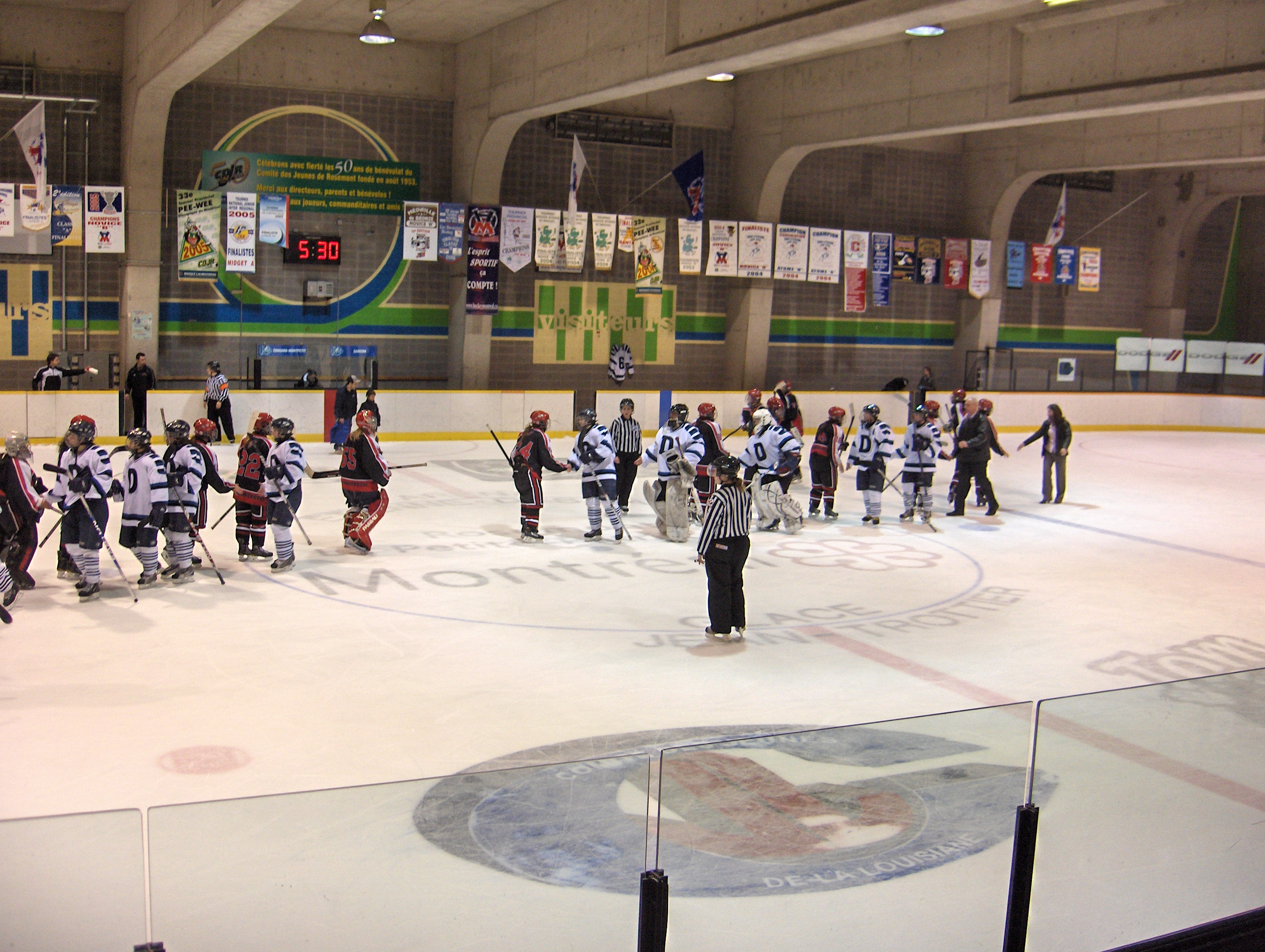
The League encourages competition with a sense of fair-play

The team that finishes first in the standings wins the regular season title.

- 2011-12 – Titans du Cégep Limoilou
- 2010-11 – Lynx du Collège Édouard-Montpetit
- 2009-10 – Lynx du Collège Édouard-Montpetit
- 2008-09 – Dawson College Blues
- 2007-08 – Cheminots du Cégep St-Jérôme
- 2006-07 – Dawson College Blues
- 2005-06 – Cheminots du Cégep du St-Jérôme
- 2004-05 – Patriotes du Cégep St-Laurent
- 2003-04 – not available
- 2002-03 – not available
- 2001-02 – Titans du Cégep Limoilou
- 2000-01 – not available
- 1999-2000 – Patriotes du Cégep St-Laurent

== Championship playoff ==
Following the regular season, a playoff is held to determine the Collégial women's champion in Quebec. A list of collégial winners includes (winner is in bold):

=== Playoff 2010-11 ===
==== The semi-finals and the finals was presented at the Centre Étienne Desmarteau ====
Playoff	Date	Time	Teams	Attendance
Semi-final	April 2	3:30 pm	Lynx Édouard-Montpetit 4-0 Dawson Blues	450 supporters
Semi-Final	April 2	5:30pm	Patriotes St-Laurent 2-1 (wins in shootout) Titans Limoilou	400 supporters
Final Bronze Medal	April 3	12:30 noon	Titans Limoilou 2-0 Dawson Blues	280 supporters
Final Gold Medal	April 3	3:00 pm	Patriotes St-Laurent 5-2 Lynx Édouard-Montpetit	420 supporters

winner: Patriotes du Cégep St-Laurent

=== Playoff 2009-10 ===
==== Semi-finals and Championship Final game 2010 ====
Playoff	Date	Teams
Semi-Final	April 3	Cheminots Saint-Jérôme 2–4 Lynx Édouard-Montpetit
Semi-final	April 3	Titans Limoilou 3–4 Dragons Laflèche
Final Bronze Medal	April 4	Cheminots Saint-Jérôme 2–1 Titans Limoilou
Final Gold Medal	April 4	Dragons Laflèche 5–6 Lynx Édouard-Montpetit

winner: Lynx du Collège Édouard-Montpetit

=== Playoffs 2008-09 ===
==== Semi-finals and Championship Final game ====
Playoff	Date	Teams
Semi-Final	April 11	Dawson Blues 6-2 Titans Limoilou
Semi-final	April 11	Lynx Édouard-Montpetit 7-1 Dragons Laflèche
Final Bronze Medal	April 12	Titans Limoilou 4–0 Dragons Laflèche
Final Gold Medal	April 12	Lynx Édouard-Montpetit 3–2 (wins in shootout) Dawson Blues

winner:Lynx du Collège Édouard-Montpetit

=== Playoffs 2007-08 ===
==== Championship final games ====
Playoff	Date	Teams
Final Gold Medal	April 4	Dawson Blues 3–8 Cheminots St-Jérôme
Final Gold Medal	April 11	Cheminots St-Jérôme 6-2 Dawson Blues

winner:Cheminots du Cégep St-Jérôme

=== Playoffs 2006-07 ===
==== Championship final games ====
Playoff	Date	Teams
Final Gold Medal	April 5	Cheminots St-Jérôme 1–2 Dawson Blues
Final Gold Medal	April 10	Dawson Blues 3–2 Cheminots St-Jérôme

winner:Dawson Blues

=== Playoffs 2005-06 ===
==== Championship final games ====
Playoff	Date	Teams
Final Gold Medal	March 31	Patriotes St-Laurent 1–2 Cheminots St-Jérôme
Final Gold Medal	April 2	Cheminots St-Jérôme 6–2 Patriotes St-Laurent

winner:Cheminots du cégep St-Jérôme

=== Playoffs 2004-2005 ===
==== Championship final game ====
Playoff	Date	Teams
Final Gold Medal	April 2	Dragons Laflèche 0-5 Cheminots St-Jérôme
Final Gold Medal	April 8	Cheminots St-Jérôme 4-2 Dragons Laflèche

winner:Cheminots du cégep St-Jérôme

- Playoff 2003-04 – Non-available
- Playoff 2002-03 – Non-available
- Playoff 2001-02 – Titans du Cégep Limoilou
- Playoff 2000-01 – Non-available
- Playoff 1999-2000 – **Patriotes du Collège St-Laurent**

== International matches ==
- August 30, 2010 – Norway women national team vs Dragons du Collège Laflèche
- August 28 and 29, 2010 – Norway women national team vs Titans du Cégep Limoilou

== Scoring leaders ==
Season	Player/Team	GP	Goal	Assist	Pts
2011-12	Carol-ann Upshall, Dragons du Collège Laflèche	21	19	17	36
2010-11	Ariane Barker, Lynx du Collège Édouard-Montpetit	21	32	26	58
2009-10	Mélodie Daoust, Lynx du Collège Édouard-Montpetit	13	24	31	55
2008-09	Marie-Philip Poulin, Dawson Blues	15	29	29	58

Individual statistics are not available for the other seasons.

== Goaltending Leaders ==
Season	Player/Team	GP	W	L	SO	GAA
2011-12	Maude Rousseau, Titans du Cégep Limoilou	18	7	1	3	1.00
2010-11	Frédérique Desmarais, Lynx du Collège Édouard-Montpetit	12	9	1	1	1.35
2009-10	Roxanne Douville, Lynx du Collège Édouard-Montpetit	21	15	1	1	1.23
2008-09	Emy Côte, Dawson Blues	23	10	0	0	0.89
2008-09	Joanie Plamondon, Dawson Blues	23	13	0	0	0.92

Individual statistics are not available for the other seasons.

== Awards and honors ==
Season 2011-12

- Player of the Year Award:
- Rookie of the Year Award:
- Fair-play Award:

Season 2010-11

- Player of the Year Award: Mélodie Daoust, Lynx du Collège Édouard-Montpetit.
- Rookie of the Year Award: Cassandra Poudrier, Dawson Blues.
- Fair-play Award: Emmanuelle Dumont, Dragons du Collège Laflèche

Season 2009-10

- Player of the Year Award: Josianne Legault, Dragons du Collège Laflèche
- Rookie of the Year Award: Mélodie Daoust, Lynx du Édouard-Montpetit
- Fair-play Award: Emmanuelle Dumont, Dragons du Collège Laflèche

Season 2008-09

- Player of the Year Award: Marie-Philip Poulin, Dawson Blues
- Rookie of the Year Award: Marie-Philip Poulin, Dawson Blues
- Fair-play Award: Katia Clément-Heydra, Lynx du Collège Édouard-Montpetit

Awards and individual honors are not available for the other seasons.

== Notable players ==
- Catherine Ward, (Dawson Blues) – McGill Martlets and Canada National women Team.
- Marie-Philip Poulin, (Dawson Blues) – Canada National women Team.
- Ann-Sophie Bettez, (Dawson Blues) – McGill Martlets and Canada's national women's under-22 team.
- Lauriane Rougeau, (Cheminots du Cegep St-Jérôme and Dawson Blues) – Montreal Stars (CWHL), Canada's National women's team Under-18 team and Canada's national women's under-22 team.
- Emmanuelle Blais, (Dawson Blues) – Montreal Stars (CWHL).
- Marie-Andrée Leclerc-Auger, (Cheminots du Cegep St-Jérôme) – McGill Martlets and Montreal Carabins
- Kelly Sudia, (John Abbott Islanders) – Concordia Stingers, Montreal Stars (CWHL).
- Donna Ringrose, (John Abbott Islanders) – Concordia Stingers, Montreal Stars (CWHL).
- Tawnya Danis, (John Abbott Islanders) – Concordia Stingers, Montreal Stars (CWHL).
- Josée-Ann Deschênes, (Cheminots du Cegep St-Jérôme) – Montreal Carabins and Montreal Stars (CWHL).
- Mélodie Daoust, (Lynx du College Edouard-Montpetit) – McGill Martlets Canada's National women's team Under-18 team.
- Roxanne Douville, (Lynx du Collège Édouard-Montpetit) – Vermont Catamounts and Canada's national women's under-22 team.
- Katia Clément-Heydra (Lynx du Collège Édouard-Montpetit), McGill Martlets
- Janique Duval (Lynx du Collège Édouard-Montpetit), Montreal Carabins
- Ariane Barker, (Lynx du Collège Édouard-Montpetit) – Montreal Carabins
- Maude Gélinas, (Lynx du Collège Édouard-Montpetit) – Montreal Carabins

== See also ==
- Hockey Québec
- Quebec Student Sports Federation
- Coupe Dodge
- Dawson College Blues women's ice hockey
- Lynx du Collège Édouard-Montpetit women's ice hockey
- Titans du Cégep Limoilou women's ice hockey
