= Cégep Édouard-Montpetit Lynx women's ice hockey =

Lynx du cégep Édouard-Montpetit women's ice hockey
- City: Longueuil, Québec, Canada
- League: Hockey collégial féminin RSEQ
- Founded: 2004
- Home arena: Aréna Émile-Butch-Bouchard
- Colours: Black, red
- Website: lynx.cegepmontpetit.ca

The Lynx du cégep Édouard-Montpetit women's ice hockey team, previously Lynx du Collège Édouard-Montpetit, represents Cégep Édouard-Montpetit in the Hockey collégial féminin RSEQ of the Réseau du sport étudiant du Québec (RSEQ). The team is based in Longueuil, in the southern Greater Montreal metropolitan area in Quebec and their home venue is the Aréna Émile-Butch-Bouchard.

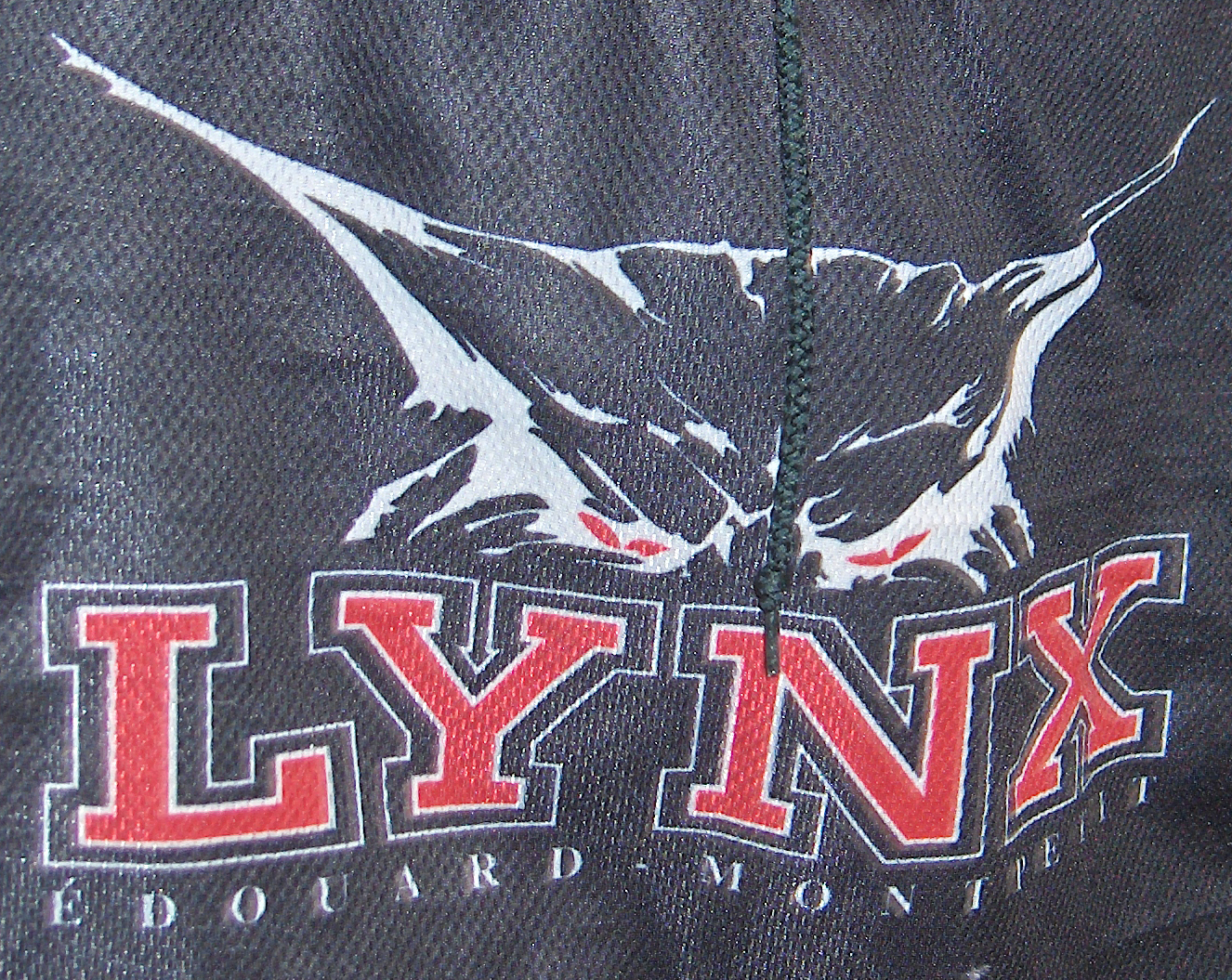
Lynx logo

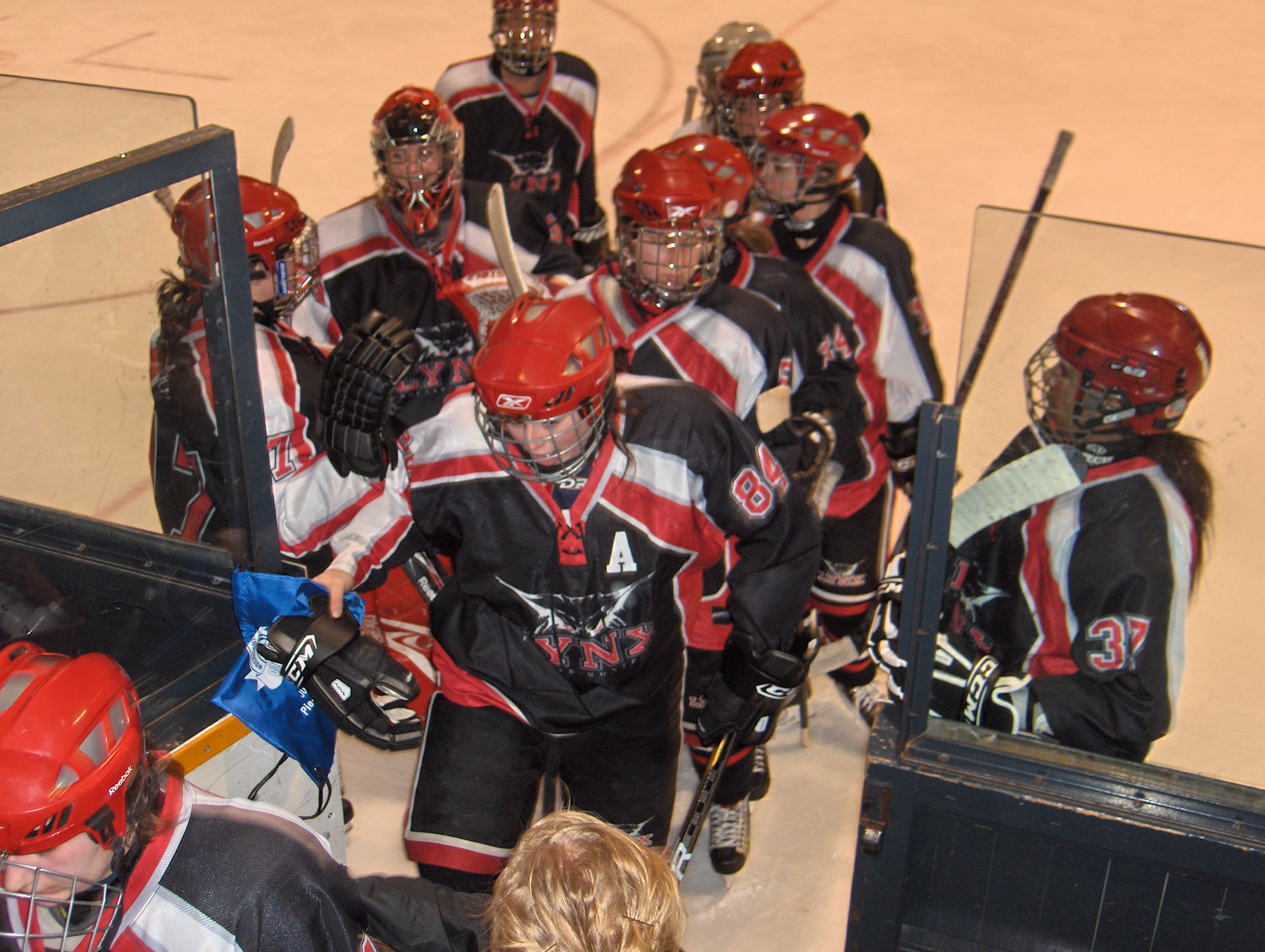
The Lynx gathering around the bench discussing strategy

== Team history ==
In April 2004, the Ligue de hockey féminin collégial AA announced that two new women's hockey teams would debut for the 2005–06 season. The Lynx were founded in the autumn of 2004. In 2009, the Lynx gained their first prominent attention when they eliminated the Dawson Blues in a 2009 playoff as they claimed their first championship. A second consecutive championship confirmed their superiority in Quebec women's collegiate ice hockey.

== Season-by-season results ==
Note: GP = Games played, W = Wins, L = Losses, T = Ties, OTL = Overtime losses, GF = Goals for, GA = Goals against, Pts = Points.

-
Year	GP	W	L	T	OTL	GF	GA	Pts
2005–06	27	15	10	0	2	101	75	32
2006–07	27	12	14	0	1	70	103	25
2007–08	27	12	13	0	2	92	89	26
2008–09	24	19	5	0	0	105	61	38
2009–10	21	19	1	0	1	136	27	39
2010–11	21	19	1	0	1	139	42	39
2011–12								

== Season standings ==
= Indicates First Place finish

= Indicates Playoff championship

Year	Reg. season	Playoffs
2005-06	5th	Did not qualify
2006-07	7th	Did not qualify
2007-08	6th	Did not qualify
2008-09	2nd	Champions
2009-10	1st Overall	Champions
2010-11	1st Overall	lost the final game
2011-12		

== Playoffs results ==
Following the regular season, a playoff was held to determine the Collegial women's champion in Quebec.

=== Playoff 2011-12 ===
First round
Semi-finals and Championship Final game 2011-12

=== Playoff 2010-11 ===
First round

The Lynx finished in first place in Group A.

GP	W	L	OTL	GF	GA	Pts
6	5	0	1	36	14	15

Note: GP = Games played, W = Wins, L = Losses, OTL = Overtime losses, GF = Goals for, GA = Goals against, Pts = Points.

Semi-finals and Championship Final game 2010-11

Playoff	Date	Time	Teams	Attendance
Semi-final	April 2	3:30 pm	Lynx Édouard-Montpetit 4 - 0 Dawson Blues	450 supporters
Semi-Final	April 2	5:30pm	Patriotes St-Laurent 2 - 1 (wins in shootout) Titans Limoilou	400 supporters
Final Bronze Medal	April 3	12:30 noon	Titans Limoilou 2-0 Dawson Blues	280 supporters
Final Gold Medal	April 3	3:00 pm	Patriotes St-Laurent 5 - 2 Lynx Édouard-Montpetit	420 supporters

=== Playoff 2009-10 ===
First round

The Lynx finished in first place in their respective group.

GP	W	L	OTL	GF	GA	Pts
7	7	0	0	44	9	21

Note: GP = Games played, W = Wins, L = Losses, OTL = Overtime losses, GF = Goals for, GA = Goals against, Pts = Points.

Semi-finals and Championship Final game 2009-10

Playoff	Date	Teams
Semi-Final	April 3	Cheminots Saint-Jérôme 2 - 4 Lynx Édouard-Montpetit
Semi-final	April 3	Titans Limoilou 3 - 4 Dragons Laflèche
Final Bronze Medal	April 4	Cheminots Saint-Jérôme 2 - 1 Titans Limoilou
Final Gold Medal	April 4	Dragons Laflèche 5 - 6 Lynx Édouard-Montpetit

winner: Lynx du Collège Édouard-Montpetit

=== Playoffs 2008-09 ===
Semi-finals and Championship Final game

Playoff	Date	Teams
Semi-Final	April 11	Dawson Blues 6-2 Titans Limoilou
Semi-final	April 11	Lynx Édouard-Montpetit 7- 1 Dragons Laflèche
Final Gold Medal	April 12	Lynx Édouard-Montpetit 3 - 2 (wins in shootout) Dawson Blues

winner:Lynx du Collège Édouard-Montpetit

== Current roster 2011-12 ==
Goaltenders
Number	Country	Player	Year with Lynx	Hometown
1	(Canada)	Meng Maltais-Séguin	2nd	Gatineau, Quebec
29	(Canada)	Frédérique Desmarais	2nd	Saint-Hubert, Quebec
55	(Canada)	Amélie Roy	2nd	Varennes, Quebec

Defensemen
Number	Country	Player	Year with Lynx	Hometown
9	(Canada)	Emmanuella Leboeuf	1st	Sainte-Catherine, Quebec
14	(Canada)	Kristel Morin	1st	Gatineau, Quebec
16	(Canada)	Cynthia Whissell	2nd	Dorval, Quebec
21	(Canada)	Émilie Provencher	2nd	Boucherville, Qc.
24	(Canada)	Valérie St-Onge	1st	Brossard, Quebec
25	(Canada)	Roxanne Rioux	1st	Rimouski, Quebec
77	(Canada)	Claudianne Delorme	1st	Lasalle, Quebec

Forwards
Number	Country	Player	Year with Lynx	Hometown
3	(Canada)	Geneviève Legault	1st	Ste-Julie, Quebec
4	(Canada)	Gabrielle Savoie	2nd	Mirabel, Quebec
5	(Canada)	Kassie Beaudry	3rd	Rougemont, Quebec
10	(Canada)	Sylvie-Anne Bégin	2nd	Léry, Quebec
15	(Canada)	Rika Pilon-Robert	2nd	Île Bizard, Quebec
17	(Canada)	Dominique Gagnon-Goyette	1st	Quebec city, Quebec
22	(Canada)	Camille Pauck-Therrien	1st	Boucherville, Quebec
30	(Canada)	Élizabeth Audette-Bourdeau	1st	Chambly, Quebec
37	(Canada)	Mélodie Bouchard	1st	Sept-Îles, Quebec
74	(Canada)	Alexandra Champagne	1st	Saint-Eustache, Quebec
84	(Canada)	Émilie Tessier	1st	Marieville, Quebec

== Coaching staff ==
- General Manager: Patrick Larivière
- Head Coach: Patrick Larivière
- Assistant Coach: Éric Miculescu
- Assistant Coach: Marie-Laurence Cyr
- Assistant Coach: Caroline Ouellette
- Physioherapist: Marie-Josée Lefebvre & Marie-Claude Lapointe

== Team awards and honors ==
- 2009-10 Ligue de hockey féminin collégial AA Championship
- 2010 won the Challenge féminin Panthères AAA U-17 ans
- 2009 McGill Tournament invitation champions
- 2009 won the Tournoi universitaire de Moncton
- 2008-09 Ligue de hockey féminin collégial AA Championship
- 2008-09 Champion of Tournoi Cergy (in France)

== Individual awards and honors ==
2010-11 season

- Player of the Year Award: Mélodie Daoust
- 5 Lynx were named to the All-Star teams of the league: Mélodie Daoust (forward), Ariane Barker (forward), Maude Gélinas (forward), Valérie Watson (defensemen), Cynthia Whissell (defensemen).

Season 2009-10

- Rookie of the Year Award: Mélodie Daoust
- 5 Lynx were named to the All-Star team of the League: Mélodie Daoust (forward), Katia Heydra-Clément (forward), Sophie Brault (defensemen), Janique Duval (defensemen), Roxanne Douville (goaltender),

Season 2008-09

- Fair-play Award: Katia Clément-Heydra
- 3 lynx on the star team of the League: Katia Clément-Heydra (forward), Casandra Dupuis (forward), Roxanne Douville (goaltender),

Awards and individual honors are not available for the other seasons.

== Players in CIS or NCAA ==
Player	School
Roxanne Douville (2007-2010)	Vermont Catamounts women's ice hockey and Canada's national women's under-22 team.
Katia Clément-Heydra (2007-2010)	McGill Martlets women's ice hockey
Janique Duval (2007-2010)	Montreal Carabins women's ice hockey
Ariane Barker, (2009-2011)	Montreal Carabins women's ice hockey
Maude Gélinas, (2009-2011)	Montreal Carabins women's ice hockey
Mélodie Daoust, (2009-2011)	McGill Martlets women's ice hockey and Canada's National women's team Under-18 team.

=== International ===
Player	Position	Event	Result
Roxanne Douville	Goaltender	2009 IIHF World Women's U18 Championship	Silver
Melodie Daoust	Forward	2009 IIHF World Women's U18 Championship	Silver
Melodie Daoust	Forward	2010 IIHF World Women's U18 Championship	Gold

== See also ==
- Hockey collégial féminin RSEQ
- Coupe Dodge
