= Limoilou (disambiguation) =

Limoilou may refer to:

- La Cité-Limoilou, a borough of Quebec City
- Limoilou (electoral district), a former provincial electoral district in Quebec
- Beauport—Limoilou, a Canadian federal electoral district located in Quebec
- Cégep Limoilou, a CEGEP (junior college) in Quebec
