= Fillion =

Fillion is a surname. Notable people with the surname include:

- Bob Fillion (1920–2015), Canadian ice hockey player
- Denis Fillion (1948–2016), Canadian curler
- Emmanuel Fillion (born 1966), French-American sculptor
- Gilbert Fillion (1940–2007), Canadian politician
- Jeff Fillion (born 1967), Canadian radio host and businessman
- Joseph-Ludger Fillion (1895–1971), Canadian politician
- Marcel Fillion (1922–1998), Canadian ice hockey player
- Nathan Fillion (born 1971), Canadian actor
- Patrick Fillion (born 1973), Canadian illustrator and writer
- Yann Fillion (born 1996), Canadian soccer player

== See also ==
- Fillon (disambiguation)
