= Mélodie Daoust =

Canadian ice hockey player (born 1992)

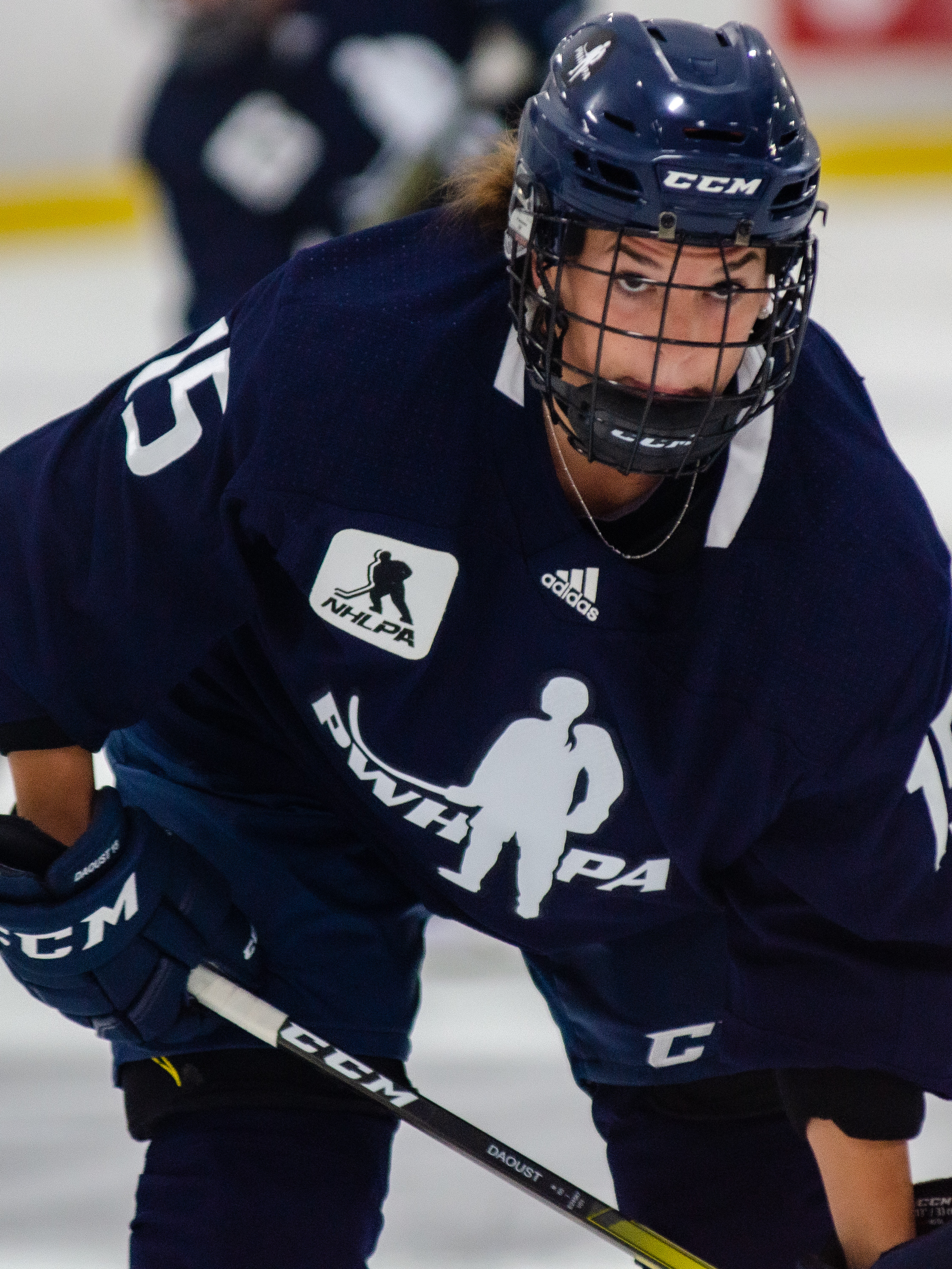
- Daoust in 2019
- Born: January 7, 1992 (age 34) Valleyfield, Quebec, Canada
- Height: 5 ft 6 in (168 cm)
- Weight: 157 lb (71 kg; 11 st 3 lb)
- Position: Forward
- Shot: Left
- Played for: PWHL Montreal; PWHPA; Les Canadiennes de Montréal; McGill Martlets
- National team: Canada
- Playing career: 2011–2024
- Website: http://melodiedaoust.com/
Medal record
Women's ice hockey
Representing Canada
Olympic Games
Gold medal – first place	2014 Sochi	Team
Gold medal – first place	2022 Beijing	Team
Silver medal – second place	2018 Pyeongchang	Team
World Championships
Gold medal – first place	2021 Canada
Bronze medal – third place	2019 Finland
World U18 Championships
Gold medal – first place	2010 United States

Mélodie Daoust (/dæˈu/ Da-OO; born January 7, 1992) is a Canadian former ice hockey player. She played one season in the Professional Women's Hockey League (PWHL) for Montreal. She competed with the Canadian national team in numerous international tournaments and won a gold medal at the 2014 Winter Olympics, a silver medal at the 2018 Winter Olympics and a gold medal at the 2022 Winter Olympics. As a member-player of the PWHPA, she was featured in many of the organization's showcases, including the Elite Women's 3-on-3 hockey game at the Skills Competition of the 2020 NHL All-Star Game.

== Playing career ==
In 2008–09, she played with the Lac St. Louis Selects and helped them accumulate a 62–0–2 record. Daoust was a Montreal Canadiens scholarship holder in 2010 from the Quebec Foundation for Athletic Excellence. With the Collège Édouard-Montpetit Lynx, she helped lead them to a Quebec collegiate championship in 2009–10. In addition, she won the league scoring title with 24 goals and 31 assists for 55 total points. She accomplished this in only 13 games played.

In participating with the Canada women's national under-18 ice hockey team, Daoust registered 10 goals and 23 points in 13 games. At the 2010 IIHF world U-18 championships, she scored a goal and adding an assist in the gold medal game. The following day, she flew back to Montreal to help the Lynx capture the collegiate championship. She scored twice and added an assist in the championship game, including the game-winner in a 6–5 win versus Dragons du Collège Laflèche. She had helped the Lynx accumulate a won-loss record of 44 wins, compared to 3 losses.

=== CWHL ===
She was called up as an emergency fill-in with the Montreal Stars, and scored three points in her CWHL debut on January 8 (versus the Burlington Barracudas).

=== CIS ===
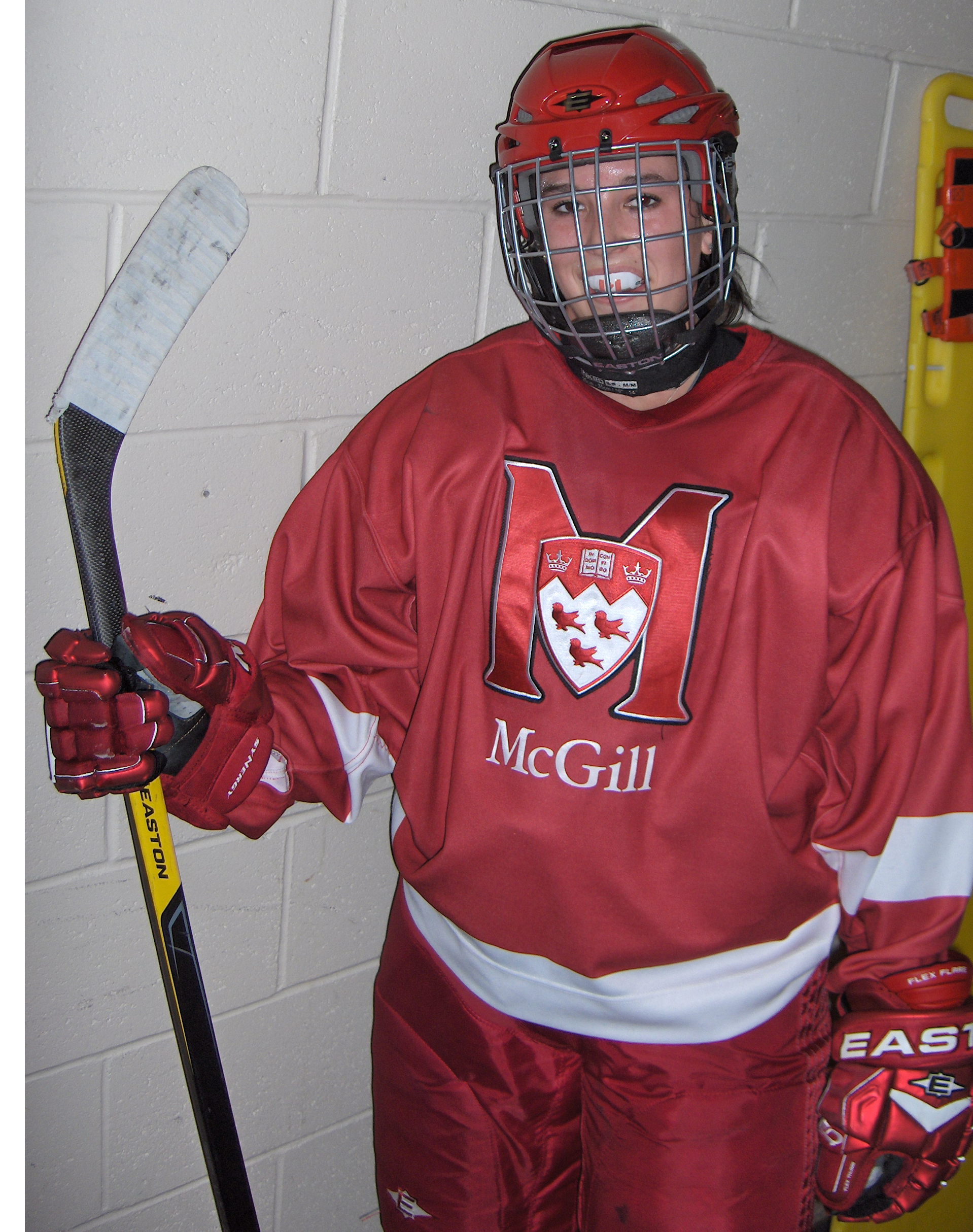
Daoust with McGill in 2011

On February 10, 2011, Daoust signed a letter of intent to play for the McGill Martlets women's ice hockey program. She refused offers from numerous Canadian and American universities, including Cornell, Dartmouth and a full scholarship from Boston University. Daoust was only one of five female student-athletes committed to McGill University in the fall of 2011 that were athletic scholarship recipients (announced by the Quebec Foundation for Athletic Excellence).

In the aftermath of the 2012–13 season, Daoust was named to the CIS First Team All-Canadians. Among the other players named as First Team All-Canadians were Katelyn Gosling and Hayley Wickenheiser.

=== Hockey Canada ===
Daoust was part of Canada women's national under-18 ice hockey team that won a gold medal at the 2010 IIHF World Women's Under-18 Championship in Chicago. As a member of the gold medal-winning squad, a hockey card of her was featured in the Upper Deck 2010 World of Sports card series. In addition, she participated in the Canada Celebrates Event on June 30 in Edmonton, Alberta which recognized the Canadian Olympic and World hockey champions from the 2009–10 season. On October 3, 2011, she was named to the Team Canada roster that participated in the 2011 4 Nations Cup. She scored her first international goal on February 17 at the 2014 Sochi Olympics against Switzerland and they won the gold medal.

On January 11, 2022, Daoust was named to Canada's 2022 Olympic team.

== Career statistics ==
=== Regular season and playoffs ===
			Regular season					Playoffs
Season	Team	League	GP	G	A	Pts	PIM	GP	G	A	Pts	PIM
2009–10	Cégep Édouard-Montpetit	QCHL	13	21	34	55	—	—	—	—	—	—
2010–11	Cégep Édouard-Montpetit	QCHL	17	21	23	44	—	—	—	—	—	—
2010–11	Montréal Stars	CWHL	2	0	3	3	0	—	—	—	—	—
2011–12	McGill University	CIS	18	18	24	42	6	—	—	—	—	—
2012–13	McGill University	CIS	20	21	33	54	12	—	—	—	—	—
2013–14	McGill University	CIS	—	—	—	—	—	—	—	—	—	—
2014–15	McGill University	CIS	3	3	4	7	6	—	—	—	—	—
2015–16	McGill University	CIS	20	18	16	34	22	—	—	—	—	—
2016–17	McGill University	CIS	18	11	19	30	12	—	—	—	—	—
2017–18	Les Canadiennes de Montréal	CWHL	—	—	—	—	—	—	—	—	—	—
2018–19	Les Canadiennes de Montréal	CWHL	14	11	9	20	24	4	2	3	5	2
2019–20	Montréal	PWHPA	—	—	—	—	—	—	—	—	—	—
2020–21	Montréal	PWHPA	—	—	—	—	—	—	—	—	—	—
2022–23	Team Scotiabank	PWHPA	11	2	6	8	2	—	—	—	—	—
2023–24	PWHL Montreal	PWHL	6	3	2	5	4	3	0	0	0	2
CWHL totals			16	11	12	23	24	4	2	3	5	2
PWHPA totals			11	2	6	8	2	—	—	—	—	—
PWHL totals			6	3	2	5	4	3	0	0	0	2

=== International ===
Year	Team	Event	Result	GP	G	A	Pts	PIM
2009	Canada	U18	2nd place, silver medalist(s)	5	6	6	12	4
2010	Canada	U18	1st place, gold medalist(s)	5	4	4	8	4
2014	Canada	OG	1st place, gold medalist(s)	5	1	0	1	4
2018	Canada	OG	2nd place, silver medalist(s)	5	3	4	7	2
2019	Canada	WC	3rd place, bronze medalist(s)	7	0	4	4	4
2021	Canada	WC	1st place, gold medalist(s)	8	6	6	12	2
2022	Canada	OG	1st place, gold medalist(s)	3	0	1	1	0
Junior totals				10	10	10	20	8
Senior totals				28	10	15	25	12

== Awards and honours ==
- Most Valuable Player at the 2018 Olympics - Ice hockey at the 2018 Winter Olympics – Women's tournament
- 2009–10 Ligue de hockey féminin collégial AA scoring champion
- Canadian Interuniversity Sport (CIS) Rookie of the Year (Tissot Award) (2011–12) et second star team
- Most valuable player at the McGill University women's hockey awards gala
- CIS women's hockey Player of the Year (Brodrick Trophy), (2012–2013)
- 2013 RSEQ scoring champion
- 2012-13 USports First Team All-Star
- Among four finalists for the CIS BLG Awards 2013 Athlete of the Year (Jim Thompson Trophy)
- 2015-16 U Sports First Team All-Canadian
- 2016-17 RSEQ MOST OUTSTANDING PLAYER
- 2016-17 RSEQ First Team All-Stars

== Personal life ==
In 2013, Daoust came out as lesbian. She was married her longtime partner, Audrey St-Germain in 2019, and they separated the next year. The couple have one son, Mathéo born in May 2018. She is now in a relationship with former professional hockey player Hanna Bunton, and has been since 2021. Daoust and Bunton announced in early 2025 they were expecting a son together, due later that year. Their son Bowie Bunton Daoust was born July 31st of that year.
