= Richard Filion =

Canadian academic administrator

Richard Filion has been since 2005 Director General of Dawson College, the largest collegial institutions in the province of Quebec. From 2000 to 2004, he was Academic Dean of Cégep Limoilou. Prior to this, he was a teacher in Gaspésie.
