= Emmanuel Fillion =

French/American sculptor

Emmanuel Fillion (born October 28, 1966) is a French-American sculptor. His marble and bronze works can be seen in public places, private homes and private collections including the Spencer and Marlene Hays collection. He has a studio in the Pietrasanta, Italy, and one in Malibu. He was the subject of a documentary by Gina Minervini called "Through the Eyes of the Sculptor."

== Early life and family ==
Fillion was born in Soissons, France in 1966. He started sculpting at the age of 15 as an apprentice renovating historical monuments in France.

Fillion is a descendant of Jean Cousin (1500 – before 1593), who was a French painter, sculptor, etcher, engraver, and geometrician known for his painting in the Louvre of Eva Prima Pandora, 1550.

== Career ==
Emmanuel Fillion's work is inspired by dance and movement.
