= 2019–20 NCAA Division I women's ice hockey rankings =

- NCAA tournament: 2020
- Preseason No. 1 (USA Today): Wisconsin
- Preseason No. 1 (USCHO): Wisconsin
- NCAA Division I women's ice hockey rankings

Two polls make up the 2019–20 NCAA Division I women's ice hockey rankings, the USCHO.com poll and the USA Today/USA Hockey Magazine poll. As the 2019–20 season progresses, rankings are updated weekly.

== Legend ==
| | Increase in ranking |
| | Decrease in ranking |
| | Not ranked previous week |
| Italics | Number of first place votes |
| (#-#) | Win–loss–tie record |
| т | Tied with team above or below also with this symbol |

== USCHO ==
| | Preseason Sep 16 | Week 1 Sep 30 | Week 2 Oct 7 | Week 3 Oct 14 | Week 4 Oct 21 | Week 5 Oct 28 | Week 6 Nov 4 | Week 7 Nov 11 | Week 8 Nov 18 | Week 9 Nov 25 | Week 10 Dec 2 | Week 11 Dec 9 | Week 12 Jan 6 | Week 13 Jan 13 | Week 14 Jan 20 | Week 15 Jan 27 | Week 16 Feb 3 | Week 17 Feb 10 | Week 18 Feb 17 | Week 19 Feb 24 | Week 20 Mar 2 | Week 21 Mar 9 | Final Mar 23 | |
|---|---|---|---|---|---|---|---|---|---|---|---|---|---|---|---|---|---|---|---|---|---|---|---|---|
| 1. | Wisconsin (15) | Wisconsin (2–0–0) (15) | Wisconsin (4–0–0) (15) | Wisconsin (6–0–0) (14) | Wisconsin (8–0–0) (13) | Wisconsin (10–0–0) (15) | Minnesota (10–1–1) (14) | Minnesota (10–1–1) (15) | Minnesota (12–1–1) (15) | Minnesota (13–1–2) (14) | Wisconsin (16–1–1) (8) | Wisconsin (18–1–1) (11) | Wisconsin (20–1–1) (13) | Minnesota (19–1–3) (10) | Wisconsin (21–2–1) (8) | Wisconsin (23–2–1) (13) | Wisconsin (25–2–1) (14) | Cornell (21–1–3) (11) | Cornell (23–1–3) (15) | Cornell (25–1–3) (14) | Cornell (27–1–3) (15) | Cornell (28–2–3) (14) | Cornell (28–2–3) (12) | 1. |
| 2. | Minnesota | Minnesota (2–0–0) | Minnesota (4–0–0) | Minnesota (6–0–0) (1) | Minnesota (8–0–0) (2) | Minnesota (9–1–0) | Wisconsin (10–1–1) (1) | Wisconsin (10–1–1) | Wisconsin (12–1–1) | Wisconsin (14–1–1) (1) | Minnesota (14–1–3) (7) | Minnesota (15–1–3) (4) | Minnesota (17–1–3) (2) | Wisconsin (21–2–1) (5) | Minnesota (20–2–3) (8) | Minnesota (20–4–3) (1) | Cornell (19–1–3) (1) | Wisconsin (26–3–1) (4) | Wisconsin (26–4–2) | Wisconsin (27–4–3) (1) | Wisconsin (27–4–3) | Wisconsin (28–5–3) | Wisconsin (28–5–3) (1) | 2. |
| 3. | Clarkson | Clarkson (2–0–0) | Northeastern (1–0–0) | Northeastern (3–0–0) | Northeastern (5–0–0) | Cornell (2–0–0) | Cornell (4–0–0) | Cornell (5–0–1) | Cornell (7–0–1) | Cornell (7–0–1) | Northeastern (13–2–0) | Northeastern (14–2–0) | Northeastern (15–3–1) | Northeastern (17–3–1) | Northeastern (19–3–1) | Northeastern (21–3–1) | Northeastern (23–3–1) | Northeastern (25–3–1) | Minnesota (23–5–3) т | Minnesota (25–5–3) | Minnesota (27–5–3) | Northeastern (32–4–2) | Northeastern (32–4–2) (1) | 3. |
| 4. | Northeastern | Northeastern (0–0–0) | Clarkson (3–1–0) | Clarkson (3–1–0) | Clarkson (4–1–1) | Northeastern (5–1–0) | Northeastern (7–1–0) | Northeastern (8–1–0) | Northeastern (10–1–0) | Northeastern (12–2–0) | Cornell (9–1–1) | Cornell (11–1–1) | Cornell (13–1–1) | Cornell (14–1–2) | Cornell (16–1–2) (1) | Cornell (18–1–2) (1) | Minnesota (21–5–3) (1) | Minnesota (23–5–3) (1) | Northeastern (26–4–2) т | Northeastern (28–4–2) | Northeastern (30–4–2) | Ohio State (24–8–6) (1) | Ohio State (24–8–6) (1) | 4. |
| 5. | Cornell | Cornell (0–0–0) | Cornell (0–0–0) | Cornell (0–0–0) | Cornell (0–0–0) | Clarkson (5–1–2) | Boston College (9–0–1) | Clarkson (8–1–3) | Clarkson (10–1–3) | Princeton (9–2–0) | Ohio State (10–4–4) | Ohio State (10–4–4) | Ohio State (11–5–4) | Ohio State (13–5–4) | Ohio State (14–6–4) | Ohio State (16–6–4) | Ohio State (17–6–5) | Princeton (19–4–1) | Ohio State (18–8–6) | Ohio State (20–8–6) | Ohio State (22–8–6) | Minnesota (27–6–3) | Minnesota (27–6–3) | 5. |
| 6. | Princeton | Princeton (0–0–0) | Princeton (0–0–0) | Princeton (0–0–0) | Boston College (6–0–0) | Princeton (2–0–0) | Clarkson (7–1–2) | Boston College (9–1–1) | Boston College (10–1–1) | Ohio State (9–3–4) | Princeton (9–2–0) | Clarkson (14–2–4) | Clarkson (14–2–4) | Princeton (14–4–1) | Princeton (14–4–1) | Princeton (14–4–1) | Princeton (17–4–1) | Ohio State (17–8–5) т | Princeton (20–5–1) | Princeton (22–5–1) | Princeton (24–6–1) | Princeton (26–6–1) | Princeton (26–6–1) | 6. |
| 7. | Boston University | Boston College (2–0–0) | Boston College (4–0–0) | Boston College (4–0–0) | Princeton (0–0–0) | Boston College (7–0–1) | Princeton (4–1–0) | Ohio State (7–3–2) | Ohio State (8–3–3) | Clarkson (10–2–4) | Clarkson (12–2–4) | Princeton (10–3–0) | Princeton (13–4–0) | Clarkson (15–3–4) | Clarkson (16–4–4) т | Clarkson (18–4–4) | Clarkson (18–4–6) | Clarkson (20–4–6) т | Clarkson (21–5–6) | Clarkson (23–5–6) | Clarkson (25–5–6) | Clarkson (25–6–6) | Clarkson (25–6–6) | 7. |
| 8. | Boston College | Boston University (0–0–0) | Ohio State (4–0–0) | Minnesota Duluth (3–1–0) | Robert Morris (2–3–0) | Ohio State (5–3–2) | Ohio State (7–3–2) | Princeton (5–2–0) | Princeton (7–2–0) | Boston College (11–3–1) | Boston College (11–4–2) | Boston University (12–4–1) | Boston University (13–4–2) | Boston University (14–5–2) | Boston University (16–5–2) т | Boston University (17–5–3) | Boston University (18–6–3) | Minnesota Duluth (15–9–4) | Boston University (22–6–4) | Boston University (24–6–4) | Minnesota Duluth (18–11–6) | Minnesota Duluth (18–12–6) | Minnesota Duluth (18–12–6) | 8. |
| 9. | Ohio State | Ohio State (2–0–0) | Minnesota Duluth (1–1–0) | Ohio State (4–2–0) | Ohio State (4–2–2) | Boston University (5–1–1) | Minnesota Duluth (7–3–0) | Harvard (5–0–0) | Harvard (5–0–0) | Minnesota Duluth (7–5–2) | Boston University (10–4–1) | Boston College (11–6–2) | Harvard (10–4–0) | Harvard (10–5–1) | Minnesota Duluth (11–8–3) | Minnesota Duluth (12–8–4) | Minnesota Duluth (13–9–4) | Boston University (20–6–3) | Minnesota Duluth (16–9–5) | Minnesota Duluth (16–10–6) | Boston University (24–8–4) | Boston University (24–8–4) | Boston University (24–8–4) | 9. |
| 10. | Minnesota Duluth | Minnesota Duluth (0–0–0) | Boston University (1–0–0) | Robert Morris (2–2–0) | Boston University (3–1–1) | Minnesota Duluth (5–3–0) | Boston University (5–3–1) | Minnesota Duluth (7–3–0) | Minnesota Duluth (7–4–1) | Boston University (10–4–1) | Minnesota Duluth (8–6–2) | Minnesota Duluth (8–8–2) | Minnesota Duluth (9–8–3) | Minnesota Duluth (9–8–3) | Harvard (10–7–1) | Harvard (11–8–1) | Harvard (12–8–1) | Harvard (13–10–1) т Quinnipiac (17–10–3) т | Quinnipiac (18–11–3) | Quinnipiac (19–12–3) | Harvard (18–13–1) т Quinnipiac (20–14–3) т | Mercyhurst (21–10–5) | Mercyhurst (21–10–5) | 10. |
| | Preseason Sep 16 | Week 1 Sep 30 | Week 2 Oct 7 | Week 3 Oct 14 | Week 4 Oct 21 | Week 5 Oct 28 | Week 6 Nov 4 | Week 7 Nov 11 | Week 8 Nov 18 | Week 9 Nov 25 | Week 10 Dec 2 | Week 11 Dec 9 | Week 12 Jan 6 | Week 13 Jan 13 | Week 14 Jan 20 | Week 15 Jan 27 | Week 16 Feb 3 | Week 17 Feb 10 | Week 18 Feb 17 | Week 19 Feb 24 | Week 20 Mar 2 | Week 21 Mar 9 | Final Mar 23 | |
| | | None | None | Dropped: Boston University | Dropped: Minnesota Duluth | Dropped: Robert Morris | None | Dropped: Boston University | None | Dropped: Harvard | None | None | Dropped: Boston College | None | None | None | None | None | Dropped: Harvard | None | None | Dropped: Harvard; Quinnipiac | None | |

== USA Today ==
| | Preseason Sep 24 | Week 1 Oct 1 | Week 2 Oct 8 | Week 3 Oct 15 | Week 4 Oct 22 | Week 5 Oct 29 | Week 6 Nov 5 | Week 7 Nov 12 | Week 8 Nov 19 | Week 9 Nov 26 | Week 10 Dec 3 | Week 11 Dec 10 | Week 12 Dec 17 | Week 13 Jan 7 | Week 14 Jan 14 | Week 15 Jan 21 | Week 16 Jan 28 | Week 17 Feb 4 | Week 18 Feb 11 | Week 19 Feb 18 | Week 20 Feb 25 | Week 21 Mar 3 | Week 22 Mar 10 | Final | |
|---|---|---|---|---|---|---|---|---|---|---|---|---|---|---|---|---|---|---|---|---|---|---|---|---|---|
| 1. | Wisconsin (19) | Wisconsin (2–0–0) (19) | Wisconsin (4–0–0) (19) | Wisconsin (6–0–0) (19) | Wisconsin (8–0–0) (19) | Wisconsin (10–0–0) (19) | Minnesota (10–1–1) (19) | Minnesota (10–1–1) (18) | Minnesota (12–1–1) (19) | Minnesota (13–1–2) (19) | Wisconsin (16–1–1) (12) | Wisconsin (18–1–1) (15) | Wisconsin (18–1–1) (19) | Wisconsin (20–1–1) (19) | Minnesota (19–1–3) (13) | Wisconsin (21–2–1) (13) | Wisconsin (23–2–1) (17) | Wisconsin (25–2–1) (18) | Cornell (21–1–3) (12) | Cornell (21–1–3) (17) | Cornell (25–1–3) (17) | Cornell (27–1–3) (18) | Cornell (28–2–3) (18) | | 1. |
| 2. | Minnesota | Minnesota (2–0–0) | Minnesota (4–0–0) | Minnesota (6–0–0) | Minnesota (8–0–0) | Minnesota (9–1–0) | Wisconsin (10–1–1) | Wisconsin (10–1–1) (1) | Wisconsin (12–1–1) | Wisconsin (14–1–1) | Minnesota (14–1–3) (7) | Minnesota (15–1–3) (4) | Minnesota (15–1–3) | Minnesota (17–1–3) | Wisconsin (21–2–1) (6) | Minnesota (20–2–3) (5) | Minnesota (20–4–3) | Northeastern (23–3–1) | Wisconsin (26–3–1) (4) | Wisconsin (26–4–2) (1) | Wisconsin (27–4–3) (2) | Wisconsin (27–4–3) (1) | Wisconsin (28–5–3) | | 2. |
| 3. | Clarkson | Clarkson (2–0–0) | Northeastern (1–0–0) | Northeastern (3–0–0) | Northeastern (5–0–0) | Cornell (2–0–0) | Cornell (4–0–0) | Cornell (5–0–1) | Cornell (7–0–1) | Cornell (7–0–1) | Northeastern (13–2–0) | Cornell (11–1–1) | Northeastern (14–2–0) | Northeastern (15–3–1) | Northeastern (17–3–1) | Northeastern (19–3–1) | Northeastern (21–3–1) | Minnesota (21–5–3) (1) | Northeastern (25–3–1) | Minnesota (23–5–3) (1) | Minnesota (25–5–3) | Minnesota (27–5–3) | Northeastern (32–4–2) | | 3. |
| 4. | Northeastern | Northeastern (0–0–0) | Clarkson (3–1–0) | Clarkson (3–1–0) | Clarkson (4–1–1) | Northeastern (4–1–0) | Northeastern (7–1–0) | Northeastern (8–1–0) | Northeastern (10–1–0) | Northeastern (12–2–0) | Cornell (9–1–1) | Northeastern (14–2–0) | Cornell (11–1–1) | Cornell (13–1–1) | Cornell (14–1–2) | Cornell (16–1–2) (1) | Cornell (18–1–2) (1) | Cornell (19–1–3) | Minnesota (25–5–3) | Northeastern (26–4–2) | Northeastern (28–4–2) | Northeastern (30–4–2) | Ohio State (24–8–6) (1) | | 4. |
| 5. | Cornell | Cornell (0–0–0) | Cornell (0–0–0) | Cornell (0–0–0) | Cornell (0–0–0) | Princeton (2–0–0) | Clarkson (7–1–2) | Clarkson (8–1–3) | Clarkson (10–1–3) | Princeton (9–2–0) | Ohio State (10–4–4) | Ohio State (10–4–4) | Clarkson (14–2–4) | Ohio State (11–5–4) | Ohio State (13–5–4) | Ohio State (14–6–4) | Ohio State (16–6–4) | Ohio State (17–6–5) | Princeton (19–4–1) | Ohio State (16–8–6) | Ohio State (20–8–6) | Ohio State (22–8–6) | Minnesota (27–6–3) | | 5. |
| 6. | Princeton | Princeton (0–0–0) | Princeton (0–0–0) | Princeton (0–0–0) | Princeton (0–0–0) | Clarkson (5–1–2) | Boston College (9–0–1) | Boston College (9–1–1) | Boston College (10–1–1) | Clarkson (10–2–4) | Princeton (9–2–0) | Clarkson (14–2–4) | Ohio State (11–5–4) | Clarkson (14–2–4) | Princeton (14–4–1) | Princeton (14–4–1) | Princeton (14–4–1) | Princeton (17–4–1) | Clarkson (20–4–6) | Princeton (20–5–1) | Princeton (22–5–1) | Princeton (24–6–1) | Princeton (26–6–1) | | 6. |
| 7. | Boston University | Boston College (2–0–0) | Boston College (4–0–0) | Boston College (4–0–0) | Boston College (6–0–0) | Boston College (7–0–1) | Princeton (4–1–0) | Ohio State (7–3–2) | Ohio State (8–3–3) | Ohio State (9–3–4) | Clarkson (12–2–4) | Princeton (10–3–0) | Princeton (11–4–0) | Princeton (13–4–0) | Clarkson (14–3–4) | Clarkson (16–4–4) | Clarkson (18–4–4) | Clarkson (18–4–6) | Ohio State (17–8–5) | Clarkson (21–5–6) | Clarkson (23–5–6) | Clarkson (25–5–6) | Clarkson (25–6–6) | | 7. |
| 8. | Boston College | Ohio State (2–0–0) | Ohio State (4–0–0) | Minnesota Duluth (3–1–0) | Ohio State (4–2–2) | Ohio State (5–3–2) | Ohio State (7–3–2) | Princeton (5–2–0) | Princeton (7–2–0) | Boston College (11–3–1) | Boston College (11–4–2) | Boston University (12–4–1) | Boston University (12–4–1) | Boston University (13–4–2) | Boston University (14–5–2) | Boston University (16–5–2) | Boston University (17–5–3) | Boston University (18–6–3) | Minnesota Duluth (15–9–4) | Minnesota Duluth (16–9–5) | Boston University (24–6–4) | Minnesota Duluth (18–11–6) | Minnesota Duluth (18–12–6) | | 8. |
| 9. | Ohio State | Boston University (0–0–0) | Minnesota Duluth (1–1–0) | Ohio State (4–2–0) | Robert Morris (2–3–1) | Boston University (5–2–1) | Minnesota Duluth (7–3–0) | Minnesota Duluth (7–3–0) | Harvard (5–0–0) | Minnesota Duluth (7–5–2) | Boston University (10–4–1) | Boston College (11–6–2) | Boston College (11–6–2) | Harvard (10–4–0) | Harvard (10–5–1) | Minnesota Duluth (11–8–3) | Minnesota Duluth (12–8–4) | Minnesota Duluth (13–9–4) | Boston University (20–6–3) | Boston University (22–6–4) | Minnesota Duluth (16–10–6) | Boston University (24–8–4) | Boston University (24–8–4) | | 9. |
| 10. | Colgate | Minnesota Duluth (0–0–0) | Boston University (1–0–0) | Robert Morris (2–2–0) | Boston University (3–1–1) | Minnesota Duluth (5–3–0) | Boston University (5–3–1) | Harvard (5–0–0) | Minnesota Duluth (7–4–1) | Boston University (10–4–1) | Minnesota Duluth (8–6–2) | Minnesota Duluth (8–8–2) | Minnesota Duluth (8–8–2) | Minnesota Duluth (9–8–3) | Minnesota Duluth (9–8–3) | Quinnipiac (13–7–3) | Harvard (11–8–1) | Harvard (12–8–1) | Harvard (13–10–1) | Quinnipiac (18–11–3) | Quinnipiac (19–12–3) | Harvard (18–13–1) | Quinnipiac (20–14–3) | | 10. |
| | Preseason Sep 24 | Week 1 Oct 1 | Week 2 Oct 8 | Week 3 Oct 15 | Week 4 Oct 22 | Week 5 Oct 29 | Week 6 Nov 5 | Week 7 Nov 12 | Week 8 Nov 19 | Week 9 Nov 26 | Week 10 Dec 3 | Week 11 Dec 10 | Week 12 Dec 17 | Week 13 Jan 7 | Week 14 Jan 14 | Week 15 Jan 21 | Week 16 Jan 28 | Week 17 Feb 4 | Week 18 Feb 11 | Week 19 Feb 18 | Week 20 Feb 25 | Week 21 Mar 3 | Week 22 Mar 10 | Final | |
| | | Dropped: Colgate | None | Dropped: Boston University | Dropped: Minnesota Duluth | Dropped: Robert Morris | None | Dropped: Boston University | None | Dropped: Harvard | None | None | None | Dropped: Boston College | None | Dropped: Harvard | Dropped: Quinnipiac | None | None | Dropped: Harvard | None | Dropped: Quinnipiac | Dropped: Harvard | None | |
