= Louise Filion =

Canadian professor of biogeography

- Born: 6 December 1945 (age 80); Montreal, Quebec, Canada

Academic background
- Education: Laval University

Academic work
- Institutions: Laval University
- Main interests: biogeography

Louise Filion (born 6 December 1945) is a Canadian professor of biogeography.

== Life ==
Filion was born in Montreal, Quebec on 6 December 1945, the daughter of Marguerite Bernier and Maurice Filion. She holds a bachelor's degree in geography, a master's degree in agriculture, and a Ph.D. in biology from Laval. She is the former director of the Geography department and Centre d'Études Nordiques at Laval University. Her appointment to Professor in the Geography department was a first for a woman at the university. Although she retired in September 2010 she remains an honorary member of the Centre for Northern Studies and has been designated professor emeritus.

== Research ==
Dr. Filion has northern research experience, particularly in ecology and paleoecology of northern Quebec. She has published hundreds of articles, chapters of books and written at least 60 research papers. She has presented her work at 140 national and international conferences in her specialty area of global polar science issues from 1987 to 1992 Dr. Filion directed the Centre for Northern Studies; she was President of the Research Commission from 1992 to 1995 and became Vice-Rector for Research at University Laval from 1997 to 2002. From 2004 to 2008 she was Director of Research in the Department of Geography and became Vice Dean of Research in the Faculty of Forestry, Geography and Geomatics from 2007 to 2009. In 1990 Dr. Filion became Vice President of the Canadian Polar Commission where she assumed the fonctions of member of evaluation committees and research committees.

== Selected works ==
- 1974, Classification des publications gouvernementales du Québec (with André Beaulieu)
- 1977, Rapport d'évaluation des propositions de réserve écologique : région sud-ouest du Québec (with Jean-Louis Blouin)
- 1977, L'archipel de Mingan: paysage à protéger, rapport de visite, 14-19 août 1977
- 1977, Rapport d'evaluation de la proposition de reserve ecologique de l'île Perrot (with Jean-Louis Blouin)
- 1977, Les réserves écologiques et la protection de la nature : les réalisations nord-américaines, européenes et japonaises
- 1998, Women's Entrepreneurship Development (WED) Project : Tanzania and Malawi : final evaluation (with Martha Bulengo; Thandiwe Mang'anda)
- 2000, Règles de catalogage anglo-américaines (with Michael Gorman; Paul W Winkler; Pierre Manseau; André Paul)
- 2007, Spatially explicit fire-climate history of the boreal forest-tundra (Eastern Canada) over the last 2000 years (with Serge Payette, Ann Delwaide)
- 2008, Biotic Disturbance in Expanding Subarctic Forests along the Eastern Coast of Hudson Bay
- 2010. Échantillonnage et datation dendrochronologiques.
- 2010. Dendroécologie des épidémies de la tenthrède du mélèze (Pristiphora erichsonii) dans l'est du Canada
- 2010, Tree-ring reconstructions in natural hazards research: a state-of-the-art. Springer book.
- 2010, La dendroécologie - Principes, méthodes et applications. Presses de l'Université Laval,
- 2011, False rings in the white pine (Pinus strobus) of the Outaouais Hills, Québec (Canada), as indicators of water stress (with Neil Marchand)
- 2011, Environmental Change in the Great Whale River Region, Hudson Bay: Five Decades of Multidisciplinary Research by Centre d'études Nordiques (CEN)
- 2013, Pre-European settlement paleoenvironments along the lower Saint-Charles River, Québec City (Canada) (with Querrec, Lydia; Auger, Réginald)
- 2014, Climate change and the forest sector: Perception of principal impacts and of potential options for adaptation (with Neil Marchand)
- 2014, Evidence for Changes in Paleoenvironments along the Lower Cap-Rouge River, Québec (Canada), in Relation to a High Water Stand during the Mid-Holocene Laurentian Transgression
- 2014, A dendroecological analysis of eastern hemlock and white pine in relation to logging in La Mauricie National Park (Québec, Canada). The Forestry Chronicle

== Bibliography ==
- Boisvert, Normand (1995). Les ancêtres et les descendants de Félix Boisvert, 1824-1915, de Émile Paquin, vers 1827-1859, et de Léocadie Rondeau, 1836-1894: History.
