= Cégep Édouard-Montpetit =

Public college in Longueuil, Quebec

Coordinates: 45°32′07″N 73°29′39″W

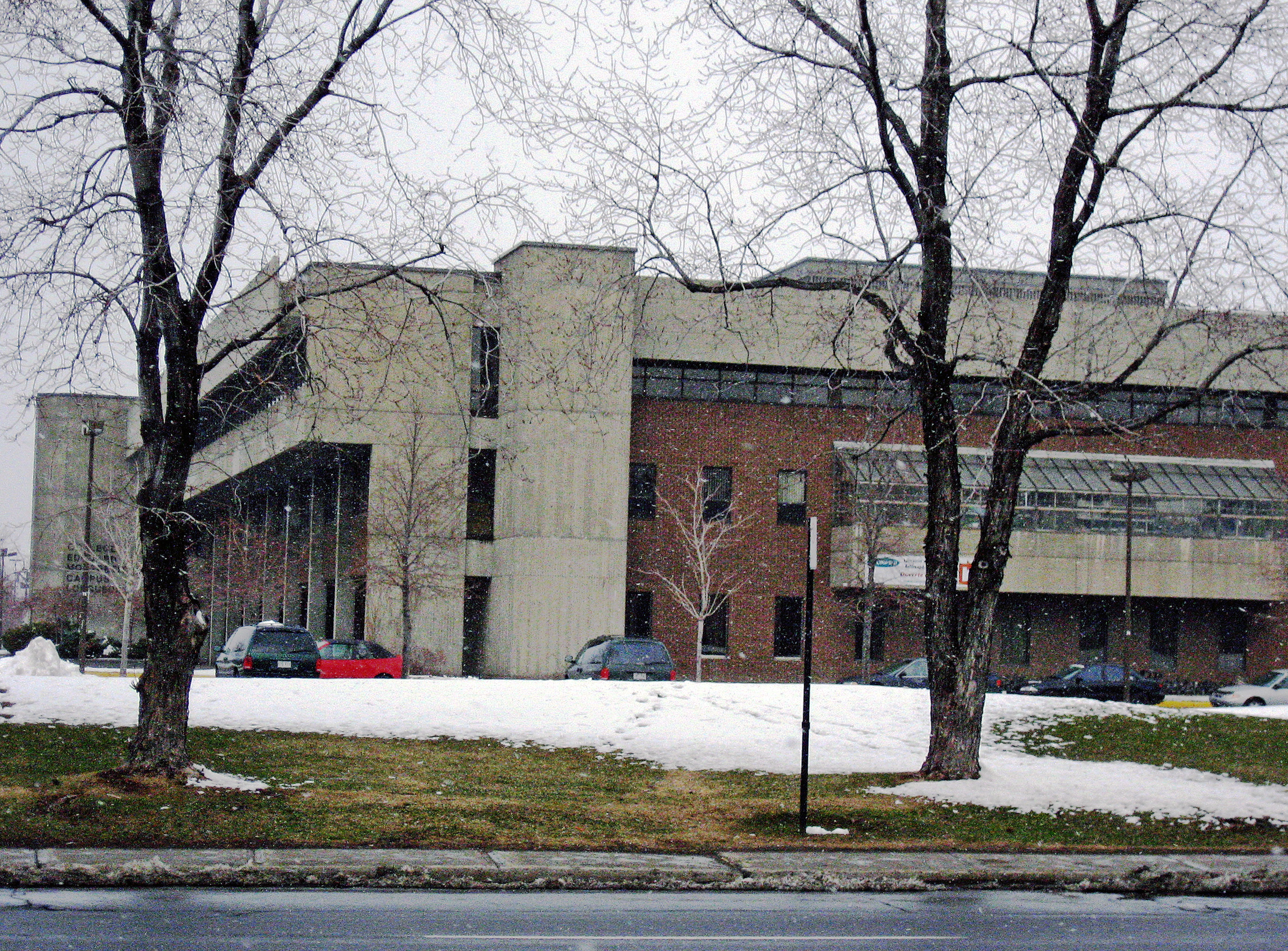
- Motto: Jamais trop grand pour te connaître
- Motto in English: Never too big to know yourself
- Type: Public college
- Established: 1967
- Academic affiliations: CICan, Fédération des Cégeps
- Students: 16 000 (est.)
- Location: Longueuil, Quebec, Canada
- Campus: Suburban
- Colours: Red & black
- Nickname: Lynx
- Sporting affiliations: CCAA, QSSF
- Website: www.cegepmontpetit.ca

Cégep Édouard-Montpetit (French pronunciation: [seʒɛp edwaʁ mɔ̃tpəti]) is a public Francophone college in Longueuil, Quebec, Canada. Approximately 7,300 (fall 2016) students (as much in the Continuing Education programs) are enrolled in the 2 campuses, the main one located in Longueuil and the École nationale d'aérotechnique in St-Hubert campuses. It is affiliated with the ACCC, and CCAA.

== History ==
The school was established in 1950 as a religious owned school called Externat classique de Longueuil. In 1967, several institutions were merged and became public ones, when the Quebec system of public colleges was created, including the Cégep Édouard-Montpetit, named after the Quebec lawyer and academic, Édouard Montpetit

== Sports ==
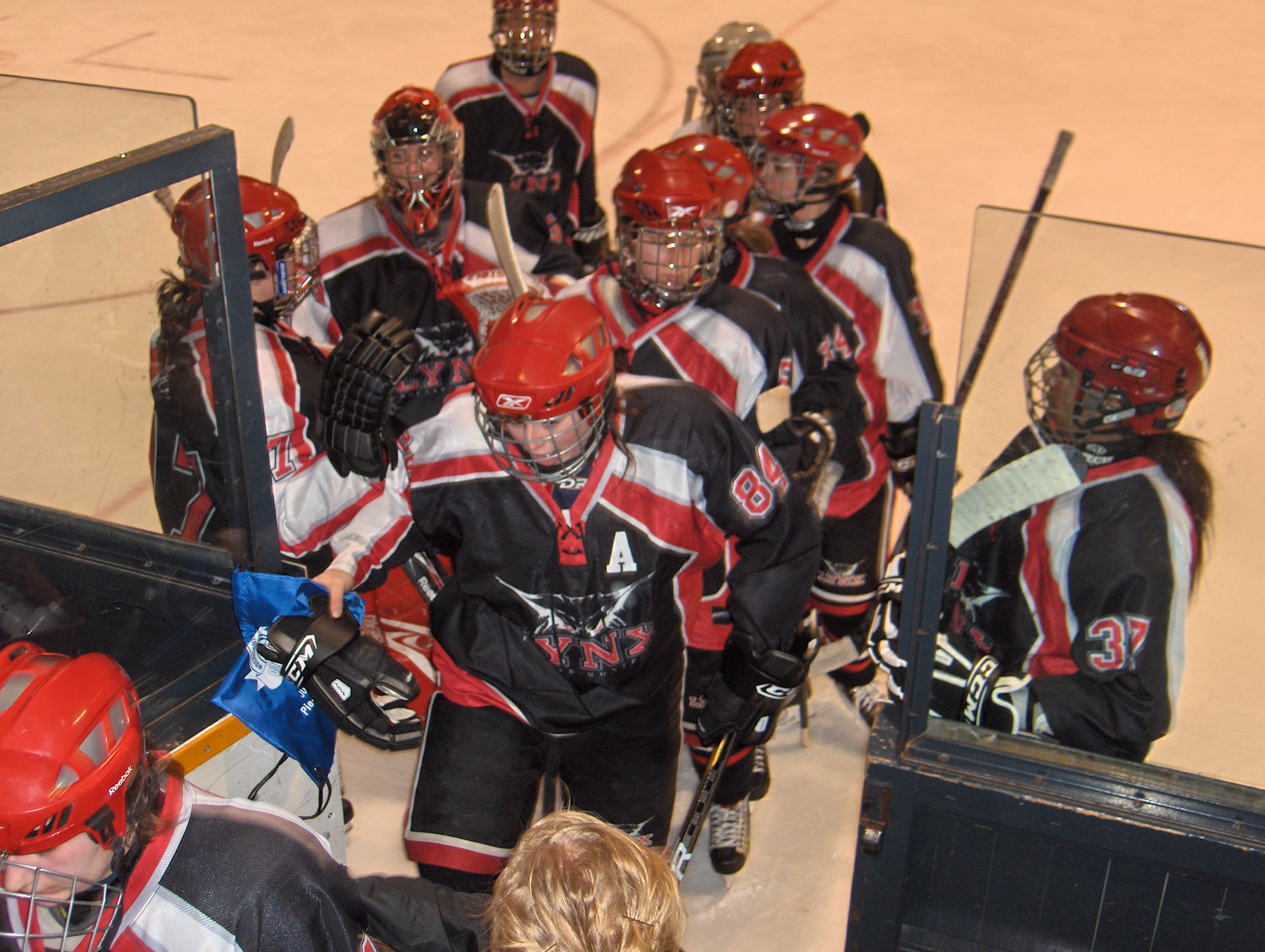
Lynx du Cégep Édouard-Montpetit

The Cégep Édouard-Montpetit's eighteen athletic teams are known as the Lynx. The CÉGEP is represented at the provincial level by five teams: division 1 women's and men's basketball and women's volleyball, and women's ice hockey and men's football in division 2. Thirteen teams compete for Cégep Édouard-Montpetit at the league conference level: badminton, baseball, women's and men's basketball division 2, cheerleading, cross country, golf, women's flag football, women's and men's soccer division 2, and women's and men's volleyball division 2.

== Programs ==
The CEGEP offers two types of programs: pre-university and technical. The pre-university programs, which take two years to complete, cover the subject matter which roughly corresponds to the additional year of high school plus the first year of university given elsewhere in Canada. The technical programs, which take three years to complete, applies to students who wish to pursue a skill trade. In addition, Continuing Education for adults and services to businesses are provided.

The CEGEP is ranked among the top 10 in research.

== École nationale d'aérotechnique ==
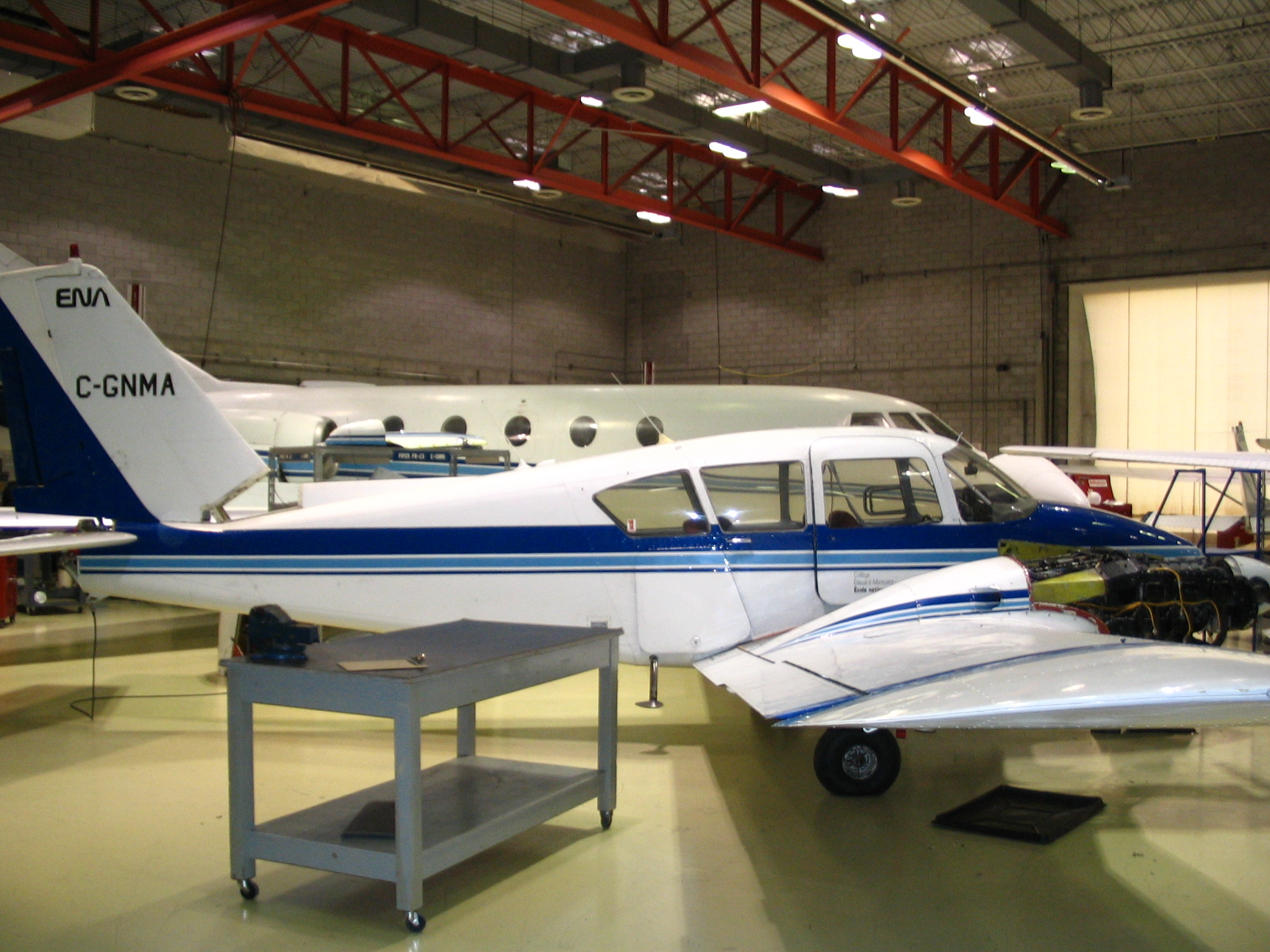
One of the hangars of the École nationale d'aérotechnique.

L'École nationale d'aérotechnique (ÉNA) is a campus of Cégep Édouard-Montpetit located in the vicinity of Saint-Hubert Airport in Saint-Hubert. It is located in close proximity to numerous aeronautical enterprises.

The institution is the largest aerotechnical college in North America and the only institution in Quebec to offer comprehensive training in avionics, Aerospace Engineering and aircraft maintenance (including an aircraft maintenance program offered in English). It has a fleet of 37 aircraft including two Learjets and two Bombardier Challenger. The school has also received a Bombardier CS100 donated by the company.

== Montreal Metro expansion ==
In late 2008, the former mayor of Longueuil, Claude Gladu had planned for a Montreal Metro extension to Cégep Édouard-Montpetit on the Yellow Line. In 2013, the project is still on the rail in a far future.

== See also ==
- List of colleges in Quebec
- Higher education in Quebec
