= Dawson College Blues women's ice hockey =

Canadian CÉGEP ice hockey team

- University: Dawson College
- Conference: RSEQ
- Head coach: Jonathan Lazure since 2025–26 season
- Assistant coaches: Léa McIntyre; Erica Starnino; Devon Thompson; Gabriel Maheu-Cyr
- Arena: Ed Meagher Arena; Montreal, Quebec
- Colors: Blue and White

The Dawson College Blues women's ice hockey team represents Dawson College in the Hockey collégial féminin RSEQ. Their home games are contested at the Ed Meagher Arena (on the Loyola campus of Concordia University) in the west of downtown Montreal, Quebec, Canada.

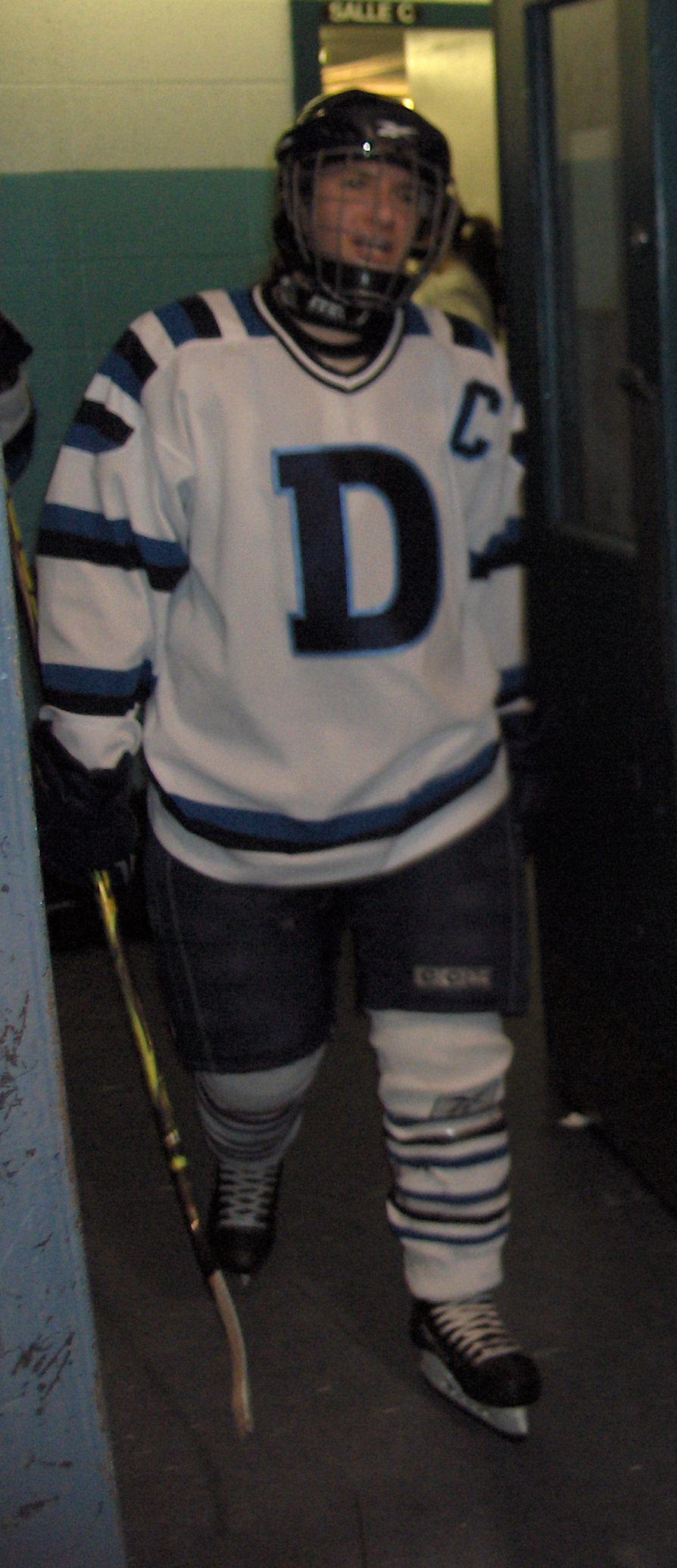
Team captain leading the team onto the ice.

== Team history ==
The women's ice hockey team was founded in 1998 by Lionel Geiller. The team would play exhibition games in 1998 and join the Ligue de hockey féminin collégial AA in 1999 to play competitively.

Goaltender Alexandra Garcia led the Blues to the finals in the 2005 Canadian Championships (held in British Columbia). Garcia was named the Player of the Game in the semifinals and finals. For the 2006–07 season, Garcia won the collegiate championship as she posted a 34-0-0 record with the Blues. In addition, she competed for Team Quebec at the 2007 Canada Winter Games and won a bronze medal.

Vanessa Emond played at Dawson College from 2006 to 2008. She accumulated 75 points in her first year (45 goals, 30 assists) for the College. The following season, she had 65 points (34 goals, 31 assists). She was named the Most Valuable Player of her team and represented Team Quebec twice. Camille Dumais was a two-year member of Dawson College in Montreal and was an assistant captain in 2008–09.

Lauriane Rougeau helped Dawson to a 31–1 record and a runner-up finish in the Collégial AA playoffs of 2008–09. For the season, she led Dawson defenders in scoring. Dawson competed in the 2009 Junion Women's Hockey League Challenge Cup in Washington, D.C., and Rougeau helped the team win the tournament

== Season-by-season results ==
Note: GP = Games played, W = Wins, L = Losses, T = Ties, OTL = Overtime losses, GF = Goals for, GA = Goals against, Pts = Points.

- Note: Statistics are not available for years prior to the 2004–05 season.

-
Year	GP	W	L	T	OTL	GF	GA	Pts
1999–2000								
2000–01								
2001–02								
2002–03								
2003–04								
2004–05	21	7	12	1	1	35	65	16
2005–06	27	23	4	0	0	125	37	46
2006–07	27	27	0	0	0	179	42	54
2007–08	27	24	3	0	0	157	44	48
2008–09	24	24	0	0	0	159	19	48
2009–10	21	11	7	0	3	59	62	25
2010–11	20	14	5	0	1	64	40	29
2011–12								

== Season standings ==
- Note: Statistics are not available for years prior to the 2004-05 season.

= Indicates First Place finish

= Indicates championship

Year	Reg. season	Playoffs
1999–2000		
2000–01		
2001–02		
2002–03		
2003–04		
2004–05	6th	Did not qualify
2005–06	2nd	eliminated in Demi-finals
2006–07	1st Overall	Won the Championship
2007–08	2nd	lost in Final games
2008–09	1st Overall	lost in Final games
2009–10	4th	eliminated in first round
2010–11	3rd	4th
2011–12		

== Playoff results ==
Following the regular season, a playoff was held to determine the Collégial women's champion in Quebec.

=== Playoff 2010–11 ===
==== First round ====
GP = Games played, W = Wins, L = Losses, OTL = Overtime losses, GF = Goals for, GA = Goals against, Pts = Points.

GP	W	L	OTL	GF	GA	Pts
6	3	2	1	16	17	9

- The Dawson Blues finished second in group B, and qualified for the semi-finals.

==== Semi-finals and Championship Final game ====
Playoff	Date	Time	Teams	Attendance
Semi-final	April 2	3:30 pm	Dawson Blues 0 - 4 Lynx Édouard-Montpetit	450 supporters
Semi-Final	April 2	5:30pm	Patriotes St-Laurent 2 - 1 (wins in shootout) Titans Limoilou	400 supporters
Final Bronze Medal	April 3	12:30 noon	Titans Limoilou 2 -0 Dawson Blues	280 supporters
Final Gold Medal	April 3	3:00 pm	Patriotes St-Laurent 5 - 2 Lynx Édouard-Montpetit	420 supporters

=== Playoff 2009-10 ===
==== First round ====
GP = Games played, W = Wins, L = Losses, OTL = Overtime losses, GF = Goals for, GA = Goals against, Pts = Points.

GP	W	L	OTL	GF	GA	Pts
7	3	3	1	16	18	10

- The Dawson Blues finish 5th in the group. The Blues were elimined in the first round and did not qualify for the semi-finals.

=== Playoffs 2008-09 ===
==== Semi-finals and Championship Final game ====
Playoff	Date	Teams
Semi-Final	April 11	Dawson Blues 6-2 Titans Limoilou
Semi-final	April 11	Lynx Édouard-Montpetit 7-1 Dragons Laflèche
Final Gold Medal	April 12	Lynx Édouard-Montpetit 3 - 2 (wins in shootout) Dawson Blues

=== Playoffs 2007-08 ===
==== Championship final games ====
Playoff	Date	Teams
Final Gold Medal	April 4	Dawson Blues 3 - 8 Cheminots St-Jérôme
Final Gold Medal	April 11	Cheminots St-Jérôme 6-2 Dawson Blues

=== Playoffs 2006-07 ===
==== Championship final games ====
Playoff	Date	Teams
Final Gold Medal	April 5	Cheminots St-Jérôme 1 - 2 Dawson Blues
Final Gold Medal	April 10	Dawson Blues 3 - 2 Cheminots St-Jérôme

winner:Dawson Blues

== Current roster 2011-12 ==
Goaltenders
Number	Player
29	Jade Routhier
30	Melanie Fournier

Defensemen
Number	Player
4	Michele Baylis-Lopresti
6	Cassandra Poudrier
12	Alexa Brown
16	Konwakerton Beauvais
20	Rebecca Laganiere
27	Joelle Ferlatte
77	Alessandra Bravi

Forwards
Number	Player
3	Sina Bourbeau
11	Karel Laplante
14	Jenifer Pouliot
19	Gabrielle Davidson
21	Valerie Wade
47	Alexandria D'Onofrio
76	Audrey Ann Boutour
94	Devon Thompson

== Coaching staff 2011-12 ==
- Athletic Coordinator: Paul Rastelli
- Head Coach: Scott Lambton
- Assistant Coach: Andrea Lambton
- Assistant Coach: Emmanuelle Blais
- Assistant Coach: Alyssa Cecere
- Goalie Coach: Kim St Pierre
- Off-Ice Trainer: John D'Amico

== Team awards and honors ==
- 2006-07 Ligue de hockey féminin collégial AA Championship.

== Individual awards and honors ==
Awards and individual honors are not available for seasons prior to 2008-09.

2010–11 season

- Rookie of the Year Award: Cassandra Poudrier
- 2 Blues were named to All-Star teams: Gabrielle Davidson (forward), Cassandra Poudrier (defensemen),

Season 2009–10

- 2 Blues were named to All-Star teams: Audrey Gariépy (forward), Laurie-Anne Ménard (defensemen).

Season 2008–09

- Player of the Year Award: Marie-Philip Poulin
- Rookie of the Year Award: Marie-Philip Poulin
- 4 Blues were named to All-Star teams: Marie-Philip Poulin (forward), Vanessa Gagnon (forward), Lauriane Rougeau (defensemen), Émy Côté (goaltender).

=== Retired numbers ===
In 2010, Marie-Philip Poulin and Catherine Ward would get their Dawson College numbers retired.

Player	Number
Marie-Philip Poulin	10
Catherine Ward	17

== Notable former players ==
- Emmanuelle Blais
- Catherine Ward
- Ann-Sophie Bettez
- Marie-Philip Poulin

=== Blues in NCAA ===
Player	Position	School	Years
Emmanuelle Blais*	Forward	Minnesota Duluth Bulldogs	2006-10
Émy Côté	Goaltender	Manhattanville Valiants	2009-12
Audrey Cournoyer	Forward	Minnesota Duluth Bulldogs	2009–present
Stephanie Denino	Defense	Princeton Tigers	2006-10
Camille Dumais	Forward	Dartmouth Big Green	2010–present
Karell Emard	Forward	St. Lawrence Saints	2007-11
Vanessa Emond	Forward	St. Lawrence Saints	2008-12
Alexandra Garcia	Goaltender	Connecticut Huskies	2008-12
Lauren Nutkevitch	Defense	Manhattanville Valiants	2009-12
Marie-Philip Poulin	Forward	Boston University Terriers	2010–present
Lauriane Rougeau	Forward	Cornell Big Red	2009–present
Catherine Ward	Defense	Boston University Terriers	2010–present

*Blais would win NCAA championships in 2008 and 2010, respectively.

=== International ===
Player	Position	Event	Result
Ann-Sophie Bettez	Forward	2009 IIHF worlds	Silver
Lauriane Rougeau	Forward	2011 MLP Nations Cup	Gold

=== Olympic hockey ===
Player	Position	Event	Result
Marie-Philip Poulin	Forward	2010 Winter Olympics	Gold
Catherine Ward	Defense	2010 Winter Olympics	Gold

== See also ==
- Hockey collégial féminin RSEQ
- Coupe Dodge
