= Cégep Limoilou Titans women's ice hockey =

Titan's logo

The Titans du Cégep Limoilou represent Cégep Limoilou and are a women's ice hockey team that compete in the Hockey collégial féminin RSEQ. The team plays its home games in l’Arpidrome de Charlesbourg.

== History ==
The Titans were created in 1999 and played their first season in autumn 2000. The team had 2 consecutive provincial championships. In the Coupe Dodge 2009, the Titans du Cégep Limoilou won a bronze medal in a 4-0 victory over Collège Lafleche. Lisa-Marie L'Heureux had five goals and four assists for nine points during the postseason. For the season, she scored 21 goals and had 12 assists for 33 points in only 24 games. Her 33 points ranked seventh in the Ligue de hockey féminin collégial AA among all scorers but first among all league defenders. In addition, her 33 points led the team.

== Championship playoff ==
Following the regular season, a playoff is held to determine the Collégial women's champion in Quebec. A list of collégial winners includes (winner is in bold):

=== Playoff 2010-11 ===
- The semi-finals and the finals was presented at the Centre Étienne Desmarteau

| **Playoff** | **Date** | **Time** | **Teams** | **Attendance** |
| Semi-final | April 2 | 3:30 pm | Lynx Édouard-Montpetit 4-0 Dawson Blues | 450 supporters |
| Semi-Final | April 2 | 5:30pm | Patriotes St-Laurent 2-1 (wins in shootout) Titans Limoilou | 400 supporters |
| Final Bronze Medal | April 3 | 12:30 noon | Titans Limoilou 2-0 Dawson Blues | 280 supporters |
| Final Gold Medal | April 3 | 3:00 pm | Patriotes St-Laurent 5-2 Lynx Édouard-Montpetit | 420 supporters |

winner: Patriotes du Cégep St-Laurent

=== Playoff 2009-10 ===
- Semi-finals and Championship Final game 2010

| **Playoff** | **Date** | **Teams** |
| Semi-Final | April 3 | Cheminots Saint-Jérôme 2 - 4 Lynx Édouard-Montpetit |
| Semi-final | April 3 | Titans Limoilou 3 - 4 Dragons Laflèche |
| Final Bronze Medal | April 4 | Cheminots Saint-Jérôme 2 - 1 Titans Limoilou |
| Final Gold Medal | April 4 | Dragons Laflèche 5 - 6 Lynx Édouard-Montpetit |

winner: Lynx du Collège Édouard-Montpetit

=== Playoffs 2008-09 ===
- Semi-finals and Championship Final game

| **Playoff** | **Date** | **Teams** |
| Semi-Final | April 11 | Dawson Blues 6-2 Titans Limoilou |
| Semi-final | April 11 | Lynx Édouard-Montpetit 7-1 Dragons Laflèche |
| Final Bronze Medal | April 12 | Titans Limoilou 4 - 0 Dragons Laflèche |
| Final Gold Medal | April 12 | Lynx Édouard-Montpetit 3 - 2 (wins in shootout) Dawson Blues |

winner:Lynx du Collège Édouard-Montpetit

== Awards and honors ==
- Joannie Lebrun, Goaltender, Collegial AA First Team All-Star, 2010–11
- Emmanuelle Dumont, Forward, Collegial AA Second Team All-Star, 2010–11
- Emmanuelle Dumont, Collegial AA Sportsmanship Award, 2010–11
- Emmanuelle Dumont, Collegial AA Academic All-Star, 2010–11
- Joannie Lebrun, Goaltender, Collegial AA First Team All-Star, 2010–11
- Vanessa Laplante, Defense, Collegial AA First Team All-Star, 2009–10
- Emmanuelle Dumont, Forward, Collegial AA Second Team All-Star, 2009–10
- Marie-Andrée Marchand, Goaltender, Collegial AA Second Team All-Star, 2009–10
- Emmanuelle Dumont, Collegial AA Sportsmanship Award, 2009–10
- Raphaelle Cardinal, Collegial AA Academic All-Star, 2009–10
- Lisa-Marie L’Heureux, Defense, Collegial AA First Team All-Star, 2008–09
- Emmanuelle Dumont, Forward, Collegial AA First Team All-Star, 2008–09
- Marie-Hélène Suc, Defense, Collegial AA First Team All-Star, 2008–09
- Raphaëlle Cardinal, Collegial AA Academic All-Star, 2008–09

== Coaching staff 2011-12 ==
- Head Coach: Pascal Dufresne
- Assistant Coach: Alex dubois
- Assistant Coach: Sébastien Guérin
- Assistant Coach: Emmanuelle Dumont

== See also ==
- Hockey collégial féminin RSEQ
- Coupe Dodge
