= Fillon (surname) =

Fillon is a French surname.

== Geographical distribution ==
As of 2014, 87.7% of all known bearers of the surname Fillon were residents of France (frequency 1:13,873), 3.4% of Argentina (1:228,575), 3.2% of the United States (1:2,076,157) and 3.1% of the Philippines (1:599,032).

In France, the frequency of the surname was higher than national average (1:13,873) in the following regions:

1. Centre-Val de Loire (1:4,489)
2. Nouvelle-Aquitaine (1:6,248)
3. Auvergne-Rhône-Alpes (1:6,802)
4. Pays de la Loire (1:8,585)

== People ==
- Jean Fillon, known as Jean de Venette (c. 1307 – c. 1370), 14th century French Carmelite friar and author
- Benjamin Fillon (1819–1881), a French numismatist and archaeologist
- François Fillon (born 1954), the 116th Prime Minister of France
- Madeleine Fillon (fl. 1718), French madam
- Nathan Fillon, Canadian-American actor
- Penelope Fillon, wife of François Fillon
- Jean-Luc Fillon, a French oboist
