= Cégep Limoilou =

Public college in Quebec City, Quebec

Coordinates: 46°49′47.99″N 71°13′40.88″W

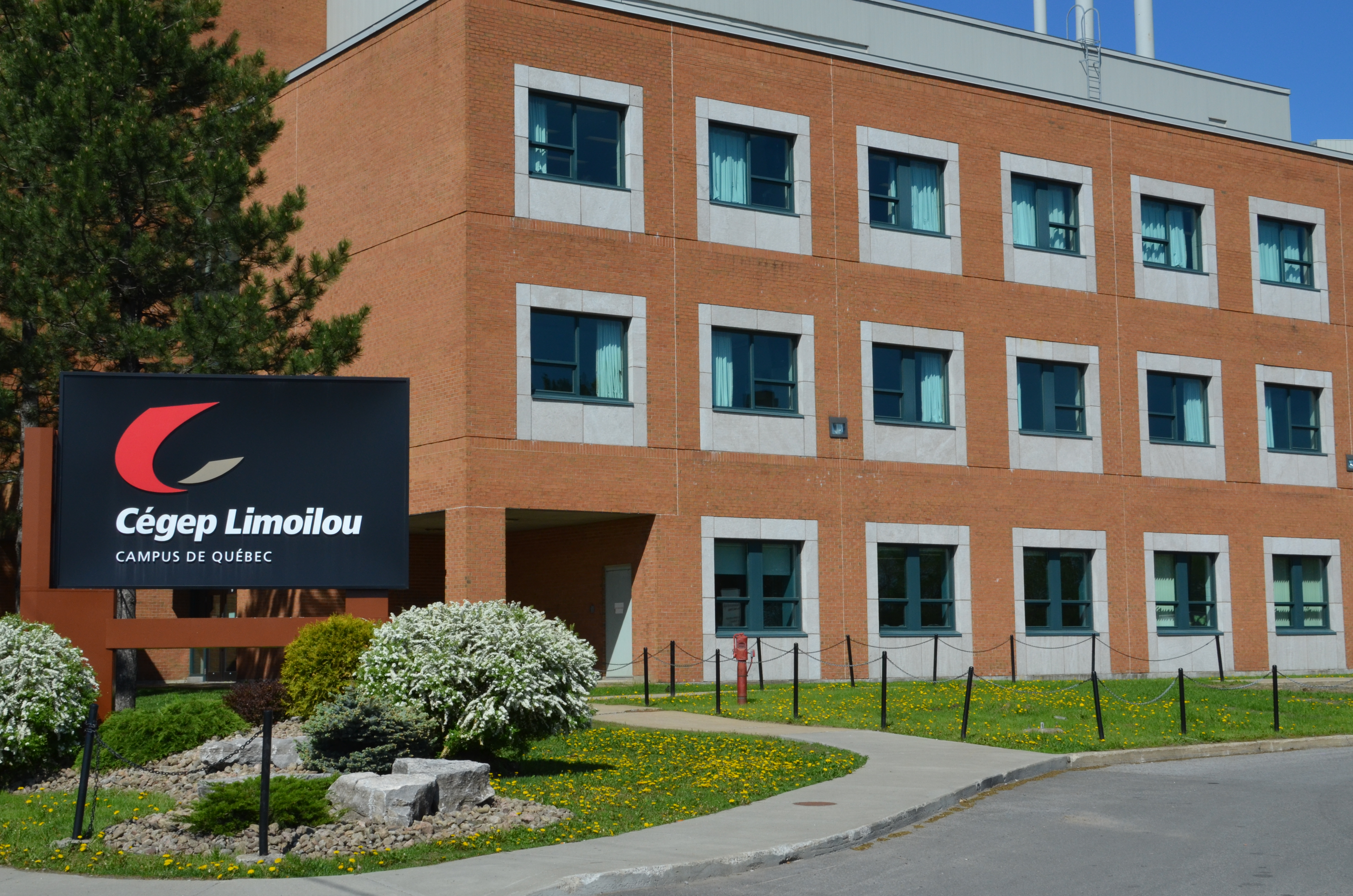
- Motto: Le Cégep Limoilou, le Cégep en ville
- Motto in English: The Cégep Limoilou, the Cégep in town
- Type: public CEGEP
- Established: 1967
- Affiliations: ACCC, CCAA, QSSF
- Administrative staff: 750
- Students: 3 500 pre-university; 3 000 technical
- Undergraduates: pre-university students; technical
- Location: 1300, 8e avenue Quebec City, Quebec, Canada; G1J 5L5
- Campus: Two Urban/Suburban campuses
- Colours: black & Red
- Website: www.climoilou.qc.ca/

Cégep Limoilou is a French-language CEGEP in the province of Quebec, situated in La Cité-Limoilou, a borough of Quebec City.

Cégep Limoilou offers pre-university and technical programs, continuing education and corporate services. It has 6 faculties and 43 programs leading to a Diploma of College Studies (DEC) and 20 programs lead to an Attestation of College Studies (AEC).

== Programs ==
- Pre-university programs (DEC), which take two years to complete, cover the subject matter which roughly corresponds to the additional year of high school given elsewhere in Canada in preparation for a chosen field in university.
  - Visual Arts
  - Creative Arts
    - Communication, cinema and creativity
    - Languages
    - Theatre
    - International Stakes and Languages (Double DEC)
  - Natural Sciences
    - Health Sciences
    - Pure and Applied Sciences
  - Computer Sciences and Mathematics
  - Social Sciences
    - Administration and Economic Environment
    - International Stakes
    - Human Development and Society
    - Education
    - International Stakes and Languages (Double DEC)
- Technical programs (DEC): Technical programs, which take three-years to complete, applies to students who wish to pursue a skill trade.
  - 3-D Animation and Image Synthesis
  - Office Automation, Desktop Publishing and Hypermedia
  - Business Management
  - Accounting and Management
  - Electronics
    - Audiovisual
    - Telecommunication
  - Electrical Engineering
  - Industrial Electronics
  - Industrial Engineering
  - Civil Engineering
  - Mechanical Engineering
  - Computerized System
    - Mechanical Manufacturing
    - Drawing-Design
  - Building Services Engineering
  - Geomatic
    - Mapping
    - Geodesy
  - Computer Science
    - Administrative Data Processing
    - Network Management
  - Tourism (Bilingual DEC)
  - Hotel Management
  - Food Service Management
  - Nursing
  - Dietetics
  - Circus Arts
  - Applied Arts
    - Ceramics
    - Artisanal Textile Construction
    - Jewellery
    - Stringed-instrument (Violin or Guitar)
    - Sculpture
- Certificates (AEC)
  - Nursing
  - 3-D Animation
  - Office Automation and Accounting
  - Business Management
  - Financial Management and Electronic Accounting System
  - Company Supervision
  - Multimedia Production
  - Video Game Design
  - Computer-aided Design and Manufacturing
  - Sale and Merchandise
  - Human Resources Supervision
  - Network Architecture and Management
  - Advanced Cisco Routers Management
  - Advanced Network Security
  - Advanced Telephony over IP
  - Telecommunication
  - Programmer Analyst
  - Geomatics
    - Mapping
  - Quality Control of Civil Engineering Materials

== Faculties ==
Campus de Québec (Head office) 1300, 8^{e} Avenue, Quebec, Quebec G1J 5L5 418.647.6600

Campus de Charlesbourg 7600, 3^{e} Avenue Est, Quebec, Quebec G1H 7L4 418.647.6600

Pavillon des métiers d'art 299, 3e Avenue, Québec (Québec) G1L 2V7 418.647.0567

Maison des métiers d'art 367, boulevard Charest Est, Québec (Québec) G1K 3H3 418.524.7337

Institut québécois d'ébénisterie 14, rue Soumande, bureau 1-14, Québec (Québec) G1L 0A4 418.525.7060

École de cirque de Québec 750, 2e Avenue, Québec (Québec) G1L 3B7 418.525.0101

The College of General and Vocational Education is affiliated with the ACCC and CCAA.

== History ==
In 1967, several institutions were merged and became public ones, when the Quebec system of CEGEPs was created.

== See also ==
- List of colleges in Quebec
- Higher education in Quebec
- Titans du Cégep Limoilou women's ice hockey
