= NCAA Division III women's ice hockey tournament =

- Sport: College ice hockey
- Number of teams: 13
- Format: Single-elimination tournament
- Current stadium: Hunt Arena
- Current location: River Falls, Wisconsin
- Played: 2002–present
- Last contest: 2026
- Current champion: Wisconsin–River Falls (3)
- Most championships: Plattsburgh State (7)
- TV partner: NCAA.com
- Official website: https://www.ncaa.com/sports/icehockey-women/d3

The annual NCAA Division III women's ice hockey tournament is the college ice hockey tournament which is held in the United States by the National Collegiate Athletic Association to determine the top women's team in the NCAA. The 2020 and 2021 championships were canceled due to the COVID-19 pandemic.

== Origins ==
The NCAA Division III championship of women's ice hockey began in 2002.

== NCAA Division III women's ice hockey ==
Seventy-eight schools in the United States, ranging from the Midwest to the East Coast, sponsor varsity women's hockey at the Division III level. Ten conferences are currently recognized by the NCAA—Conference of New England, Massachusetts State Collegiate Athletic Conference, Middle Atlantic Conferences, Minnesota Intercollegiate Athletic Conference, New England Hockey Conference, New England Small College Athletic Conference, Northern Collegiate Hockey Association, State University of New York Athletic Conference, United Collegiate Hockey Conference, and the Wisconsin Intercollegiate Athletic Conference. As of 2025, eight of the conferences receive automatic bids into the tournament. There are currently two independent teams as of the 2024—2025 season.

== Format ==
This tournament is a single elimination competition of twelve teams. The first round and quarterfinals are hosted at the campuses of the higher seeds. The semi-finals and finals are called the "Women's Frozen Four." The winners of the semi-finals move on to the championship.

== History ==
Year	Champion	Coach	Score	Runner-up	Coach	City	Arena
2002	Elmira	Jamie Wood	2–1	Manhattanville	Nicole Kirnan	Elmira, New York	First Arena
2003	Elmira (2)	Jamie Wood	5–1	Manhattanville	Nicole Kirnan	Elmira, New York	First Arena
2004	Middlebury	Bill Mandigo	2–1	Wisconsin–Stevens Point	Brian Idalski	Middlebury, Vermont	Chip Kenyon Arena
2005	Middlebury (2)	Bill Mandigo	4–3	Elmira	Paul Nemetz-Carlson	Elmira, New York	First Arena
2006	Middlebury (3)	Bill Mandigo	3–1	Plattsburgh State	Kevin Houle	Plattsburgh, New York	Ronald B. Stafford Ice Arena
2007	Plattsburgh State	Kevin Houle	3–1	Middlebury	Bill Mandigo	Plattsburgh, New York	Ronald B. Stafford Ice Arena
2008	Plattsburgh State (2)	Kevin Houle	3–2	Manhattanville	Lauren McAuliffe	Plattsburgh, New York	Ronald B. Stafford Ice Arena
2009	Amherst	Jim Plumer	4–3 (OT)	Elmira	Greg Fargo	Middlebury, Vermont	Chip Kenyon Arena
2010	Amherst (2)	Jim Plumer	7–2	Norwich	Mark Bolding	St. Peter, Minnesota	Lund Arena
2011	Norwich	Mark Bolding	5–2	RIT	Scott McDonald	Rochester, New York	Frank Ritter Memorial Ice Arena
2012	RIT	Scott McDonald	4–1	Norwich	Mark Bolding	Rochester, New York	Frank Ritter Memorial Ice Arena
2013	Elmira (3)	Dean Jackson	4–1	Middlebury	Bill Mandigo	Superior, Wisconsin	Superior Ice Arena
2014	Plattsburgh State (3)	Kevin Houle	9–2	Norwich	Mark Bolding	Plattsburgh, New York	Ronald B. Stafford Ice Arena
2015	Plattsburgh State (4)	Kevin Houle	3–2	Elmira	Dean Jackson	Plattsburgh, New York	Ronald B. Stafford Ice Arena
2016	Plattsburgh State (5)	Kevin Houle	5–1	Wisconsin–River Falls	Joe Cranston	Plattsburgh, New York	Ronald B. Stafford Ice Arena
2017	Plattsburgh State (6)	Kevin Houle	4–3 (OT)	Adrian	Chad Davis	Adrian, Michigan	Arrington Ice Arena
2018	Norwich (2)	Mark Bolding	2–1	Elmira	Tim Crowley	Northfield, Vermont	Kreitzberg Arena
2019	Plattsburgh State (7)	Kevin Houle	4–0	Hamline	Natalie Darwitz	Mendota Heights, Minnesota	St. Thomas Ice Arena
2020	Not held due to the COVID-19 pandemic						
2021	Not held due to the COVID-19 pandemic						
2022	Middlebury (4)	Bill Mandigo	3–2 (OT)	Gustavus Adolphus	Mike Carroll	Middlebury, Vermont	Chip Kenyon Arena
2023	Gustavus Adolphus	Mike Carroll	2–1 (3OT)	Amherst	Jeff Matthews	Amherst, Massachusetts	Orr Rink
2024	Wisconsin–River Falls	Joe Cranston	4–1	Elmira	Greg Haney	River Falls, Wisconsin	Hunt Arena
2025	Wisconsin–River Falls (2)	Joe Cranston	3–1	Amherst	Jeff Matthews	River Falls, Wisconsin	Hunt Arena
2026	Wisconsin–River Falls (3)	Joe Cranston	4–0	Nazareth	Chris Baudo	River Falls, Wisconsin	Hunt Arena
2027						Plattsburgh, New York	Ronald B. Stafford Ice Arena
2028						TBD	

== Team titles ==
Schools that have won the NCAA Championship
7, 4, 3, 2, 1

Team	#	Years
Plattsburgh State	7	2007, 2008, 2014, 2015, 2016, 2017, 2019
Middlebury	4	2004, 2005, 2006, 2022
Elmira	3	2002, 2003, 2013
Wisconsin–River Falls	3	2024, 2025, 2026
Amherst	2	2009, 2010
Norwich	2	2011, 2018
Gustavus Adolphus	1	2023
RIT	1	2012

== Coaching titles ==
Coach	#	Years
Kevin Houle	7	2007, 2008, 2014, 2015, 2016, 2017, 2019
Bill Mandigo	4	2004, 2005, 2006, 2022
Joe Cranston	3	2024, 2025, 2026
Mark Bolding	2	2011, 2018
Jim Plumer	2	2009, 2010
Jamie Wood	2	2002, 2003
Mike Carroll	1	2023
Dean Jackson	1	2013
Scott McDonald	1	2012

== Result by school and year ==
35 teams have appeared in the NCAA DIII Tournament in at least one year starting with 2002. The results for all years are shown in this table below.

The code in each cell represents the furthest the team made it in the respective tournament:

- – Not fielding a division III team
- FR First round (did not exist until 2018)
  - x 2 teams who lost in the 2020 first round before the tournament was canceled.
- QF Quarterfinals
  - x 8 teams selected in 2020 who were in the quarterfinals before the tournament was canceled.
- F4 Frozen Four
  - F4* Teams who won in the third place game before its discontinuation in 2023.
- RU National Runner-up
- CH National Champion

School	Conference as of 2026	#	QF	F4	CG	CH	02	03	04	05	06	07	08	09	10	11	12	13	14	15	16	17	18	19	20	22	23	24	25	26
Plattsburgh State	SUNYAC	21	19	4	8	7			F4*	F4	RU	CH	CH	QF	QF		F4*	F4*	CH	CH	CH	CH	F4	CH	X	F4*	F4	QF	FR	FR
Middlebury	NESCAC	20	20	11	6	4	QF	QF	CH	CH	CH	RU	QF	F4*		F4*	QF	RU		QF	F4	QF	QF		X	CH	QF	F4	F4	
Elmira	UCHC	20	20	12	8	3	CH	CH	QF	RU	QF		F4*	RU	F4*			CH	QF	RU	F4*	QF	RU	QF	X	F4		RU	QF	QF
Wisconsin–River Falls	WIAC	17	16	8	4	3		F4						F4	QF	QF	QF	QF	F4*	F4*	RU	QF		QF	X	QF	QF	CH	CH	CH
Amherst	NESCAC	11	10	6	4	2						F4	QF	CH	CH		QF				QF				X		RU	QF	RU	F4
Norwich	LEC	13	10	8	5	2	–	–	–	–	–	–		QF	RU	CH	RU	QF	RU	F4		F4	CH	FR	X		FR			F4
Gustavus Adolphus	MIAC	18	15	10	2	1	F4*		QF	F4*	F4	QF	QF	QF	F4	F4	F4	F4				F4*	FR		X	RU	CH	QF	FR	
RIT	moved to NC	3	3	2	2	1						QF				RU	CH	–	–	–	–	–	–	–	–	–	–	–	–	–
Manhattanville	UCHC	8	8	4	3	0	RU	RU	F4	QF	QF	QF	RU			QF														
Wisconsin–Stevens Point	WIAC	5	5	3	1	0			RU	QF	F4*	F4*							QF											
Adrian	NCHA	9	8	3	1	0	–	–	–	–	–	–				QF					QF	RU	QF	F4*	X		QF	F4		FR
Hamline	MIAC	3	3	2	1	0	–	–	–	–	–	–	–										F4*	RU						QF
Nazareth	UCHC	5	2	1	1	0	–	–	–	–	–	–	–	–	–	–	–	–	–	–	–	–	–			FR	QF	FR	QF	RU
Bowdoin	NESCAC	5	5	2	0	0	F4	F4*	QF	QF								QF												
St. Thomas	moved to NC	6	6	2	0	0		QF											F4	QF	QF	QF		F4		–	–	–	–	–
Wisconsin–Superior	WIAC	2	2	1	0	0					QF		F4																	
Hamilton	NESCAC	2	2	1	0	0																					F4	QF		
Augsburg	MIAC	2	1	1	0	0																							F4	FR
Wisconsin–Eau Clare	WIAC	4	4	0	0	0																	QF	QF	X	QF				
Endicott	CNE	5	2	0	0	0	–	–	–	–	–	–	–	–	–	–	–	–	–	–				FR	X	QF			FR	FR
Williams	NESCAC	4	3	0	0	0		QF											QF					FR						QF
Colby	NESCAC	3	3	0	0	0																				QF	QF		QF	
Trinity	NESCAC	2	2	0	0	0									QF					QF										
St. Norbert	NCHA	2	2	0	0	0	–	–	–	–	–	–	–	–	–			QF											QF	
Lake Forest	NCHA	2	2	0	0	0													QF	QF										
Wilkes	MAC	2	1	0	0	0	–	–	–	–	–	–	–	–	–	–	–	–	–	–	–	–	–						FR	QF
Saint Mary's	MIAC	1	1	0	0	0	QF																							
Concordia (MN)	MIAC	1	1	0	0	0											QF													
UMass Boston	LEC	1	1	0	0	0	–	–													QF									
Morrisville State	SUNYAC	1	1	0	0	0	–	–	–	–	–	–	–	–	–	–	–	–	–	–			QF							
Aurora	NCHA	1	0	0	0	0	–	–	–	–	–	–	–	–	–	–	–	–	–	–	–	–				FR				
Suffolk	CNE	1	0	0	0	0	–	–	–	–	–	–	–	–	–	–	–	–	–	–	–	–	–				FR			
Cortland	SUNYAC	1	0	0	0	0																						FR		
Western New England	CNE	1	0	0	0	0	–	–	–	–	–	–	–	–	–	–	–	–	–	–	–	–	–	–	–			FR		
Saint Benedict	MIAC	1	0	0	0	0																								FR

== No appearances ==
The following is a list of current Division III teams that have yet to make a tournament appearance.

School	Conference	First season
Albertus Magnus	UCHC	2023–24
Alvernia	MAC	2019–20
Anna Maria	MASCAC	2018–19
Arcadia	MAC	2021–22
Beloit	WIAC	2025–26
Bethel	MIAC	1999–00
Buffalo State	SUNYAC	1999–00
Canton	SUNYAC	2012–13
Castleton	LEC	2004–05
Chatham	UCHC	1998–99
Concordia (WI)	NCHA	2007–08
Curry	CNE	2021–22
Connecticut College	NESCAC	1997–98
Dubuque	NCHA	2023–24
Framingham State	MASCAC	2024–25
Hilbert	UCHC	2022–23
Hood	MAC	2024–25
Johnson & Wales	CNE	2015–16
Keene State	LEC	2024–25
King's	MAC	2017–18
Lawrence	NCHA	2020–21
Lebanon Valley	MAC	2016–17
Marian	NCHA	2009–10
MCLA	MASCAC	2023–24
Milwaukee School of Engineering	NCHA	2024–25
Neumann	MAC	2001–02
New England College	LEC	2002–23
Nichols	CNE	2008–09
Oswego	SUNYAC	2006–07
Plymouth State	LEC	2006–07
Potsdam	SUNYAC	2008–09
Rivier	MASCAC	2021–22
Salve Regina	Independent	1992–93
Salem State	MASCAC	2015–16
Southern Maine	LEC	1998–99
St. Catherine	MIAC	2007–08
St. John Fisher	UCHC	2025–26
St. Olaf	MIAC	2000–01
St. Scholastica	MIAC	2010–11
Stevenson	MAC	2012–13
Trine	NCHA	2017–18
University of New England	CNE	2012–13
Utica	UCHC	2001–02
Wesleyan	NESCAC	1977–78
William Smith	SUNYAC	2014–15
Worcester State	MASCAC	2021–22

== See also ==
- Laura Hurd Award
- NCAA women's ice hockey tournament
- Title IX
- NCAA Division III men's ice hockey tournament
