= NCAA Division III women's ice hockey =

American college ice hockey league

The NCAA Division III women's ice hockey is a college ice hockey competition governed by the National Collegiate Athletic Association (NCAA) as part of the NCAA Division III (DIII or D3). Sixty-seven teams competed in NCAA Division III women's hockey across eight conferences in the 2023–24 season.

== Conferences ==
Schools in the CNE

Conference affiliations and the conferences themselves experienced numerous changes in the later part of the 2010s. The most substantial alterations occurred with the founding of the Colonial Hockey Conference (CHC) in 2015 and the folding of ECAC West in 2017, which precipitated the creation of the Northeast Women's Hockey League (NEWHL) in the same year. The conferences and affiliations presented below are accurate through the 2019–20 season.

A conference with seven or more affiliated programs automatically qualifies for the NCAA DIII Women's Ice Hockey Tournament. In practice, the Massachusetts State Collegiate Athletic Conference (MASCAC) and the Wisconsin Intercollegiate Athletic Conference (WIAC) are the only conferences that do not receive automatic bids for the tournament.

=== Conference of New England ===
Schools in the CNE

The Conference of New England (CNE; known before the 2024–25 season as the Commonwealth Coast Conference) is a college athletic conference which operates in New England. It added women's ice hockey by taking over the former Colonial Hockey Conference (CHC; previously ECAC North Atlantic) in 2020. As of the 2025–26 season, there are seven member programs:

- Curry College (Colonels) – Milton, Massachusetts
- Endicott College (Gulls) – Beverly, Massachusetts
- Johnson & Wales University (Wildcats) – Providence, Rhode Island
- Nichols College (Bison) – Dudley, Massachusetts
- Suffolk University (Rams) – Boston, Massachusetts
- University of New England (Nor'easters) – Biddeford, Maine
- Western New England University (Golden Bears) – Springfield, Massachusetts

=== Little East Conference ===
Schools in the LEC
Schools in the LEC
Schools in the LEC
Schools in the LEC

The Little East Conference, operating in New England, launched its women's ice hockey league for the 2025–26 season. With the formation of the conference, the New England Hockey Conference (NEHC; previously ECAC East) was discontinued. The seven members of the conference include:

- Keene State College (Owls) – Keene, New Hampshire
- New England College (Pilgrims) – Henniker, New Hampshire
- Norwich University (Cadets) – Northfield, Vermont
- Plymouth State University (Panthers) – Plymouth, New Hampshire
- University of Massachusetts Boston (Beacons) – Boston, Massachusetts
- University of Southern Maine (Huskies) – Gorham, Maine
- Vermont State University Castleton (Spartans) – Castleton, Vermont

=== Massachusetts State Collegiate Athletic Conference ===
Schools in the MASCAC

The MASCAC has six members:

- Anna Maria College (Amcats) – Paxton, Massachusetts
- Framingham State University (Rams) – Framingham, Massachusetts
- Massachusetts College of Liberal Arts (Trailblazers) – North Adams, Massachusetts
- Rivier University (Raiders) – Nashua, New Hampshire
- Salem State University (Vikings) – Salem, Massachusetts
- Worcester State University (Lancers) – Worcester, Massachusetts

=== Middle Atlantic Conferences ===
Schools in the MAC
Schools in the MAC

The Middle Atlantic Conferences contain eight members:

- Alvernia University (Golden Wolves) – Reading, Pennsylvania
- Arcadia University (Knights) – Glenside, Pennsylvania
- Hood College (Blazers) – Frederick, Maryland
- King's College (Monarchs) – Wilkes-Barre, Pennsylvania
- Lebanon Valley College (Flying Dutchmen) – Annville, Pennsylvania
- Neumann University (Knights) – Aston, Pennsylvania
- Stevenson University (Mustangs) – Baltimore County, Maryland
- Wilkes University (Colonels) – Wilkes-Barre, Pennsylvania

=== Minnesota Intercollegiate Athletic Conference ===
Schools in the MIAC

The Minnesota Intercollegiate Athletic Conference (MIAC) is a college athletic conference located in Minnesota. The women's ice hockey programs that compete in the MIAC include:

- Augsburg University (Auggies) – Minneapolis, Minnesota
- Bethel University (Royals) – St. Paul, Minnesota
- College of Saint Benedict (Bennies) – St. Joseph, Minnesota
- Concordia College (Cobblers) – Moorhead, Minnesota
- Gustavus Adolphus College (Golden Gusties) – St. Peter, Minnesota
- Hamline University (Pipers) – St. Paul, Minnesota
- Saint Mary's University (Cardinals) – Winona, Minnesota
- St. Catherine University (Wildcats) – St. Paul, Minnesota
- St. Olaf College (Oles) – Northfield, Minnesota
- College of St. Scholastica (Saints) – Duluth, Minnesota

The most recent change to the MIAC membership came after the 2020–21 season, when St. Thomas was expelled from the league and moved to NCAA Division I, joining the Summit League for most sports and the Western Collegiate Hockey Association (WHCA) in women's ice hockey. St. Thomas was replaced by St. Scholastica.

=== New England Small College Athletic Conference ===
Schools in the NESCAC
Schools in the NESCAC
Schools in the NESCAC

The New England Small College Athletic Conference (NESCAC) is a college athletic conference of liberal arts colleges and universities located in New England and New York. The member schools of the NESCAC are often referred to as the "Little Ivies." The women's ice hockey programs competing in the NESCAC are:

- Amherst College (Mammoths) – Amherst, Massachusetts
- Bowdoin College (Polar Bears) – Brunswick, Maine
- Colby College (Mules) – Waterville, Maine
- Connecticut College (Camels) – New London, Connecticut
- Hamilton College (Continentals) – Clinton, New York
- Middlebury College (Panthers) – Middlebury, Vermont
- Trinity College (Bantams) – Hartford, Connecticut
- Wesleyan University (Cardinals) – Middletown, Connecticut
- Williams College (Ephs) – Williamstown, Massachusetts

=== Northern Collegiate Hockey Association ===
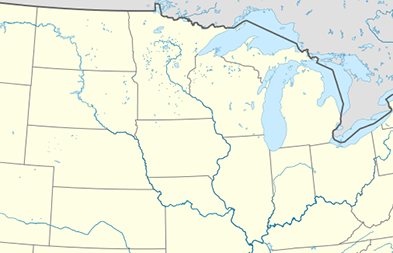
Schools in the NCHA

The Northern Collegiate Hockey Association (NCHA) is a hockey-only conference, which operates in Illinois, Indiana, Iowa, Michigan, and Wisconsin. The women's programs competing in the NCHA are:

- Adrian College (Bulldogs) – Adrian, Michigan
- Aurora University (Spartans) – Aurora, Illinois
- Concordia University Wisconsin (Falcons) – Mequon, Wisconsin
- University of Dubuque (Spartans) – Dubuque, Iowa
- Finlandia University (Lions) – Hancock, Michigan
- Lake Forest College (Foresters) – Lake Forest, Illinois
- Lawrence University (Vikings) – Appleton, Wisconsin
- Marian University (Sabres) – Fond du Lac, Wisconsin
- Milwaukee School of Engineering (Raiders) – Milwaukee, Wisconsin
- St. Norbert College (Green Knights) – De Pere, Wisconsin
- Trine University (Thunder) – Angola, Indiana

=== State University of New York Athletic Conference ===
Schools in the SUNYAC

The SUNYAC, based in New York, absorbed the Northeast Women's Hockey League (NEWHL; successor of ECAC West). The conference has eight members:

- Buffalo State University (Bengals) – Buffalo, New York
- Morrisville State College (Mustangs) – Morrisville, New York
- State University of New York at Canton (Roos) – Canton, New York
- State University of New York at Cortland (Red Dragons) – Cortland, New York
- State University of New York at Oswego (Lakers) – Oswego, New York
- State University of New York at Plattsburgh (Cardinals) – Plattsburgh, New York
- State University of New York at Potsdam (Bears) – Potsdam, New York
- William Smith College (Herons) – Geneva, New York

=== United Collegiate Hockey Conference ===
Schools in the UCHC

The United Collegiate Hockey Conference (UCHC) is a hockey-only conference which operates in the Mid-Atlantic region. The women's programs competing in the UCHC are:

- Albertus Magnus College (Falcons) – New Haven, Connecticut
- Chatham University (Cougars) – Pittsburgh, Pennsylvania
- Elmira College (Soaring Eagles) – Elmira, New York
- Hilbert College (Hawks) – Hamburg, New York
- Manhattanville University (Valiants) – Purchase, New York
- Nazareth University (Golden Flyers) – Pittsford, New York
- St. John Fisher University (Cardinals) – Rochester, New York
- Utica University (Pioneers) – Utica, New York

=== Wisconsin Intercollegiate Athletic Conference ===
Schools in the WIAC

The Wisconsin Intercollegiate Athletic Conference (WIAC) is a collegiate athletics conference in Wisconsin, primarily comprising institutions in the University of Wisconsin System. The women's ice hockey programs participating in the WIAC are:

- Beloit College (Buccaneers) – Beloit, Wisconsin
- University of Wisconsin–Eau Claire (Blugolds) – Eau Claire, Wisconsin
- University of Wisconsin–River Falls (Falcons) – River Falls, Wisconsin
- University of Wisconsin–Stevens Point (Pointers) – Stevens Point, Wisconsin
- University of Wisconsin–Superior (Yellowjackets) – Superior, Wisconsin

=== Independents ===
Independent schools

There is currently one independent team:

- Salve Regina University (Seahawks) – Newport, Rhode Island

== List of champions ==
Year	Champion	Score	Runner-up
2002	Elmira	2–1	Manhattanville
2003	Elmira	5–1	Manhattanville
2004	Middlebury	2–1	UW-Stevens Point
2005	Middlebury	4–3	Elmira
2006	Middlebury	3–1	Plattsburgh
2007	Plattsburgh	2–1	Middlebury
2008	Plattsburgh	3–2	Manhattanville
2009	Amherst	4–3 (OT)	Elmira
2010	Amherst	7–2	Norwich
2011	Norwich	5–2	RIT
2012	RIT	4–1	Norwich
2013	Elmira	1–0	Middlebury
2014	Plattsburgh	9–2	Norwich
2015	Plattsburgh	3–2	Elmira
2016	Plattsburgh	5–1	UW–River Falls
2017	Plattsburgh	4–3 (OT)	Adrian
2018	Norwich	2–1	Elmira
2019	Plattsburgh	4–0	Hamline
2020-2021	Cancelled due to the coronavirus pandemic		
2022	Middlebury	3–2 (OT)	Gustavus Adolphus
2023	Gustavus Adolphus	2–1 (3OT)	Amherst
2024	UW–River Falls	4–1	Elmira
2025	UW–River Falls	3–1	Amherst
2026	UW–River Falls	4–0	Nazareth

== Laura Hurd Award ==
The Laura Hurd Award is an annual award given to the top player in NCAA Division III Women's Ice Hockey as awarded by the American Hockey Coaches Association (AHCA). Since 2007, it has been named after Laura Hurd, a stand-out player for Elmira College who was killed in a car accident. Previously, it was known as the Division III Women's Player of the Year Award.

=== Award winners ===
Year	Winner	Pos.	School
2000	Sylvia Ryan	F	Middlebury College
2001	Michelle Labbe	F	Middlebury College
2002	Sarah Moe	F	Gustavus Adolphus College
2003	Angela Kapus	F/D	Middlebury College
2004	Molly Wasserman	F	Williams College
2005	Laura Hurd	F	Elmira College
2006	Emily Quizon	F	Middlebury College
2007	Andrea Peterson	D	Gustavus Adolphus College
2008	Danielle Blanchard	F	SUNY Plattsburgh
2009	Kayla Coady	F	Elmira College
2010	Isabel Iwachiw	G	Trinity College
2011	Sarah Dagg	F	Rochester Institute of Technology
2012	Julie Fortier	F	Norwich University
2013	Teal Gove	F	SUNY Plattsburgh
2014	Sydney Aveson	G	SUNY Plattsburgh
2015	Ashley Ryan	F	Elmira College
2016	Michelle Greeneway	F	Lake Forest College
2017	Dani Sibley	F	UW-River Falls
2018	Melissa Sheeran	F	SUNY Plattsburgh
2019	Bre Simon	F	Hamline University
2020	Amanda Conway	F	Norwich University
2021	Not awarded		
2022	Callie Hoff	F	UW-River Falls
2023	Darci Matson	F	Aurora University
2024	Maddie McCollins	F	UW-River Falls
2025	Bailey Olson	F	UW-River Falls
2026	Megan Goodreau	F	UW-River Falls

== See also ==
- NCAA Division I Women's Hockey conferences and teams
- National Collegiate women's ice hockey championship
- Women's Hockey Coaches with 250 wins
- Major women's sport leagues in North America
- Title IX
