= 2024 NCAA Division III women's ice hockey tournament =

2024 NCAA Division III Women's ice hockey tournament
- Teams: 11
- Finals site: Hunt Arena, River Falls, Wisconsin
- Champions: Wisconsin–River Falls Falcons (1st title)
- Runner-up: Elmira Soaring Eagles (8th title game)
- Semifinalists: Middlebury Panthers (10th Frozen Four); Adrian Bulldogs (3rd Frozen Four)
- Winning coach: Joe Cranston (1st title)
- MOP: Maddie McCollins (Wisconsin–River Falls)

The 2024 NCAA Division III women's ice hockey tournament was a single-elimination tournament by eleven schools to determine the national champion of women's NCAA Division III college ice hockey. The first round was played on the higher seeds campus on March 6, 2024, and quarterfinals will be played on the campuses of the top 5 seeded teams on March 9, 2024, while the Frozen Four will be played on March 15 and 17, 2024 at the highest remaining seeds campus. The Wisconsin–River Falls Falcons defeated the Elmira Soaring Eagles 4–1 to win their first national championship.

== Qualifying teams ==
2025 Qualifying Teams
MIAC, WIAC, NEHC, NESCAC, CCC, SUNYAC, UCHC, NCHA

The seven winners of their conference tournaments received automatic berths to the tournament. The other four teams were selected at-large. The top five teams are seeded.

Seed	School	Conference	Record	Berth type	Appearance	Last bid
1	Wisconsin–River Falls	WIAC	28–0–0	At-large bid	15th	2023
2	Plattsburgh State	SUNYAC	22–4–1	At-large bid	19th	2023
3	Gustavus Adolphus	MIAC	22–4–0	Tournament champion	17th	2023
4	Amherst	NESCAC	21–3–2	At-large bid	9th	2023
5	Adrian	NCHA	27–2–0	Tournament champion	8th	2023
	Elmira	NEHC	20–7–1	Tournament champion	18th	2022
	Hamilton	NESCAC	15–6–6	At-large bid	2nd	2023
	Middlebury	NESCAC	16–6–4	Tournament champion	19th	2023
	Nazareth	UCHC	22–5–1	Tournament champion	3rd	2023
	Cortland	SUNYAC	20–5–2	Tournament champion	1st	Never
	Western New England	CCC	17–7–3	Tournament champion	1st	Never

=== Bids by state ===
Bids	State	School(s)
5	New York	Cortland, Elmira, Hamilton, Nazareth, Plattsburgh State
1	Massachusetts	Amherst, Western New England
1	Michigan	Adrian
1	Minnesota	Gustavus Adolphus
1	Wisconsin	Wisconsin–River Falls
1	Vermont	Middlebury

== Bracket ==
First Round; March 6
9	Nazareth	1
8	Hamilton	2*
11	Western New England	0
6	Middlebury	8
10	Elmira	3
7	Cortland	1

National Quarterfinals; March 9
8	Hamilton	1
5	Adrian	4
3	Gustavus Adolphus	1
1	Wisconsin–River Falls	2
6	Middlebury	2
2	Plattsburgh State	0
10	Elmira	2*
4	Amherst	1

National Semifinals; March 15
5	Adrian	2
1	Wisconsin–River Falls	3
6	Middlebury	0
10	Elmira	1

National Championship; March 17
1	Wisconsin–River Falls	4
10	Elmira	1

Note: each * denotes one overtime period

== Results ==
=== First Round ===
==== Nazareth vs. Hamilton ====
March 6, 2024; 7:00 PM	Nazareth	2–3 OT (1–1, 0–0, 0–0); OT: (0–1)	Hamilton	Russell Sage Rink, Clinton, New York; Attendance: 537

McKinley Hoff
Goalies
Teagan Brown
Referees:
Tasha Adams
James Visconte
Linesmen:
Heidi Niskanen
Ashley Johnston

Holstad (Wiljanen, Kindred) – 4:11	1–0
	1–1	12:52 – pp – Joseph (Bullock, Ito-Bagshaw)
	1–2	63:47 – Bullock (Romano)

4 min
Penalties
4 min
30
Shots
21

==== Western New England vs. Middlebury ====
March 6, 2024; 7:00 PM	Western New England	0–8 (0–2, 0–4, 0–2)	Middlebury	Chip Kenyon Arena, Middlebury, Vermont; Attendance: 787

Riel Jessie-Gerelli
Goalies
Sophia Will
Referee:
Steven Urbanke
Linesmen:
Kelly Cooke
Stacey Mackinnon

0–1	16:59 – McInerny (Flynn, Kim)
0–2	18:04 – Goniwiecha (Fernandez, McManus)
0–3	22:44 – pp – McInerny (Ziegler, Johnson)
0–4	26:51 – pp – Flynn (Kim, McInerny)
0–5	29:36 – Flynn
0–6	39:08 – Hower (Appleyard, Kim)
0–7	43:49 – Lazar (Coady, Johnson)
0–8	50:23 – Schluter (MacQueen)

6 min
Penalties
0 min
21
Shots
62

==== Elmira vs. Cortland ====
March 6, 2024; 7:00 PM	Elmira	3–1 (1–0, 1–1, 1–0)	Cortland	Alumni Arena, Cortland, New York; Attendance: 817

Chloe Beaubien
Goalies
Molly Goergen
Referee:
Tom Lynch
Linesmen:
Will O'Malley
Justin White

Schmidt – 12:52	1–0
Lenzen (Goleniak, Hoffmann) – pp – 35:40	2–0
	2–1	36:44 – Cramer (Donegan, Delacourt)
Bradbury (Hoffmann) – en – 59:47	3–1

2 min
Penalties
2 min
36
Shots
25

=== Quarterfinals ===
==== Hamilton vs. (5) Adrian ====
March 9, 2024; 3:00 PM	Hamilton	1–4 (1–2, 0–1, 0–1)	Adrian	Arrington Ice Arena, Adrian, Michigan; Attendance: 583

Teagan Brown
Goalies
Michaela O'Brien
Referees:
John Cerza
Nick Schirripa
Linesmen:
Joshua Danielowski
Trevor Hittman

	0–1	11:59 – Crockett (Biddle)
	0–2	13:41 – pp – Lascelle (Bjelland, Roy)
McGennis (Ito-Bagshaw, Romano) – 16:44	1–2
	1–3	37:49 – Lascelle (Roy)
	1–4	49:51 – pp – Lascelle (Roy, Bjelland)

4 min
Penalties
4 min
21
Shots
33

==== (3) Gustavus Adolphus vs. (1) Wisconsin–River Falls ====
March 9, 2024; 2:00 PM	Gustavus Adolphus	1–2 (0–1, 1–0, 0–1)	Wisconsin–River Falls	Hunt Arena, River Falls, Wisconsin; Attendance: 1,739

Katie McCoy
Goalies
Jordan O'Connor
Referees:
Jon Loye
Dan Olson
Linesmen:
Joe Bennek
Sarah Buckner

	0–1	13:02 – Nelvin (Hantge)
Holland (Thompson) – 22:05	1–1
	1–2	46:32 – Lavergne (Hantge, Nelvin)

4 min
Penalties
2 min
20
Shots
28

==== Middlebury vs. (2) Plattsburgh State ====
March 9, 2024; 3:00 PM	Middlebury	2–0 (1–0, 1–0, 0–0)	Plattsburgh State	Ronald B. Stafford Ice Arena, Plattsburgh, New York; Attendance: 923

Sophia Will	Goalies	Lilla Nease	Referee: William O'Malley; Linesmen: Courtney Drennan; Ryan Boylan
Lazar (Hower, Kim) – 10:40 / 1–0; Flynn (Ferraris, Kim) – 27:32 / 2–0			Referee: William O'Malley; Linesmen: Courtney Drennan; Ryan Boylan
8 min	Penalties	10 min	Referee: William O'Malley; Linesmen: Courtney Drennan; Ryan Boylan
19	Shots	30	Referee: William O'Malley; Linesmen: Courtney Drennan; Ryan Boylan

==== Elmira vs. (4) Amherst ====
March 9, 2024; 3:00 PM	Elmira	2–1 OT (0–0, 1–0, 0–1); OT: (1–0)	Amherst	Orr Rink, Amherst, Massachusetts; Attendance: 320

Chloe Beaubien
Goalies
Natalie Stott
Referee:
Jessica Gilbert
Linesmen:
Melissa Peri
Danika Korpacz

Bradbury (Lugge, Lenzen) – 33:17	1–0
	1–1	53:09 – pp – Xu (Baxter, Glennon)
Lenzen (Lugge, Bradbury) – 69:51	2–1

12 min
Penalties
4 min
31
Shots
44

=== Semifinals ===
==== Elmira vs. Middlebury ====
March 15, 2024; 4:00 PM	Elmira	1–0 (0–0, 0–0, 1–0)	Middlebury	Hunt Arena, River Falls, Wisconsin; Attendance: 489

Chloe Beaubien	Goalies	Sophia Will	Referee: Samantha Hiller; Linesmen: Michaela Bahl; Joe Bennek
Meeder (Goleniak, Riva) – 55:34 / 1–0			Referee: Samantha Hiller; Linesmen: Michaela Bahl; Joe Bennek
12 min	Penalties	2 min	Referee: Samantha Hiller; Linesmen: Michaela Bahl; Joe Bennek
20	Shots	31	Referee: Samantha Hiller; Linesmen: Michaela Bahl; Joe Bennek

==== (5) Adrian vs. (1) Wisconsin–River Falls ====
March 15, 2024; 7:00 PM	Adrian	2–3 (1–1, 1–0, 0–2)	Wisconsin–River Falls	Hunt Arena, River Falls, Wisconsin; Attendance: 1,413

Michaela O'Brien
Goalies
Jordan O'Connor
Referees:
Will O'Malley
Tasha Adams
Linesmen:
Danika Korpacz
Jake Caneff

Lascelle (Pietrucha) – 15:39	1–0
	1–1	15:47 – Lavergne (Hantge)
Bjelland (Cadorette) – 38:11	2–1
	2–2	45:43 – McCollins (Sathers)
	2–3	58:10 – Olson (Brice, Eckers)

6 min
Penalties
2 min
24
Shots
45

=== Championship ===
==== Elmira vs. (1) Wisconsin–River Falls ====
March 17, 2024; 3:00 PM	Elmira	1–4 (0–0, 1–1, 0–3)	Wisconsin–River Falls	Hunt Arena, River Falls, Wisconsin; Attendance: 1,789

Chloe Beaubien
Goalies
Jordan O'Connor
Referees:
Will O'Malley
Tasha Adams
Linesmen:
Joe Bennek
Sarah Buckner

	0–1	28:56 – pp – Aure (Nelvin, McCollins)
Bradbury (Lenzen) – 30:36	1–1
	1–2	46:50 – Dunn
	1–3	47:26 – Lavergne (Ronn, Hantge)
	1–4	52:01 – Hantge (Nelvin, Eckers)

9 min
Penalties
6 min
17
Shots
37

== See also ==
- NCAA Division III women's ice hockey tournament
- 2024 NCAA Division III men's ice hockey tournament
