= 2026 NCAA Division III women's ice hockey tournament =

2026 NCAA Division III Women's ice hockey tournament
- Teams: 13
- Finals site: Hunt Arena, River Falls, Wisconsin
- Champions: Wisconsin–River Falls Falcons (3rd title)
- Runner-up: Nazareth Golden Flyers (1st title game)
- Semifinalists: Norwich Cadets (8th Frozen Four); Amherst Mammoths (6th Frozen Four)
- Winning coach: Joe Cranston (3rd title)
- MOP: MaKenna Aure (Wisconsin–River Falls)

The 2026 NCAA Division III women's ice hockey tournament was a single-elimination tournament with thirteen schools to determine the national champion of women's NCAA Division III college ice hockey. The first round was played on the campuses of the higher seeds on March 14, 2026, and quarterfinals will be played on the campuses of the top three seeded teams and highest remaining unranked team on March 21, 2026. The Frozen Four was played on March 27 and 29 at Hunt Arena in River Falls, Wisconsin.

The Wisconsin–River Falls Falcons won their third consecutive national championship, defeating the Nazareth Golden Flyers by a score of 4–0.

== Qualifying teams ==
2025 Qualifying Teams
MIAC, WIAC, LEC, NESCAC, CNE, SUNYAC, UCHC, NCHA, MAC,

The eight winners of their conference tournaments will receive automatic berths to the tournament. The other five teams will be selected at-large. The top three teams are seeded.

Seed	School	Conference	Record	Berth type	Appearance	Last bid
1	Wisconsin–River Falls	WIAC	27–1–0	At-large bid	17th	2025
2	Norwich	LEC	25–2–0	Tournament champion	13th	2023
3	Nazareth	UCHC	25–1–1	At-large bid	5th	2025
	Adrian	NCHA	24–5–0	Tournament champion	9th	2024
	Amherst	NESCAC	19–2–6	Tournament champion	11th	2025
	Augsburg	MIAC	21–4–1	At-large bid	2nd	2025
	Elmira	UCHC	19–5–2	Tournament champion	20th	2025
	Endicott	CNE	21–4–2	Tournament champion	5th	2025
	Hamline	MIAC	20–5–1	At-large bid	3rd	2019
	Plattsburgh State	SUNYAC	20–6–1	Tournament champion	21st	2025
	Saint Benedict	MIAC	16–7–4	Tournament champion	1st	Never
	Wilkes	MAC	24–1–1	Tournament champion	2nd	2025
	Williams	NESCAC	17–4–5	At-large bid	4th	2019

=== Bids by state ===
Bids	State	School(s)
3	Massachusetts	Amherst, Endicott, Williams
3	Minnesota	Augsburg, Hamline, Saint Benedict
2	New York	Elmira, Nazareth
1	Michigan	Adrian
1	Pennsylvania	Wilkes
1	Vermont	Norwich
1	Wisconsin	Wisconsin–River Falls

== Bracket ==
First Round; March 14
Plattsburgh State	1
Williams	2*
Saint Benedict	1
Amherst	2*
Elmira	3
Augsburg	1
Endicott	0
Hamline	3
Adrian	1
Wilkes	2

Quarterfinals; March 21
Williams	0
1	Wisconsin–River Falls	1
Amherst	3
Elmira	0
Hamline	0
2	Norwich	1
Wilkes	1
3	Nazareth	2*

Semifinals; March 27
1	Wisconsin–River Falls	3
Amherst	1
2	Norwich	4
3	Nazareth	5*

Championship; March 29
1	Wisconsin–River Falls	4
3	Nazareth	0

Note: each * denotes one overtime period

== Results ==
=== First Round ===
==== Plattsburgh State at Williams ====
March 14, 2026; 3:00 pm	Plattsburgh State	1–2 OT (0–0, 1–0, 0–1); OT: (0–1)	Williams	Lansing Chapman Rink, Williamstown, Massachusetts

Maddy Stetson
Goalies
Erin Pye
Referees:
Ryan St. Louis
Sarah Hickman
Linesman:
Kelly Harris

Mackellar (Puc, Balfour) – 25:19	1–0
	1–1	42:26 – Fetherston (Bond)
	1–2	63:18 – Littlewood (Gallagher, Mead)

4 min
Penalties
6 min
29
Shots
24

==== Saint Benedict at Amherst ====
March 14, 2026; 3:00 pm	Saint Benedict	1–2 OT (0–0, 1–0, 0–1); OT: (0–1)	Amherst	Orr Rink, Amherst, Massachusetts; Attendance: 313

Lexi Badali
Goalies
Natalie Stott
Referees:
Matt Berg
Marissa Peri
Linesmen:
Stacey MacKinnon
Jeny Collins

Jusczak (Lewis, Stinnett) – pp – 20:40	1–0
	1–1	47:28 – Abban (Brown, Flynn)
	1–2	62:36 – Dann (Fu)

8 min
Penalties
4 min
25
Shots
45

==== Adrian at Wilkes ====
March 14, 2026; 3:00 pm	Adrian	1–2 (0–1, 1–1, 0–0)	Wilkes	Toyota SportsPlex, Wilkes-Barre, Pennsylvania; Attendance: 198

Kiera Stack
Goalies
Audrey Milne
Referees:
Bree Kraut
Alexander Glushek
Linesmen:
Nosike Onyemaobim
Mason Hoeffner

	0–1	18:24 – Ferry (Zingaro)
	0–2	26:57 – Bush (Hudakova)
Ben (Simon) – pp – 34:36	1–2

2 min
Penalties
4 min
33
Shots
29

==== Elmira at Augsburg ====
March 14, 2026; 4:00 pm	Elmira	3–1 (0–0, 3–1, 0–0)	Augsburg	Ed Saugestad Rink, Minneapolis, Minnesota; Attendance: 350

Olivia Last
Goalies
Marissa Paaske
Referees:
Tom Wasczczak
David Berndgen
Linesmen:
Joe Setrum
Eric Frykman

Toole (Andrews, Dougherty) – 26:24	1–0
	1–1	26:37 – Allen (Grundhoffer)
Comeau (Boyle) – 34:33	2–1
Boyle (Dougherty) – sh – 39:35.1	3–1

6 min
Penalties
2 min
21
Shots
31

==== Endicott at Hamline ====
March 14, 2026; 4:00 pm	Endicott	0–3 (0–0, 0–1, 0–2)	Hamline	TRIA Rink, Saint Paul, Minnesota; Attendance: 257

Lauren Ferrari
Goalies
Kendra Nordick
Referees:
Dan Olson
Kailey Welch
Linesmen:
Jake Caneff
Joe Bennek

0–1	32:04 – Thorson (Sandy, Klemz)
0–2	45:22 – pp – Abrahamson (Chamernick, Ryskamp)
0–3	58:17 – en – Abrahamson

10 min
Penalties
8 min
19
Shots
44

=== Quarterfinals ===
==== Williams at (1) Wisconsin–River Falls ====
March 21, 2026; 4:00 pm	Williams	0–1 (0–0, 0–1, 0–0)	Wisconsin–River Falls	Hunt Arena, River Falls, Wisconsin; Attendance: 1,267

Erin Pye	Goalies	Jordan O'Kane	Referees: Haylee Mello; Dan Olson; Linesmen: Dan Brickman; Jake Caneff
0–1 / 27:16 – Aure (Bell)			Referees: Haylee Mello; Dan Olson; Linesmen: Dan Brickman; Jake Caneff
4 min	Penalties	8 min	Referees: Haylee Mello; Dan Olson; Linesmen: Dan Brickman; Jake Caneff
37	Shots	46	Referees: Haylee Mello; Dan Olson; Linesmen: Dan Brickman; Jake Caneff

==== Elmira at Amherst ====
March 21, 2026; 3:00 pm	Elmira	0–3 (0–0, 0–1, 0–2)	Amherst	Orr Rink, Amherst, Massachusetts; Attendance: 542

Oliva Last
Goalies
Natalie Stott
Referees:
Mark Knapp Jr
Nicole Harris
Linesmen:
Danika Korpacz
Madeline Lane

0–1	32:59 – Reynolds (Dann, Mancini)
0–2	40:41 – pp – Flynn (Dann, Reynolds)
0–3	42:39 – Marleau (Mancini, Reynolds)

8 min
Penalties
4 min
35
Shots
42

==== Hamline at (2) Norwich ====
March 21, 2026; 3:00 pm	Hamline	0–1 (0–1, 0–0, 0–0)	Norwich	Kreitzberg Arena, Northfield, Vermont; Attendance: 1,375

Kendra Nordick	Goalies	Madison Brunet	Referees: Tai Thorsheim; James Troup; Linesmen: Paul Lennon; Jonathan MacDougall
0–1 / 1:00 – Lisac (Brady, Brooks)			Referees: Tai Thorsheim; James Troup; Linesmen: Paul Lennon; Jonathan MacDougall
6 min	Penalties	8 min	Referees: Tai Thorsheim; James Troup; Linesmen: Paul Lennon; Jonathan MacDougall
32	Shots	23	Referees: Tai Thorsheim; James Troup; Linesmen: Paul Lennon; Jonathan MacDougall

==== Wilkes at (3) Nazareth ====
March 21, 2026; 3:00 pm	Wilkes	1–2 OT (0–0, 1–0, 0–1); OT: (0–1)	Nazareth	Rochester Ice Center, Fairport, New York; Attendance: 505

Audrey Milne
Goalies
Mia Gonsalves
Referees:
Thomas Waszczak
Michael Roberts
Linesmen:
Nosike Onyemaobim
Mason Hoeffner

Pacilio (Bell, Ng) – 36:33	1–0
	1–1	46:30 – sh – Boettcher
	1–2	64:33 – Marchese (Skibinski, Mannila)

8 min
Penalties
8 min
31
Shots
37

=== Semifinals ===
==== (3) Nazareth vs. (2) Norwich ====
March 27, 2026; 3:00 pm	Nazareth	5–4 OT (0–3, 2–1, 2–0); OT: (1–0)	Norwich	Hunt Arena, River Falls, Wisconsin; Attendance: 631

Mia Gonsalves
Goalies
Madison Brunet
Referees:
Mark Knapp Jr.
David Berndgen
Linesmen:
Madeline Lane
Danica Korpacz

	0–1	5:35 – Heutmaker (Lisac, Leslie)
	0–2	5:51 – Lane (Linzbichler, Tuzik)
	0–3	14:41 – pp – Cookinham (Leslie, Hunter)
Konrad (Boettcher, Meteyer) – pp – 26:02	1–3
Cedrone (Judkiewicz, Boettcher) – 31:22	2–3
	2–4	31:37 – Boyer (Tuzik, Cookinham)
Laskowski (Zack) – 42:37	3–4
Jacoby (Mannila, Flanagan) – 53:56	4–4
Boettcher (Laskowski) – 60:29	5–4

10 min
Penalties
8 min
31
Shots
30

==== Amherst vs. (1) Wisconsin–River Falls ====
March 27, 2026; 8:00 pm	Amherst	1–3 (0–1, 0–2, 1–0)	Wisconsin–River Falls	Hunt Arena, River Falls, Wisconsin; Attendance: 1,511

Natalie Stott
Goalies
Jordan O'Kane
Referees:
Tom Waszczak
Jim Troup
Linesmen:
Joe Setrum
Joe Bennek

	0–1	10:12 – pp – A. Niccum (Goodreau, Hess)
	0–2	22:24 – pp – Goodreau (Hess, Aure)
	0–3	32:32 – Kadrlik (K. Niccum, Seleski)
Reynolds (Marleau, Flynn) – pp – 56:54	1–3

6 min
Penalties
4 min
31
Shots
33

=== Championship ===
==== (3) Nazareth vs. (1) Wisconsin–River Falls ====
March 29, 2026; 3:00 pm	Nazareth	0–4 (0–0, 0–2, 0–2)	Wisconsin–River Falls	Hunt Arena, River Falls, Wisconsin; Attendance: 1,689

Mia Gonsalves
Goalies
Jordan O'Kane
Referees:
James Troup
Tom Waszczak
Linesmen:
Danika Korpacz
Madeline Lane

0–1	21:01 – pp – Riley (Aure, Goodreau)
0–2	23:26 – Hess (Lindquist, Aure)
0–3	50:19 – Kadrlik (Pool, K. Niccum)
0–4	57:44 – en – Hess

8 min
Penalties
6 min
22
Shots
44

Note: all times eastern
