= 2012 NCAA Division III women's ice hockey tournament =

2012 NCAA Division III Women's ice hockey tournament
- Teams: 8
- Finals site: Frank Ritter Memorial Ice Arena, Henrietta, New York
- Champions: RIT Tigers (1st title)
- Runner-up: Norwich Cadets (3rd title game)
- Semifinalists: Plattsburgh Cardinals (6th Frozen Four); Gustavus Adolphus Golden Gusties (6th Frozen Four)
- Winning coach: Scott McDonald (1 title)
- MOP: Laura Chamberlain (RIT)
- Attendance: 1195

The 2012 NCAA Women's Division III Ice Hockey Tournament involved eight schools in single-elimination play, that determined the national champion of women's NCAA Division III college ice hockey. The Frozen Four will be contested in the arenas of the teams with the better record.

== Background ==
The automatic qualifiers for the tournament include the postseason tournament champions from the following conferences: ECAC East, ECAC West, MIAC, NCHA and NESCAC. The Division III committee consists of the following members: Renee Hellert, New England College athletic director; Michael Letzeisen, ECAC administrator; Brad Marshall, head coach at St. Catherine; Jodi McKenna, head coach at Wesleyan; Steve Nelson, Wisconsin-Superior athletic director.

== Qualifying teams ==
2012 Qualifying Teams
ECAC East, NCHA, MIAC, NESCAC, SUNYAC, ECAC West

School	Conference	Appearance	Last bid
Amherst	NESCAC	5th	2010
Concordia	MIAC	1st	Never
Gustavus Adolphus	MIAC	10th	2011
Middlebury	NESCAC	10th	2011
Norwich	ECAC East	4th	2011
Plattsburgh State	SUNYAC	8th	2010
RIT	ECAC West	3rd	2011
Wisconsin-River Falls	NCHA	5th	2011

== Bracket ==
National Quarterfinals; March 10
Concordia	2
RIT	5
Plattsburgh State	4
Middlebury	2
Gustavus Adolphus	4
Wisconsin–River Falls	2
Norwich	5
Amherst	0

National Semifinals; March 16
RIT	2
Plattsburgh State	1
Gustavus Adolphus	3
Norwich	4

National Championship; March 17
RIT	4
Norwich	1
Third place
Plattsburgh State	4
Gustavus Adolphus	3

Note: * denotes overtime period(s)

== Results ==
=== Quarterfinals ===
==== Concordia at RIT ====
March 10, 2012; 2:00 pm	Concordia	2–5 (2–1, 0–1, 0–3)	RIT	Frank Ritter Memorial Ice Arena, Henrietta, New York; Attendance: 517

Rebecca Hendrickson
Goalies
Laura Chamberlain
Referees:
Marc Remillard
Will O'Malley
Linesmen:
David Panek
Mark Bestram

	0–1	1:27 – Maugeri (Bulleid)
Julius (Leland) – 12:21	1–1
Vandegrift (Julius, Nelson) – pp – 13:39	2–1
	2–2	22:01 – McCrea (Hiller)
	2–3	44:31 – pp – McCrea (Kunichika, Schlattman)
	2–4	51:23 – Hiller (McCrea, Grigg)
	2–5	53:44 – McCrea (Scoyne, Hiller)

12 min
Penalties
6 min
13
Shots
35

==== Plattsburgh State at Middlebury ====
March 10, 2012; 7:00 pm	Plattsburgh State	4–2 (1–2, 0–0, 3–0)	Middlebury	Kenyon Arena, Middlebury, Vermont; Attendance: 525

Sydney Aveson
Goalies
Annabelle Jones
Referees:
Scott Prim
John Kaselouskas
Linesmen:
Patrick Callan
Sean McGlynn

	0–1	12:00 – pp – Ugalde (Melberg)
	0–2	12:42 – pp – Bielawski (Styrbicki, Krakower)
Parke (Caldwell) – 13:56	1–2
Gove (Kistner, Shaubel) – pp – 51:54	2–2
Gove (Kistner, Shaubel) – pp – 53:43	3–2
Klassen – en – 59:19	4–2

10 min
Penalties
19 min
26
Shots
24

== See also ==
- 2012 NCAA Division I Women's Ice Hockey Tournament
- 2012 NCAA Division I Men's Ice Hockey Tournament
- 2012 CIS Women's Ice Hockey Tournament
