= RIT Tigers =

Intercollegiate athletics teams of Rochester Institute of Technology

- University: Rochester Institute of Technology
- Nickname: Tigers
- NCAA: Division III; Division I (ice hockey only)
- Conference: Liberty League; Atlantic Hockey America (men's and women's ice hockey)
- Athletic director: Jacqueline Nicholson
- Location: Henrietta, New York
- Varsity teams: 22
- Basketball arena: Clark Gymnasium
- Ice hockey arena: Gene Polisseni Center
- Soccer stadium: Tiger Stadium
- Aquatics center: Judson Pool
- Lacrosse stadium: Tiger Stadium
- Rowing venue: Gosnell Boathouse
- Other venues: Frank Ritter Memorial Ice Arena
- Colors: Orange, white, and black
- Mascot: RITchie
- Website: ritathletics.com

The RIT Tigers are composed of 22 teams representing the Rochester Institute of Technology in intercollegiate athletics, including men's and women's basketball, crew, cross country, cheerleading, ice hockey, lacrosse, soccer, swimming & diving, tennis, and track and field. Men's sports include baseball and wrestling. Women's sports include softball, and volleyball. The Tigers compete in the NCAA Division III and are members of the Liberty League for all sports except ice hockey, which competes in NCAA Division I. The men's and women's ice hockey teams are members of Atlantic Hockey America, formed by the 2024 merger of the Tigers' former hockey homes of the men-only Atlantic Hockey Association and the women-only College Hockey America.

== Teams ==
| Men's sports | Women's sports |
|---|---|
| Baseball | Basketball |
| Basketball | Rowing |
| Rowing | Cross country |
| Cross country | Ice hockey |
| Ice hockey | Lacrosse |
| Lacrosse | Soccer |
| Soccer | Softball |
| Swimming & diving | Swimming & diving |
| Tennis | Tennis |
| Track & field^{1} | Track & field^{1} |
| Wrestling | Volleyball |
^{1} – includes both indoor and outdoor.

=== Men's basketball ===
Men's basketball at RIT started with the 1915–16 season. In the 1955–56 season under coach A. Leo Fox, they went undefeated with 17 wins and 0 losses, success that led local media to dub the team "Tigers". (The college then adopted the nickname for all athletic teams, replacing "Techmen".)

They participated in the NCAA Division III men's basketball tournament in 1976, 1995, 1996, 1997, 1999, 2000, and 2009.

The Tigers were coached by Bob McVean for 40 seasons from 1983 to 2024. For three seasons in a row from 1994 to 1997, McVean earned EAA Coach of the Year honors as the Tigers finished with 20 or more wins and qualified for the NCAA tournament each year.

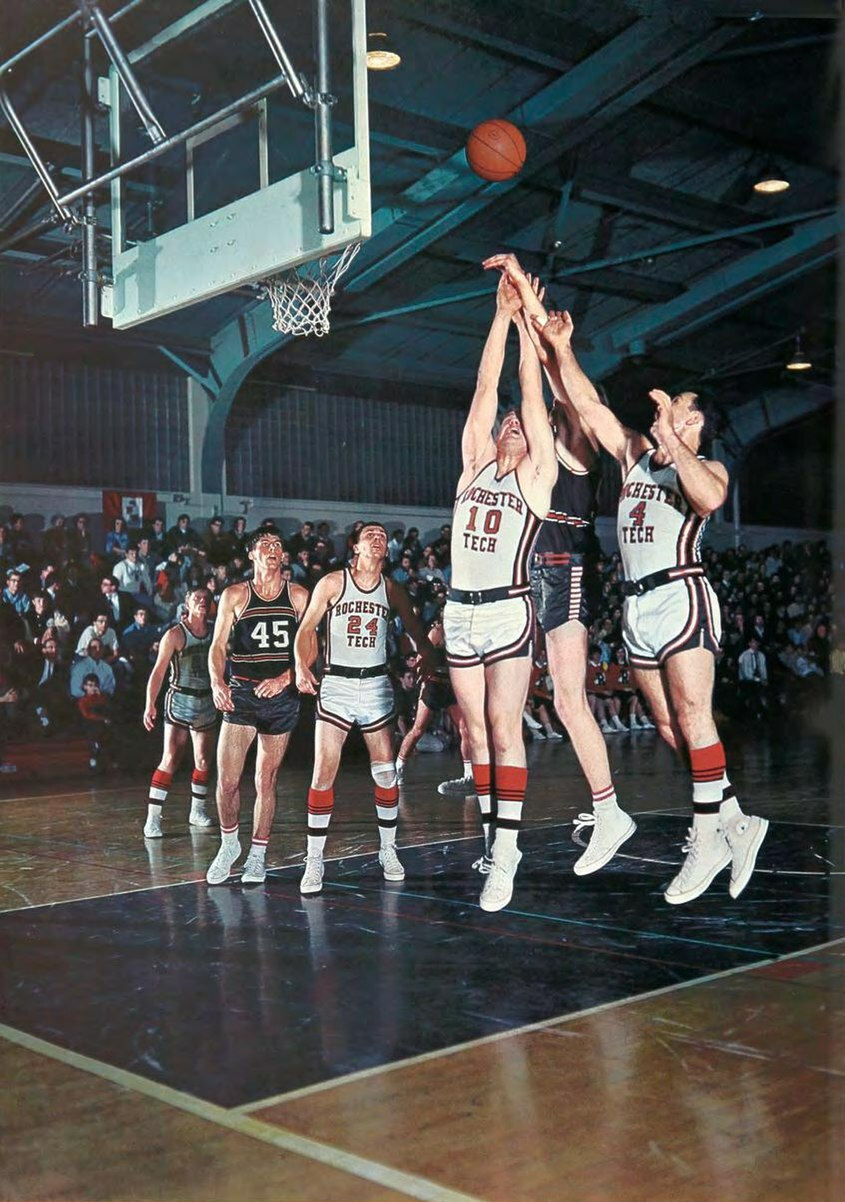
Tigers men's basketball in action, 1967–68 season

Coaching history as of 2026
| Coach | Dates | Wins | Losses | Win % |
|---|---|---|---|---|
| (No coach) | 1915–1916 | 9 | 12 | 0.429 |
| V. Croop | 1916–1918 | 11 | 6 | 0.647 |
| (No record) | 1918–1919 | – | – | – |
| Harold Brodie | 1919–1920 | 10 | 8 | 0.556 |
| Arthur McCrain | 1920–1921 | 4 | 11 | 0.267 |
| Peasley | 1921–1922 | – | – | – |
| Robert McKay (Note: Robert McKay had two non-continuous terms as coach. His overall win-loss record is 75–84 (0.472).) | 1922–1923 | 4 | 8 | 0.333 |
| Bill Thompson | 1923–1924 | 5 | 13 | 0.278 |
| Carl Beghold | 1924–1925 | 1 | 13 | 0.071 |
| Robert McKay | 1925–1934 | 71 | 76 | 0.483 |
| Perk Cohen | 1934–1937 | 18 | 21 | 0.462 |
| John Elberfeld | 1937–1940 | 14 | 28 | 0.333 |
| A. Leo Fox (Note: No team from 1942 to 1946 due to World War II) | 1940–1956 | 115 | 79 | 0.593 |
| Lou Alexander | 1956–1968 | 120 | 146 | 0.451 |
| Bill Carey | 1968–1980 | 162 | 124 | 0.566 |
| Bill Nelson | 1980–1983 | 40 | 36 | 0.526 |
| Bob McVean | 1983–2024 | 556 | 490 | 0.531 |
| Dominic Parker | 2024–present | 14 | 36 | 0.280 |
| Total | | 1,083 | 1,107 | 0.495 |

=== Women's basketball ===
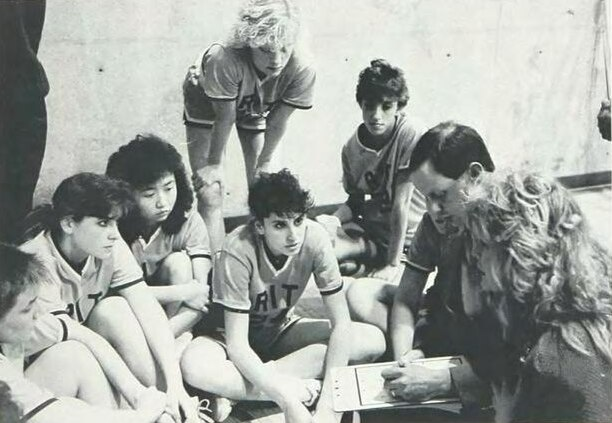
Women's basketball players with coach Mark Storm in the team's inaugural season (1988)

Women's basketball began at RIT with their first varsity match on January 6, 1988, when they lost to the Brockport Golden Eagles 73–39. Their first postseason appearance took place in the 2007 Empire 8 tournament. They appeared in the NCAA Division III tournament in 2017, 2018, and 2019.

Coaching history as of 2022
| Coach | Dates | Wins | Losses | Win % |
|---|---|---|---|---|
| Mark Storm | 1987–1989 | 8 | 31 | 0.205 |
| Nelson Miles | 1989–1995 | 16 | 124 | 0.114 |
| Julie Diehl | 1995–1996 | 7 | 17 | 0.292 |
| Laura Hungerford | 1996–2001 | 21 | 101 | 0.172 |
| Jeff McCaffery | 2001–2002 | 1 | 23 | 0.042 |
| Debbie Buff | 2002–2008 | 51 | 83 | 0.381 |
| Rob Peterson | 2007–2008 | 7 | 10 | 0.412 |
| Amy Reed | 2008–present | 175 | 164 | 0.516 |
| Total | | 286 | 553 | 0.341 |

=== Football ===
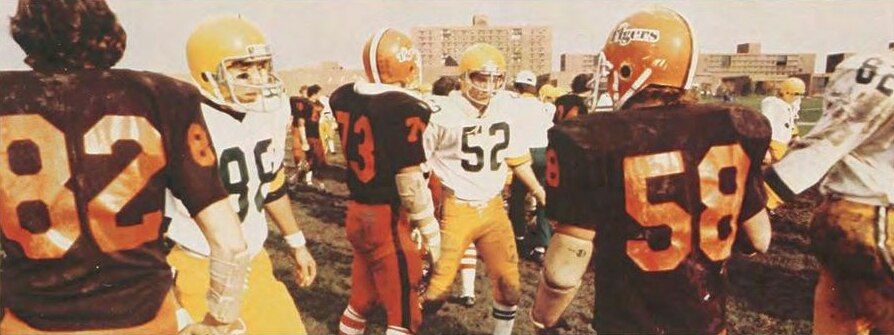
RIT's football team in 1977, their final season

RIT had an early football team that ceased playing circa 1922. In 1968, a club football team was formed, and in 1971, football became a university-sanctioned sport as the team joined NCAA Division II. They moved to NCAA Division III in 1973. In January 1978, after seven seasons, RIT discontinued its football program on the basis that they would not be able to commit sufficient funding to the team.

Coaching history
| Coach | Dates | Wins | Losses | Ties | Win % |
|---|---|---|---|---|---|
| Tom Coughlin | 1971–1973 | 12 | 12 | 2 | 0.500 |
| Lou Spiotti | 1974–1977 | 6 | 20 | 0 | 0.231 |
| Total | | 18 | 32 | 2 | 0.365 |

=== Men's ice hockey ===
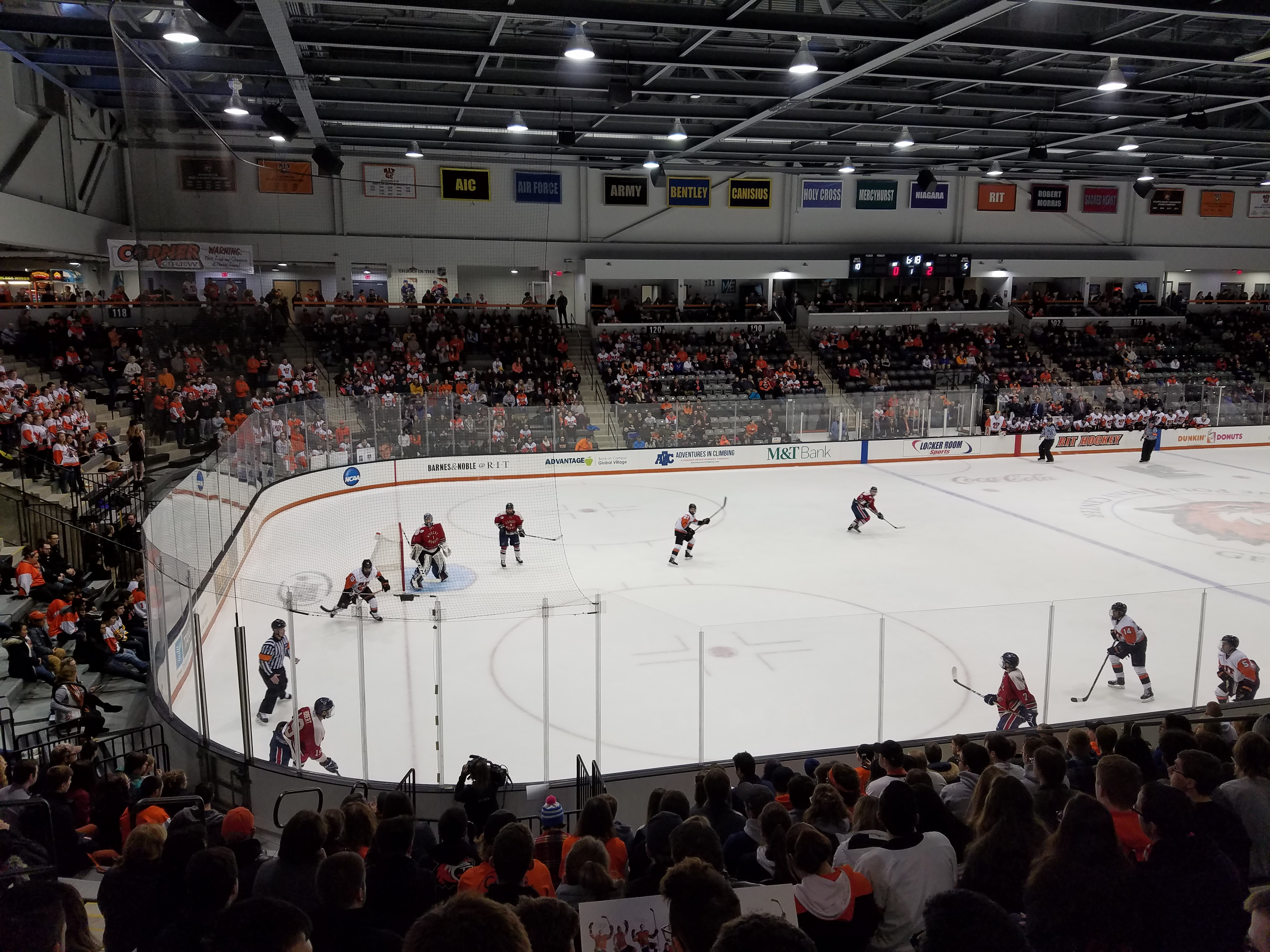
A men's ice hockey home game in 2019

The men's ice hockey at RIT dates back to an amateur team founded by an RIT student in 1957. Men's ice hockey became a varsity sport at RIT when they debuted in NCAA Division II in the 1962–63 season. They won the 1983 NCAA Division II tournament and the 1985 NCAA Division III tournament. They moved up to NCAA Division I for the 2005–06 season.

=== Women's ice hockey ===
The RIT women's hockey team began with the 1975–76 season. They won the 2012 NCAA Division III tournament before moving up to NCAA Division I the following season. They now compete in College Hockey America, part of NCAA Division I.

=== Men's lacrosse ===
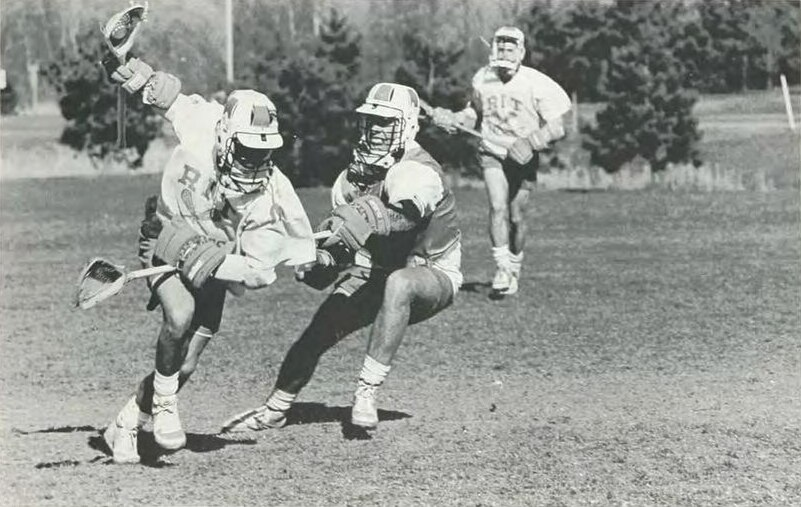
Tigers men's lacrosse in action in 1987

The RIT Tigers men's lacrosse team dates back to 1964, when a lacrosse club was organized on campus. The club played their first season in the spring of 1966. In 1968, men's lacrosse became a university-sanctioned sport and the Tigers played their first season in NCAA Division II. They moved down to Division III beginning with the 1974 season.

In 2021, the RIT Tigers won the 2021 NCAA Division III tournament, defeating the Salisbury Sea Gulls in the championship game to cap off an undefeated season. The team would repeat as national champions in 2022 when they defeated Union College, 12–10.

Coaching history as of 2022
| Coach | Dates | Wins | Losses | Win % |
|---|---|---|---|---|
| Ralph Armstrong | 1968–1970 | 19 | 10 | 0.655 |
| Bruce Babcock | 1971 | 5 | 6 | 0.454 |
| Bruce Opalka | 1972 | 0 | 13 | 0.000 |
| George McGraw | 1973 | 2 | 12 | 0.142 |
| A. J. Russo | 1974–1975 | 14 | 12 | 0.538 |
| Fred Recchio | 1976–1978 | 19 | 19 | 0.500 |
| Ray Rostan | 1979–1981 | 25 | 15 | 0.625 |
| Bill Tierney | 1982–1984 | 34 | 7 | 0.829 |
| Bill Glennon | 1985–1988 | 48 | 14 | 0.436 |
| Guy Van Arsdale | 1989–2000 | 112 | 54 | 0.674 |
| Andy Cooney | 2001 | 7 | 7 | 0.500 |
| Gene Peluso | 2002–2009 | 88 | 45 | 0.661 |
| Jake Coon | 2010–present | 228 | 24 | 0.905 |
| Total | | 601 | 238 | 0.716 |

=== Men's soccer ===
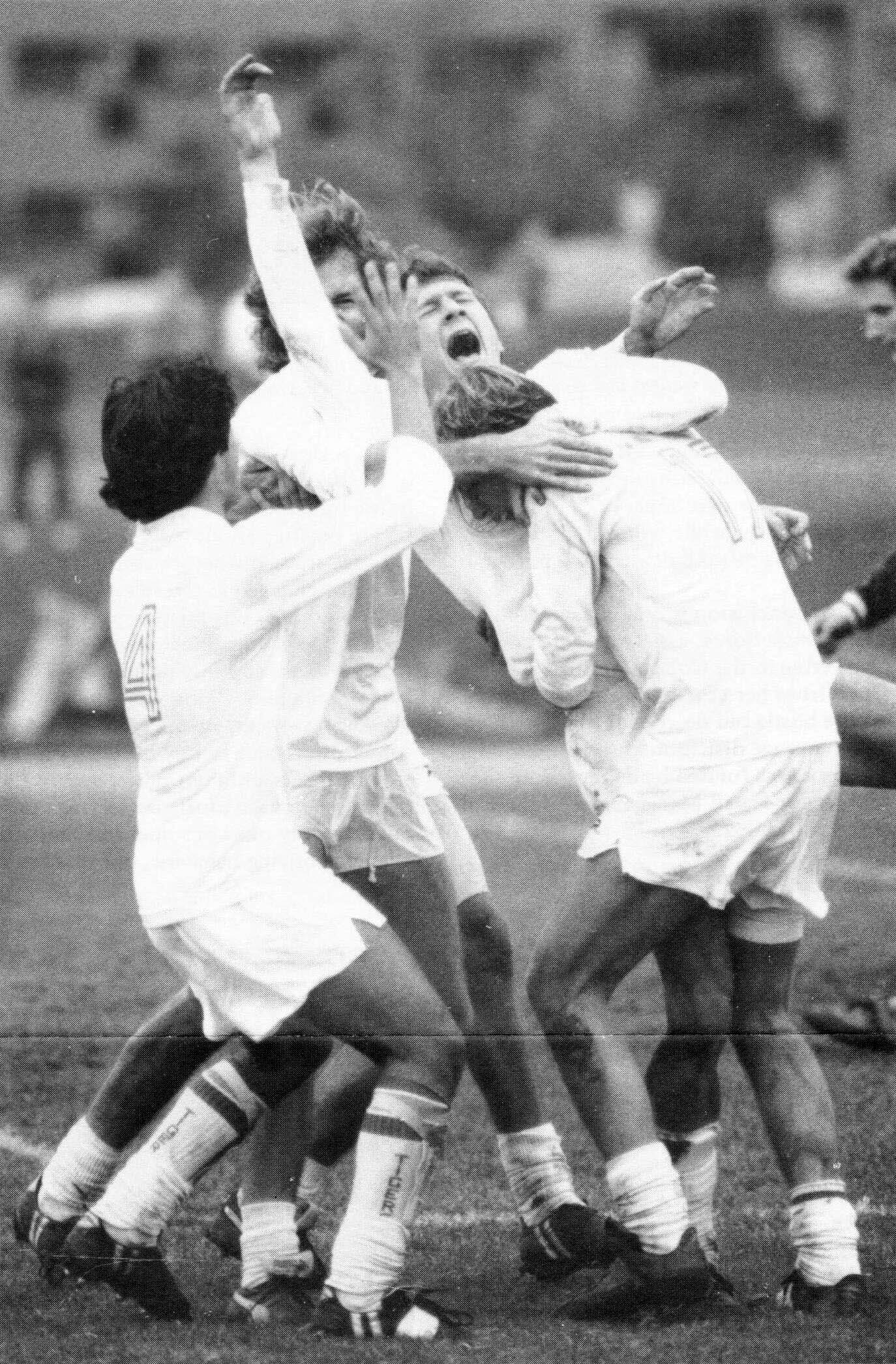
RIT men's soccer players celebrating a goal during their 1984 run to the NCAA tournament semifinals

RIT's men's soccer team records go back to 1960. They play in NCAA Division III. As of 2021, their best performance in the NCAA Division III men's soccer tournament came in 1988, when they lost 3–0 in the final game to the UC San Diego Tritons.

Coaching history as of 2022
| Coach | Dates | Wins | Losses | Ties | Win % |
|---|---|---|---|---|---|
| Jim Dickie | 1960–1971 | 69 | 69 | 12 | 0.500 |
| Bill Nelson | 1972–1979 | 38 | 67 | 16 | 0.380 |
| Doug May | 1980–1995 | 196 | 56 | 24 | 0.753 |
| Bill Garno | 1996–present | 204 | 186 | 48 | 0.520 |
| Total | | 507 | 378 | 100 | 0.573 |

=== Women's soccer ===
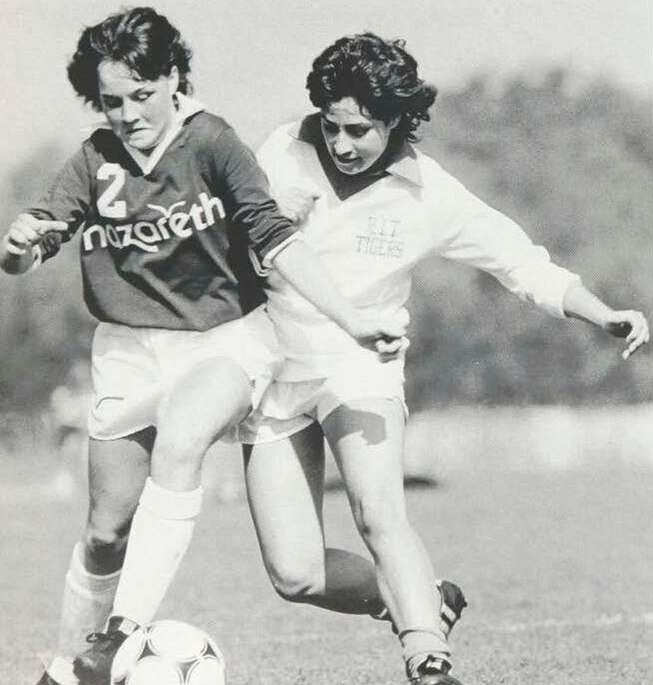
RIT women's soccer in action in 1985

RIT's women's soccer team dates back to 1982. They play in NCAA Division III.

Coaching history as of 2022
| Coach | Dates | Wins | Losses | Ties | Win % |
|---|---|---|---|---|---|
| Paul Caraci | 1982–1987 | 39 | 52 | 7 | 0.433 |
| Jon Poulakis | 1988–1991 | 33 | 33 | 3 | 0.500 |
| Abby Steele | 1992–1995 | 21 | 34 | 6 | 0.393 |
| Tom Natalie | 1996–2009 | 106 | 115 | 19 | 0.481 |
| Liz Masterson | 2010–present | 110 | 63 | 30 | 0.615 |
| Total | | 309 | 297 | 65 | 0.510 |

=== Wrestling ===
Wrestling at RIT has had a storied history, beginning with the 1927-28 season. RIT has had four total individual NCAA Division III champions, with five titles total. In 2026, Josh Harkless became the Tigers' most recent national champion, winning the 285 lb. title. RIT's best overall team place finish in the NCAA Division III Championships was in 2022, where the team placed seventh.

== History ==
RIT was a long-time member of the Empire 8, an NCAA Division III athletic conference, but moved to the Liberty League beginning with the 2011–12 academic year. All of RIT's teams compete at the Division III level, with the exception of the men's and women's ice hockey programs, which play at the Division I level. In 2010, the men's ice hockey team was the first ever from the Atlantic Hockey conference to reach the NCAA tournament semi-finals: The Frozen Four.

On March 17, 2012, the women's ice hockey team, after finishing the regular season with a record of 28–1–1, won its first NCAA Division III national championship, defeating the defending champion Norwich University 4–1. The women's team had carried a record of 54–3–3 over their past 2 regular seasons leading up to that point. Three days later, RIT successfully applied for the women's hockey team to move from Division III to Division I. Starting in the 2012–13 season, the women's team joined the College Hockey America conference, and was eligible for conference postseason play, but not NCAA postseason play. The moratorium on the NCAA postseason was lifted 2 years later beginning with the 2014–15 season.

Additionally, RIT has a wide variety of club, intramural, and pick-up sports and teams to provide a less-competitive recreational option to students.

Tom Coughlin, coach of the NFL's 2008 and 2012 Super Bowl champion New York Giants, taught physical education and coached the RIT Men's Varsity Football team in the 1970s.

Since 1968 the school's hockey teams played at Frank Ritter Memorial Ice Arena on campus, but in 2010, the school launched the "Power Play" campaign, in which it hoped to raise 15 of the 30 million dollars it would cost to build a new arena. On November 11, 2011 it was announced that B. Thomas Golisano and the Polisseni Foundation were donating 4.5 million to the new arena, which came to be named the Gene Polisseni Center. The new 4,300 seat arena was completed in 2014 and the Men's and Women's teams moved into the new facility in September for the 2014–15 season.

=== Championships ===
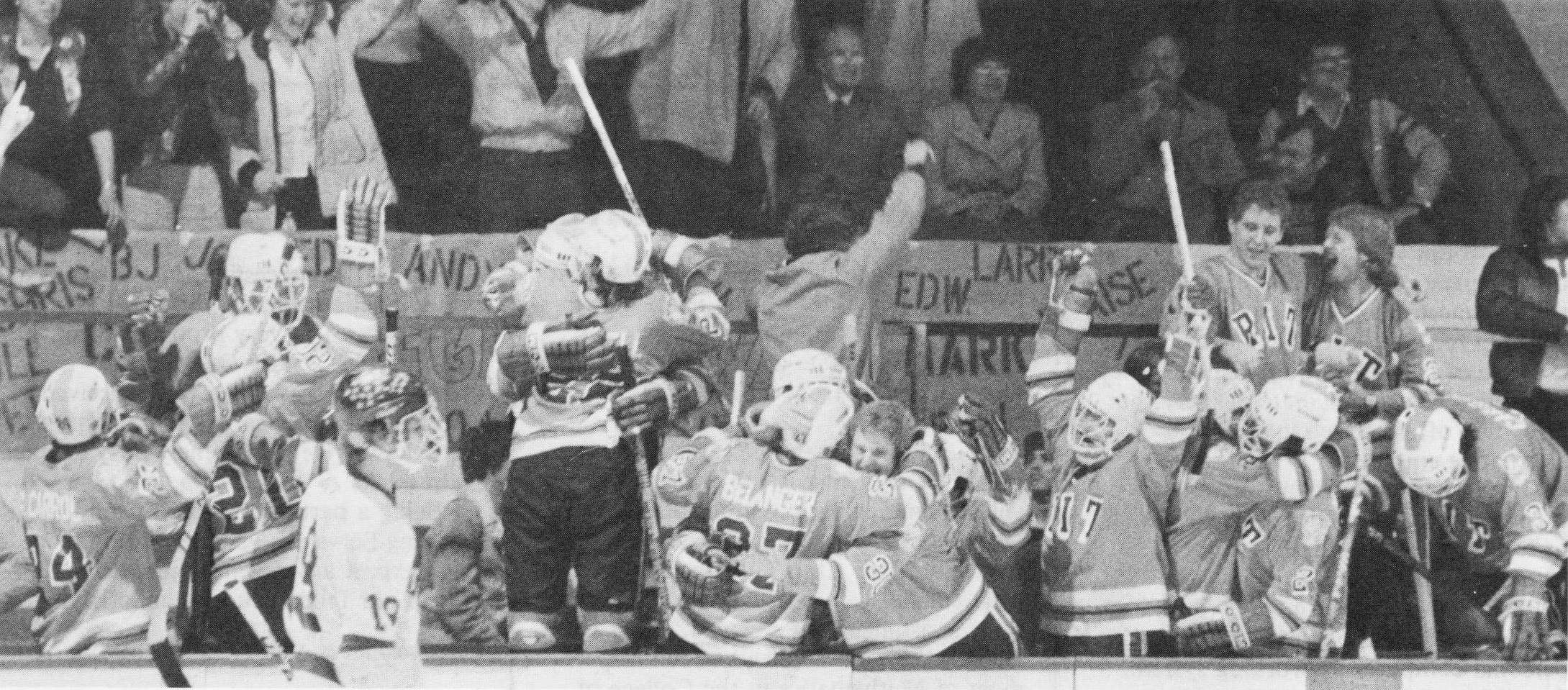
The men's ice hockey team bench explodes in celebration in the final seconds of the 1983 championship game

NCAA team national championships
| Year | Sport | Division |
|---|---|---|
| 1983 | Men's hockey | II |
| 1985 | Men's hockey | III |
| 2012 | Women's hockey | III |
| 2021 | Men's lacrosse | III |
| 2022 | Men's lacrosse | III |

NCAA individual national championships
| Year | Sport | Athlete | Division |
|---|---|---|---|
| 1976 | Men's Outdoor Track and Field | Mark Stebbins, 400-meter intermediate hurdles | III |
| 1978 | Men's Outdoor Track and Field | Mark Stebbins, 400-meter intermediate hurdles | III |
| 1982 | Swimming and Diving | Barry Zacharias, 400-yard individual medley | III |
| 1983 | Wrestling | Darryl Leslie, 142-Pound Weight Class | III |
| 1986 | Women's Outdoor Track and Field | Michele Jones, 100-meter dash | III |
| 1997 | Wrestling | Matt Hamill, 167-Pound Weight Class | III |
| 1998 | Wrestling | Matt Hamill, 190-Pound Weight Class | III |
| 1999 | Wrestling | Matt Hamill, 197-Pound Weight Class | III |
| 2026 | Wrestling | Josh Harkness, 285-Pound Weight Class | III |

== Mascot ==
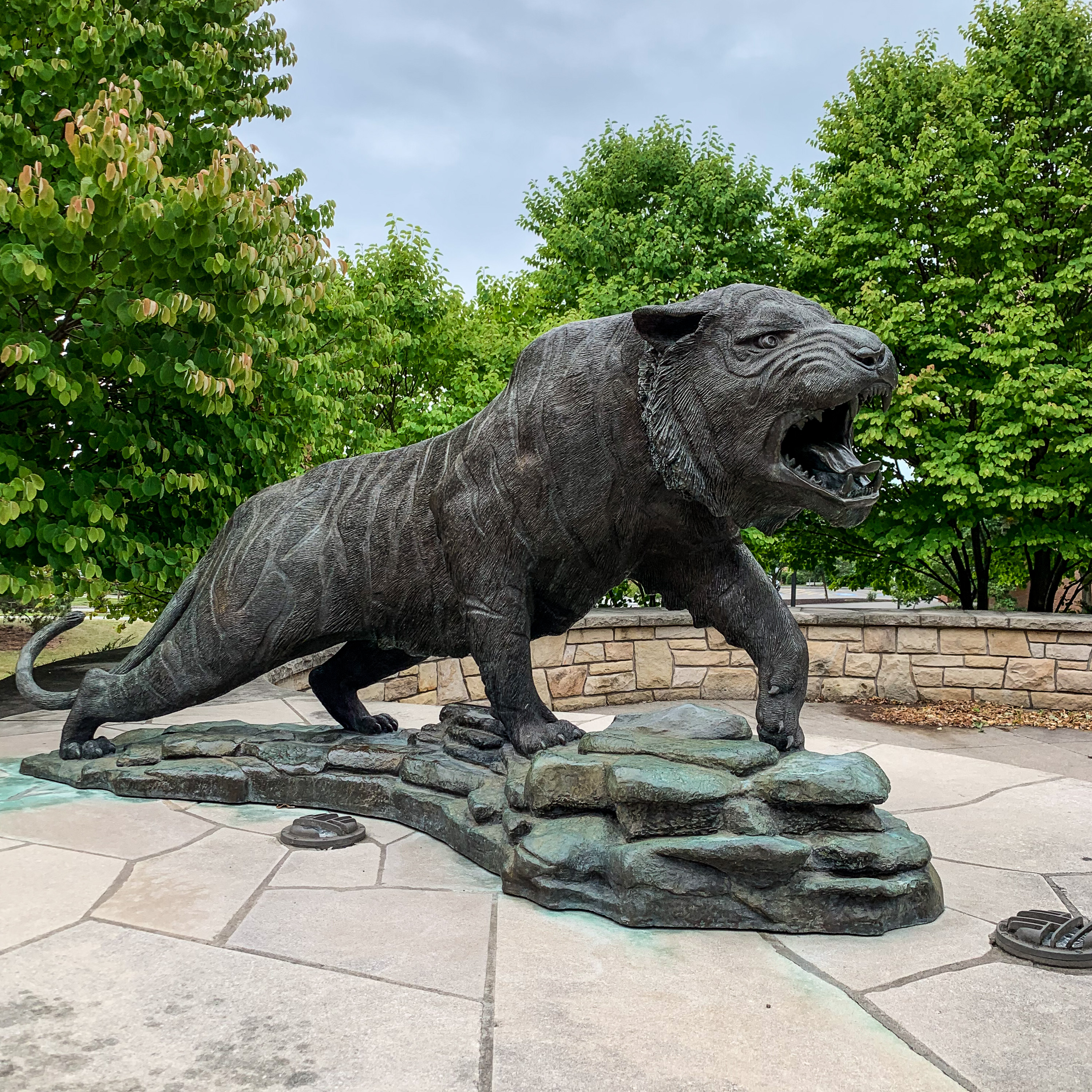
Statue representing SpiRIT on the Quarter Mile (dedicated 1989)

RIT's athletics nickname is the "Tigers", a name given following the undefeated men's basketball season of 1955–56. Prior to that, RIT's athletic teams were called the "Techmen" and had blue and silver as the sports colors. In 1963, RIT purchased a rescued Bengal tiger which became the Institute's mascot, named SPIRIT. He was taken to sports events until late spring, when he was moved to the Seneca Park Zoo. A year and a half later, when X-rays revealed he was suffering from genetic pelvic and leg joint problems, he was humanely euthanized. The original tiger's pelt now resides in the school's archives at the on-campus library. RIT helped the Seneca Park Zoo purchase a new tiger shortly after SPIRIT's death, but it was not used as a school mascot. A metal sculpture in the center of the Henrietta campus now provides an everlasting version of the mascot.

RIT's team mascot is a version of this Bengal Tiger named RITchie. RITchie was the selected name entered in 1989 by alumnus Richard P. Mislan during a College Activities Board "Name the RIT Tiger" contest. After it was announced that the RIT men's hockey team was moving from Division III to Division I in 2005, RITchie was redesigned and made his debut in the fall of 2006.
