= 2025 NCAA Division III women's ice hockey tournament =

2025 NCAA Division III Women's ice hockey tournament
- Teams: 12
- Finals site: Hunt Arena, River Falls, Wisconsin
- Champions: Wisconsin–River Falls Falcons (2nd title)
- Runner-up: Amherst Mammoths (4th title game)
- Semifinalists: Middlebury Panthers (11th Frozen Four); Augsburg Auggies (1st Frozen Four)
- Winning coach: Joe Cranston (2nd title)
- MOP: Bailey Olson (Wisconsin–River Falls)

The 2025 NCAA Division III women's ice hockey tournament was a single-elimination tournament with twelve schools to determine the national champion of women's NCAA Division III college ice hockey. The first round was played on the campuses of the higher on March 15, 2025, and quarterfinals were played on the campuses of the top four seeded teams on March 22, 2025. The Frozen Four was played on March 28 and 30, 2025 at Hunt Arena in River Falls, Wisconsin. The Wisconsin–River Falls Falcons defeated the Amherst Mammoths 3–1 to win their second consecutive title.

== Qualifying teams ==
2025 Qualifying Teams
MIAC, WIAC, NEHC, NESCAC, CNE, SUNYAC, UCHC, NCHA, MAC,

The eight winners of their conference tournaments will receive automatic berths to the tournament. The other four teams will be selected at-large. The top four teams are seeded.

Seed	School	Conference	Record	Berth type	Appearance	Last bid
1	Augsburg	MIAC	23–3–1	Tournament champion	1st	Never
2	Amherst	NESCAC	21–5–1	Tournament champion	10th	2024
3	Middlebury	NESCAC	20–6–1	At-large bid	19th	2024
4	Wisconsin–River Falls	WIAC	23–3–2	At-large bid	16th	2024
	Colby	NESCAC	17–6–2	At-large bid	3rd	2023
	Elmira	NEHC	20–7–1	Tournament champion	19th	2024
	Endicott	CNE	18–5–3	Tournament champion	4th	2022
	Gustavus Adolphus	MIAC	23–3–1	At-large bid	18th	2024
	Nazareth	UCHC	20–6–1	Tournament champion	4th	2024
	Plattsburgh State	SUNYAC	20–6–1	Tournament champion	20th	2024
	St. Norbert	NCHA	24–4–1	Tournament champion	2nd	2013
	Wilkes	MAC	22–4–1	Tournament champion	1st	Never

=== Bids by state ===
Bids	State	School(s)
3	New York	Elmira, Nazareth, Plattsburgh State
2	Massachusetts	Amherst, Endicott
2	Minnesota	Augsburg, Gustavus Adolphus
2	Wisconsin	St. Norbert, Wisconsin–River Falls
1	Maine	Colby
1	Pennsylvania	Wilkes
1	Vermont	Middlebury

== Bracket ==
First round March 15
St. Norbert	3
Gustavus Adolphus	1
Elmira	1
Plattsburgh State	0
Nazareth	4
Endicott	2
Wilkes	3
Colby	4

Quarterfinals; March 22
St. Norbert	2
1	Augsburg	4
Elmira	1
4	Wisconsin-River Falls	4
Nazareth	0
3	Middlebury	1
Colby	1
2	Amherst	4

Semifinals; March 28
1	Augsburg	2
4	Wisconsin-River Falls	4
3	Middlebury	1
2	Amherst	3

National Championship; March 30
4	Wisconsin-River Falls	3
2	Amherst	1

== Results ==
=== First Round ===
==== St. Norbert v. Gustavus Adolphus ====
March 15, 2025; 3:00 pm	St. Norbert	3–1 (1–1, 1–0, 1–0)	Gustavus Adolphus	Lund Arena, St. Peter, Minnesota; Attendance: 547

Keira Markell
Goalies
Lily Timmons
Referees:
Dan Olson
Eric Olson
Linesmen:
Joe Stretrum
Eric Frykman

	0–1	02:18 – Mortenson (Thompson, Elliott)
Federici (C. Hogan, Zurawik) – pp – 12:22	1–1
Ross (Zurawik) – 34:22	2–1
Stebbeds (Charchenko, Healy) – 43:24	3–1

4 min
Penalties
2 min
13
Shots
46

==== Elmira v. Plattsburgh State ====
March 15, 2025; 3:00 pm	Elmira	1–0 (1–0, 0–0, 0–0)	Plattsburgh State	Ronald B. Stafford Ice Arena, Plattsburgh, New York; Attendance: 778

Sára Ševčíková	Goalies	Chloe Lewis	Referees: Ryan St. Louis; James Visconte; Linesmen: Jason Therrien; Jason Lamoy
Goleniak (Schmidt, Dougherty) – pp – 13:57 / 1–0			Referees: Ryan St. Louis; James Visconte; Linesmen: Jason Therrien; Jason Lamoy
10 min	Penalties	4 min	Referees: Ryan St. Louis; James Visconte; Linesmen: Jason Therrien; Jason Lamoy
17	Shots	40	Referees: Ryan St. Louis; James Visconte; Linesmen: Jason Therrien; Jason Lamoy

==== Nazareth v. Endicott ====
March 15, 2025; 3:00 pm	Nazareth	4–2 (1–1, 1–1, 2–0)	Endicott	Raymond J. Bourque Arena, Beverly, Massachusetts; Attendance: 428

McKinley Hoff
Goalies
Lauren Ferrari
Referees:
Heidi Niskanen
Haylee Mello
Linesmen:
Madeline Lane
Mikala Walsh

	0–1	4:45 – Kurrle (Rago, Corso)
Kindred (Lyden, Judkiewicz) – 13:41	1–1
	1–2	25:10 – Seibold (Henshaw, Anderson)
Pittis (Laskowski, Sharp) – 36:11	2–2
Laskowski (Holmes, Judkiewicz) – pp – 53:36	3–2
Laskowski (Lyden, Quackenbush) – en – 58:43	4–2

0 min
Penalties
2 min
30
Shots
24

==== Wilkes v. Colby ====
March 15, 2025; 3:00 pm	Wilkes	3–4 (1–2, 0–2, 2–0)	Colby	Alfond Rink, Waterville, Maine; Attendance: 750

Audrey Milne
Goalies
Mandy Busky

	0–1	01:17 – Shirer (Tattersall, Staton)
Bell (Maxon) – 10:44	1–1
	1–2	15:41 – Studley (Wick)
	1–3	22:26 – Martodam (Lefebvre, Tattersall)
	1–4	24:42 – Lefebvre
Bouchard (Pacilio) – 40:21	2–4
Hudáková (Ferry, Bouchard) – pp, ea – 59:11	3–4

6 min
Penalties
8 min
29
Shots
28

=== Quarterfinals ===
==== Nazareth v. (3) Middlebury ====
March 22, 2025; 3:00 pm	Nazareth	0–1 (0–0, 0–1, 0–0)	Middlebury	Chip Kenyon '85 Arena, Middlebury, Vermont; Attendance: 2,400

McKinley Hoff	Goalies	Sophia Will	Referees: Courtney Drennan; Steven Urbanke; Linesmen: Aaron Jones; Mike Verminski
0–1 / 32:20 – Flynn (Hower, Kim)			Referees: Courtney Drennan; Steven Urbanke; Linesmen: Aaron Jones; Mike Verminski
0 min	Penalties	2 min	Referees: Courtney Drennan; Steven Urbanke; Linesmen: Aaron Jones; Mike Verminski
23	Shots	31	Referees: Courtney Drennan; Steven Urbanke; Linesmen: Aaron Jones; Mike Verminski

==== Colby v. (2) Amherst ====
March 22, 2025; 3:00 pm	Colby	1–4 (0–2, 0–1, 1–1)	Amherst	Orr Rink, Amherst, Massachusetts; Attendance: 370

Mandy Busky
Goalies
Natalie Stott
Referees:
Chris Parsons
Michael Snyder
Linesmen:
Kyle Frenette
Madeline Lane

	0–1	02:44 – Flynn
	0–2	14:21 – pp – Abban (Reynolds, Raffin)
	0–3	26:15 – Flynn (Abban, Hohmann)
	0–4	41:46 – Fu (Dann, Lester)
Jiang – 44:57	1–4

2 min
Penalties
4 min
30
Shots
31

==== Elmira v. (4) Wisconsin–River Falls ====
March 22, 2025; 3:00 pm	Elmira	1–4 (0–1, 0–1, 1–2)	Wisconsin–River Falls	Hunt Arena, River Falls, Wisconsin; Attendance: 1,029

Sára Ševčíková
Goalies
Jordan O'Kane
Referees:
David Berndgen
Mike Roberts
Linesmen:
Eric Frykman
Daniel Brickman

	0–1	17:56 – Carothers (Kadrlik, Olson)
	0–2	30:45 – Olson
	0–3	45:48 – pp – Brice (Goodreau, Jones)
Goleniak (Lugge) – 49:02	1–3
	1–4	57:48 – pp – Goodreau (Aure, Lindquist)

8 min
Penalties
4 min
19
Shots
43

==== St. Norbert v. (1) Augsburg ====
March 22, 2025; 3:00 pm	St. Norbert	2–4 (0–0, 1–4, 1–0)	Augsburg	Augsburg Ice Arena, Minneapolis, Minnesota; Attendance: 800

Kiera Markell
Goalies
Kayla Simonson
Referees:
Michaela Ball
Ross Van Zeeland
Linesmen:
Jase Friedlieb
Michael Hughes

	0–1	21:29 – Abrahamson (Fagerlind)
	0–2	22:48 – pp – Abrahamson (Schulte, Cronkhite)
Wicklund (C. Hogan, N. Hogan) – 32:37	1–2
	1–3	33:02 – Schulte (Cronkhite, Stepan)
	1–4	34:42 – Cronkhite
Anick (Pieper) – pp, ea – 58:02	2–4

10 min
Penalties
10 min
32
Shots
33

=== Semifinals ===
==== (2) Amherst v. (3) Middlebury ====
March 28, 2025; 4:00 pm	Amherst	3–1 (0–0, 0–0, 3–1)	Middlebury	Hunt Arena, River Falls, Wisconsin; Attendance: 603

Natalie Stott
Goalies
Sophia Will
Referees:
Michaela Bahl
Dan Olson
Linesmen:
Eric Frykman
Joe Setrum

Xu (Baxter, Mancini) – pp – 41:57	1–0
	1–1	47:30 – Ziegler (Appleyard)
Xu (Reynolds) – 53:03	2–1
Flynn (Abban, Baxter) – en – 59:10	3–1

6 min
Penalties
4 min
18
Shots
21

==== (4) Wisconsin–River Falls v. (1) Augsburg ====
March 28, 2025; 8:00 pm	Wisconsin–River Falls	4–2 (1–1, 1–1, 2–0)	Augsburg	Hunt Arena, River Falls, Wisconsin; Attendance: 1,758

Jordan O'Kane
Goalies
Kayla Simonson
Referees:
Mark Knapp Jr
Heidi Niskanen
Linesmen:
Kyle Niskanen
Madeline Lane

A. Niccum (Jones) – 3:41	1–0
	1–1	17:49 – Brehm (Schulte, Cronkhite)
	1–2	24:20 – Schulte (Brehm, Stepan)
Lavergne (Bielenberg-Howarth, K. Niccum) – 37:26	2–2
Goodreau (Brice) – 51:15	3–2
Lindquist (Kadrlik, Olson) – 54:21	4–2

8 min
Penalties
4 min
29
Shots
24

=== Championship ===
==== (2) Amherst v. (4) Wisconsin–River Falls ====
March 30, 2025; 4:00 pm	Amherst	1–3 (0–0, 1–3, 0–0)	Wisconsin–River Falls	Hunt Arena, River Falls, Wisconsin; Attendance: 1,682

Natalie Stott
Goalies
Jordan O'Kane
Referees:
Michaela Bahl
Heidi Niskanen
Linesmen:
Joe Setrum
Erik Frykman

	0–1	20:40 – Aure (Olson)
	0–2	27:08 – Kadrlik (Olson, Carothers)
Flynn (Raffin, Abban) – 31:53	1–2
	1–3	37:00 – Olson (Lindquist, A. Niccum)

2 min
Penalties
6 min
17
Shots
28

== See also ==
- NCAA Division III women's ice hockey tournament
