= Laura Hurd Award =

Annual award

The Laura Hurd Award is an annual award given to the top player in NCAA Division III Women's Ice Hockey. It is given by the American Hockey Coaches Association. It was known as the Division III Women's Player of the Year Award prior to 2007.

In January 2007, the AHCA voted to rename the Division III Women's Player of the Year after Laura Hurd, who played collegiately at Elmira College and was killed in a car accident in 2006, a year after winning the award. Hurd holds the NCAA Division III record for career scoring with 237 points over four years; she was a four-time All-American and led Elmira to two national championships.

== Award winners ==
Laura Hurd Award winners
| Year | Winner | Position | School | Ref. |
|---|---|---|---|---|
| 2000 | Sylvia Ryan | Forward | Middlebury | |
| 2001 | Michelle Labbe | Forward | Middlebury | |
| 2002 | Sarah Moe | Forward | Gustavus Adolphus | |
| 2003 | Angela Kapus | Forward/Defense | Middlebury | |
| 2004 | Molly Wasserman | Forward | Williams | |
| 2005 | Laura Hurd | Forward | Elmira | |
| 2006 | Emily Quizon | Forward | Middlebury | |
| 2007 | Andrea Peterson | Defense | Gustavus Adolphus | |
| 2008 | Danielle Blanchard | Forward | Plattsburgh State | |
| 2009 | Kayla Coady | Forward | Elmira | |
| 2010 | Isabel Iwachiw | Goaltender | Trinity | |
| 2011 | Sarah Dagg | Forward | RIT | |
| 2012 | Julie Fortier | Forward | Norwich | |
| 2013 | Teal Gove | Forward | Plattsburgh State | |
| 2014 | Sydney Aveson | Goaltender | Plattsburgh State | |
| 2015 | Ashley Ryan | Forward | Elmira | |
| 2016 | Michelle Greeneway | Forward | Lake Forest | |
| 2017 | Dani Sibley | Forward | Wisconsin–River Falls | |
| 2018 | Melissa Sheeran | Forward | Plattsburgh State | |
| 2019 | Bre Simon | Forward | Hamline | |
| 2020 | Amanda Conway | Forward | Norwich | |
| 2021 | Not awarded | | | |
| 2022 | Callie Hoff | Forward | Wisconsin–River Falls | |
| 2023 | Darci Matson | Forward | Aurora | |
| 2024 | Maddie McCollins | Forward | Wisconsin–River Falls | |
| 2025 | Bailey Olson | Forward | Wisconsin–River Falls | |
| 2026 | Megan Goodreau | Forward | Wisconsin–River Falls | |

=== Winners by school ===
Number of Laura Hurd Award winners by school
| School | Winners |
|---|---|
| UW–River Falls | 5 |
| Middlebury College | 4 |
| SUNY Plattsburgh | 4 |
| Elmira College | 3 |
| Gustavus Adolphus College | 2 |
| Norwich University | 2 |
| Rochester Institute of Technology | 1 |
| Trinity College | 1 |
| Williams College | 1 |
| Lake Forest College | 1 |
| Hamline University | 1 |
| Aurora University | 1 |

=== Winners by position ===
Number of Laura Hurd Award winners by position
| Position | Winners |
|---|---|
| Forward | 22 |
| Goaltender | 2 |
| Defense | 1 |
| Forward/Defense | 1 |

== See also ==
- Patty Kazmaier Award - D-I women's equivalent
- Sid Watson Award - D-III men's equivalent
- Hobey Baker Award - D-I men's equivalent
