= Mark Bolding =

American ice hockey coach (born 1970)

Current position
- Title: Head coach
- Team: Yale
- Conference: ECAC
- Record: 130–65–6

Biographical details
- Born: April 21, 1970 (age 56); Red Deer, Alberta, Canada

Coaching career (HC unless noted)
- 2007–2019: Norwich
- 2020–present: Yale

Head coaching record
- Overall: 396–133–46

Accomplishments and honors

Awards
- 3× ECAC Coach of the Year (2022, 2023, 2026); AHCA Coach of the Year (2022); 4× NCAA Division III AHCA Coach of the Year (2010–12, 2018)

Mark Bolding (born April 21, 1970) is a Canadian ice hockey coach. He is the current head coach for Yale. He previously served as the head coach for Norwich, where he won two NCAA Division III women's ice hockey tournament championships in 2011 and 2018.

== Playing career ==
Bolding played college ice hockey at Norwich from 1991 to 1994. He served as captain during his final three seasons, and finished his career at Norwich with 21 goals and 73 assists for 94 points. In 2005, he was inducted into the Norwich University Athletic Hall of Fame.

== Coaching career ==
=== Norwich University ===
Following his playing career, Bolding was hired by Mike McShane as an assistant coach at Norwich in 1996. He again served as an assistant coach during the 1999–2000 season, and helped the team win their first NCAA Division III men's ice hockey tournament national championship.

Bolding was named the inaugural head coach at Norwich during the 2007–08 season. During the 2009–10 season, he led the Cadets to a 20–6–5 record and their first NCAA Division III women's ice hockey tournament championship game, where they lost to Amherst. During the 2010–11 season, he led the Cadets to a 25–4–1 record and their first NCAA Division III national championship in program history. During the 2011–12 season, he led the Cadets to a 27–3–1 record and their third consecutive NCAA Division III national championship game. During the 2013–14 season, he led the Cadets to a 27–4–0, including a perfect 16–0–0 record during conference play. They became the first team in New England Hockey Conference (NEHC) history to finish with a perfect conference record. During the 2017–18 season, he led the Cadets to a 27–1–3, and their second NCAA Division III national championship.

On April 9, 2019, Bolding stepped down as head coach at Norwich. During his tenure at Norwich, he compiled a 266–68–22 overall record. He guided the Cadets to nine New England Hockey Conference titles, the NCAA Division III women's ice hockey tournament Frozen Four six times, the national championship game five times, and two national championships. He became the seventh coach in NCAA Division III history to reach the 200-win milestone. He was named the NCAA Division III American Hockey Coaches Association (AHCA) National Coach of the Year four times.

=== Yale University ===
On April 10, 2019, Bolding was named the head coach at Yale. During the 2021–22 season, he led the Bulldogs to a 26–9–1 record, and their first NCAA women's ice hockey tournament appearance in program history, where they advanced to the Frozen Four. Following the season, he was named ECAC Coach of the Year and AHCA Coach of the Year. During the 2022–23 season, he led the Bulldogs to a 28–4–1 record, and their first ever ECAC conference regular season championship. Following the season, he was named ECAC Coach of the Year for the second consecutive year.

== Head coaching record ==
Record table
| Season | Team | Overall | Conference | Standing | Postseason |
|---|---|---|---|---|---|
Norwich University (NEHC) (2007–2019)
| 2007–08 | Norwich | 12–11–2 | 9–8–2 | 4th | |
| 2008–09 | Norwich | 19–9–1 | 14–6–1 | 3rd | |
| 2009–10 | Norwich | 20–6–5 | 13–3–3 | 3rd | NCAA Division III Runner-Up |
| 2010–11 | Norwich | 25–4–1 | 17–0–1 | 1st | NCAA Division III Champion |
| 2011–12 | Norwich | 27–3–1 | 17–0–1 | 1st | NCAA Division III Runner-Up |
| 2012–13 | Norwich | 22–4–3 | 16–2–0 | 1st | |
| 2013–14 | Norwich | 27–4–0 | 16–0–0 | 1st | NCAA Division III Runner-Up |
| 2014–15 | Norwich | 22–6–3 | 15–0–2 | 1st | |
| 2015–16 | Norwich | 21–7–0 | 15–2–0 | 1st | |
| 2016–17 | Norwich | 23–7–1 | 18–1–0 | 2nd | NCAA Division III Frozen Four |
| 2017–18 | Norwich | 27–1–3 | 17–0–0 | 1st | NCAA Division III Champion |
| 2018–19 | Norwich | 21–4–2 | 18–0–1 | 1st | NCAA Division III First Round |
| Norwich: | | 266–68–22 | 185–22–11 | | |
Yale University (ECAC) (2019–present)
| 2019–20 | Yale | 17–15–0 | 13–9–0 | 5th | |
| 2021–22 | Yale | 26–9–1 | 16–5–1 | 2nd | NCAA Frozen Four |
| 2022–23 | Yale | 28–4–1 | 19–2–1 | 1st | NCAA Quarterfinals |
| 2023–24 | Yale | 17–14–1 | 12–9–1 | 6th | |
| 2024–25 | Yale | 16–13–3 | 10–10–2 | 6th | |
| 2025–26 | Yale | 26–10–0 | 16–6–0 | 1st | NCAA Quarterfinals |
| Yale: | | 130–65–6 | 86–41–5 | | |
| Total: | | 396–133–46 | | | |
National champion Postseason invitational champion Conference regular season champion Conference regular season and conference tournament champion Division regular season champion Division regular season and conference tournament champion Conference tournament champion

== See also ==
- List of college women's ice hockey career coaching wins leaders
