= Colonial Hockey Conference =

Defunct NCAA Division III athletic conference

- Formerly: ECAC North Atlantic
- Association: NCAA
- Founded: 2015
- Ceased: 2020 (absorbed by Commonwealth Coast Conference)
- Commissioner: Katie Boldvich
- Sports fielded: Women's ice hockey
- Division: Division III
- No. of teams: 4
- Region: Northeastern U.S.
- Official website: http://colonialhockey.com

The Colonial Hockey Conference (CHC) was an athletic conference that operated in the northeastern United States. It participated in the NCAA's Division III as an ice hockey-only conference and included only women's teams.

The formation of the conference was originally announced in late 2014 under the ECAC umbrella, with the conference to be known as the ECAC North Atlantic. The eight founding institutions all had either independent or newly formed women's hockey teams, so no teams had to switch conferences to join the ECAC-NA. In 2015, however, just before the conference's first season commenced, the members announced that the conference would be renamed the Colonial Hockey Conference, dropping the ECAC affiliation. The conference lasted until the 2019-20 season, when the Commonwealth Coast Conference, now known as the Conference of New England, took over operations. At that time, all of the remaining members of the CHC were full members of the CCC.

== Final Members ==
Institution	Location	Nickname	Founded	Affiliation	Undergraduate enrollment	Joined	Championships	Men's conference	Primary conference	Colors
Endicott College	Beverly, MA	Gulls	1939	Private	2,485	2015		CCC	CCC	
Nichols College	Dudley, MA	Bison	1815	Private	1,459	2017		CCC	CCC	
Salve Regina University	Newport, RI	Seahawks	1934	Private	2,686	2019		CCC	CCC	
University of New England	Biddeford, ME	Nor'easters	1831	Private	2,582	2019		CCC	CCC	

=== Former members ===
- Becker College (2021, dropped program)
  - Becker closed.
- Daniel Webster College (2016, dropped program)
  - Daniel Webster was a founding institution in 2015, but the college went bankrupt in 2016. It was able to field a men's team for its last academic year, 2016–17, but the women's team didn't have enough players.
- Johnson and Wales University (2018, joined the New England Hockey Conference
- Morrisville State College (2019, joined Northeast Women's Hockey League)
- Salem State University (2018, joined New England Hockey Conference)
- Stevenson University (2017, joined the United Collegiate Hockey Conference)
- SUNY Canton (2019, joined Northeast Women's Hockey League)
