= Norwich Cadets women's ice hockey =

NCAA Division III program of Norwich University

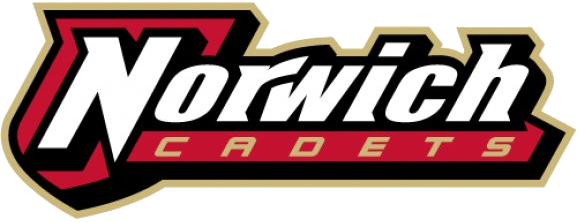
- University: Norwich University
- Conference: LEC
- Head coach: Justin Simpson; 1st season, 26–3–0
- Arena: Kreitzberg Arena; Northfield, Vermont
- Colors: Maroon and Gold

NCAA tournament champions
- 2011, 2018

NCAA tournament Frozen Four
- 2010, 2011, 2012, 2014, 2015, 2017, 2018, 2026

NCAA tournament appearances
- 2009, 2010, 2011, 2012, 2013, 2014, 2015, 2017, 2018, 2019, 2020, 2023, 2026

Conference tournament champions
- 2009, 2010, 2012, 2013, 2014, 2015, 2017, 2018, 2019, 2020, 2023, 2026

Conference regular season champions
- 2011, 2012, 2013, 2014, 2015, 2016, 2018, 2019, 2020, 2024, 2025, 2026

The Norwich Cadets women's ice hockey team represents Norwich University in Northfield, Vermont. The school's women's team competes in NCAA Division III women's ice hockey, as part of the Little East Conference (LEC).

== History ==
The 2007–08 season marked the inaugural season of the Norwich Cadets as a varsity team. Mark Bolding was named the program's first head coach and would go on to coach twelve seasons with the Cadets. Sophie Leclerc led the club with 13 goals and 27 points and ranked second for assists, with 14.

During the 2008–09 campaign, the Cadets enjoyed their first-ever ECAC East Conference Tournament championship. In the Cadets final 16 contests, they went 13–2–1, leading up to a 4–0 win over Salve Regina in the conference championship game. Four Cadets players named to the ECAC East All-Tournament team. The Cadets made their first NCAA Tournament appearance before falling to eventual runner-up Elmira 3–2 in the quarterfinals.

In the 2010 NCAA Division III Quarterfinals, Sophie Leclerc scored the game-winning goal versus Plattsburgh State with 42 seconds left. She was part of a Cadets team that lost the 2010 NCAA Final to Amherst by a 7–2 tally.

The Cadets were led by team captain Sophie Leclerc as the Cadets won their first Division III title in 2011. This was accomplished in only the fourth year of the program. The Cadets set program records in wins (25) and conference victories (17). On January 28, 2011, Julie Fortier notched the 50th goal of her career with a hat trick versus New England College as the Cadets prevailed by a 3–2 tally. In a January 29 contest versus Castleton, she became the second player in program history to record 100 points in a career with a goal in the first period.

In the Division III title game, Leclerc contributed with two goals and an assist, as the Cadets defeated the RIT Tigers by a 5–2 mark. Her 54 points led the nation in scoring, while teammate Julie Fortier’s 45 points ranked second nationally (Fortier’s 23 goals tied a career high). Leclerc was featured in the April 4, 2011 issue of Sports Illustrated as part of its Faces in the Crowd section.

On December 4, 2011, Julie Fortier became the Cadets all-time goal-scoring leader as the Cadets logged a 5–0 victory over Holy Cross in Worcester, Massachusetts. Fortier contributed with two goals and a helper. With Norwich leading by a 1–0 tally, Fortier notched the 73rd goal of her career to surpass Sophie Leclerc.

On January 6, 2012, team captain Melissa Rundlett became just the third Norwich player in program history to reach 100 career points. She registered a goal and two assists to help the Cadets best Saint Michael's by a 9–0 mark. At the 5:36 mark of the first period, she assisted on Renee Lortie’s goal for the 99th career point. She would reach the milestone by scoring her seventh goal of the season at the 17:09 mark of the first period. Said goal gave Norwich a 5–0 advantage.

After twelve successful seasons, in which he amassed a 266–68–22 record, head coach Mark Bolding stepped down to accept the head coaching position with the Yale Bulldogs women's ice hockey program. The following month, on May 17, 2019, Sophie Leclerc was announced as the second head coach in program history.

== Season by season record ==
Won championship	Lost championship	Conference champions	League leader

Year	Coach	W	L	T	Conference	Conf. W	Conf. L	Conf. T	Finish	Conference Tournament	NCAA Tournament
2024–25	Sophie Leclerc	19	8	0	NEHC	16	1	0	1st NEHC	Won Quarterfinal vs. Albertus Magnus (6–1); Won Semifinal vs. William Smith (3–2 3OT); Lost Championship vs. Elmira (0–1)	Did not qualify
2023–24	Sophie Leclerc	19	6	2	NEHC	15	2	1	1st NEHC	Won Quarterfinals vs. Johnson & Wales (2–0); Lost Semifinals vs. Southern Maine (1–2 OT)	Did not qualify
2022–23	Sophie Leclerc	19	8	2	NEHC	14	2	2	2nd NEHC	Won Quarterfinal vs. Johnson & Wales (5–0); Won Semifinal vs. Southern Maine (2–1); Won Championship vs. Elmira (2–0)	Lost First Round vs. Colby (2–5)
2021–22	Sophie Leclerc	19	8	0	NEHC	13	3	0	2nd NEHC	Won Quarterfinals vs. Johnson & Wales (9–2); Lost Semifinals vs. Castleton (0–1)	Did not qualify
2020–21	Sophie Leclerc	7	1	0	–	–	–	–	–	–	–
2019–20	Sophie Leclerc	23	4	2	NEHC	16	0	0	1st NEHC	Won Quarterfinal vs. Salem St. (9–0); Won Semifinal vs. Plymouth St. (10–0); Won Championship vs. Suffolk (9–2)	Won First Round vs. Amherst (3–1); Quarterfinals vs. Plattsburgh St. cancelled due to COVID-19 pandemic
2018–19	Mark Bolding	21	4	2	NEHC	18	0	1	1st NEHC	Won Championship vs. Castleton (6–0)	Lost First Round vs. Williams (3–5)
2017–18	Mark Bolding	27	1	3	NEHC	17	0	0	1st NEHC	Won Semifinal vs. Plymouth St. (4–1); Won Championship vs. UMass Boston (7–0)	Won Quarterfinals vs. Morrisville (8–2); Won Semifinals vs. Hamline (5–1); Won Championship vs. Elmira (2–1)
2016–17	Mark Bolding	23	7	1	NEHC	18	1	0	2nd NEHC	Won Championship vs. Manhattanville (5–0)	Won First Round vs. Middlebury (5–4); Lost Semifinal vs. Plattsburgh St. (0–4)
2015–16	Mark Bolding	21	7	0	NEHC	15	2	0	1st NEHC	Lost Championship vs. UMass Boston (0–2)	
2014–15	Mark Bolding	22	6	3	ECAC East	15	0	2	1st ECAC East	Won Championship	
2013–14	Mark Bolding	27	4	0	ECAC East	16	0	0	1st ECAC East	Won Championship	Lost Championship vs. Williams (1–2)
2012–13	Mark Bolding	22	4	3	ECAC East	16	2	0	1st ECAC East	Won Championship	
2011–12	Mark Bolding	27	3	1	ECAC East	17	0	1	1st ECAC East	Won Championship	Lost Championship vs. RIT (–)
2010–11	Mark Bolding	25	4	1	ECAC East	17	0	1	1st ECAC East	Won Championship	Won Championship vs. RIT (–)
2009–10	Mark Bolding	20	6	5	ECAC East	13	3	3	3rd ECAC East	Won Championship	Lost Championship vs. Amherst (2–7)
2008–09	Mark Bolding	19	9	1	ECAC East	14	6	1	3rd ECAC East	Won Championship	
2007–08	Mark Bolding	12	11	2	ECAC East	9	8	2	4th ECAC East	Did not qualify	Did not qualify

Source: USCHO; NCAA, NEHC

== Awards and honors ==
- Mark Bolding, American Hockey Coaches Association (AHCA) National "Coach of the Year" (2009–10)
- Mark Bolding, American Hockey Coaches Association (AHCA) National "Coach of the Year" (2010–11)
- Julie Fortier, ECAC East Division III Women’s Player of the Week (Week of November 14, 2011)
- Julie Fortier, ECAC East Division III Women’s Player of the Week (Week of November 21, 2011)
- Julie Fortier, 2012 Laura Hurd Award Winner
- Amanda Conway, 2020 Laura Hurd Award Winner
- Emily Lambert, 2020 College Sports Information Directors of America (CoSIDA) Academic All-American At-Large First Team
- Sophie Leclerc, 2007–08 ECAC East Second team
- Sophie Leclerc, 2008–09 ECAC East Second team
- Sophie Leclerc, 2008–09 ECAC East Tournament Most Outstanding Player
- Sophie Leclerc, 2008–09 ECAC East All-Tournament team
- Sophie Leclerc, 2009–10 NCAA Division III All-Tournament team
- Sophie Leclerc, 2009–10 New England Division II-III All-Star
- Sophie Leclerc, 2009–10 ECAC East Second Team selection
- Sophie Leclerc, 2010–11 ECAC East scoring champion
- Sophie Leclerc, 2010–11 ECAC Division III Player of the year
- Sophie Leclerc, 2010–11 Division III AHCA All-America selection.
- Amanda Wilks, 2008–09 Division III AHCA All-America selection
