= Middlebury Panthers women's ice hockey =

- University: Middlebury College
- Conference: NESCAC
- Head coach: Bill Mandigo; 38 season, 698–185–60
- Arena: Kenyon Arena; Middlebury, Vermont
- Colors: Blue and White

AWCHA tournament champions
- 2000, 2001

NCAA tournament champions
- 2004, 2005, 2006, 2022

NCAA tournament runner-up
- 2007, 2013

NCAA tournament Frozen Four
- 2004, 2005, 2006, 2007, 2009, 2011, 2013, 2016, 2022, 2024, 2025

NCAA tournament appearances
- 2002, 2003, 2004, 2005, 2006, 2007, 2008, 2009, 2011, 2012, 2013, 2015, 2016, 2017, 2018, 2020, 2022, 2023, 2024, 2025

Conference tournament champions
- ECAC: 1996, 1997, 1998, 1999, 2000, 2001; NESCAC: 2001, 2003, 2005, 2006, 2009, 2011, 2012, 2016, 2017, 2018, 2022, 2024

Conference regular season champions
- 2001, 2002, 2006, 2007, 2008, 2011, 2012, 2013, 2014, 2015, 2016, 2017, 2018, 2020, 2022

The Middlebury College Panthers women's ice hockey team competes at the Division III level as part of the National Collegiate Athletic Association (NCAA). They represent Middlebury College and compete in the New England Small College Athletic Conference (NESCAC).

== History ==
The team was founded in 1981 and was coached by Duke Nelson in their inaugural season. They joined the ECAC East Conference in 1984 and were a member until 2001 when they left to join the NESCAC. They won six consecutive ECAC championships as a member of the conference. The program won the 2000 and 2001 AWCHA championships.

After joining the NESCAC, the Panthers have since won 12 tournament championships, and 15 regular season titles. They have made a record 20 appearances in the NCAA Division III women's ice hockey tournament, with 11 appearances in the Frozen Four, six title game appearances, and four national championships. Their 2022 championship was captured in record fashion, becoming the first women's ice hockey program to finish with an undefeated season.

Head coach Bill Mandigo began coaching the Panthers during the 1988–89 season, and is the winningest coach in women's ice hockey across all three divisions with 681 victories at the conclusion of the 2024–25 season. Mandigo announced his retirement following the conclusion of the 2025–26 season. He was set to retire with an all-time 698-185-60 record, and 38 seasons at Middlebury. However on May 5, 2026, he postponed his retirement.

== Season-by-season results ==
| Won championship | Lost championship | Conference champions |

| Year | Coach | W | L | T | Conference | Conf. W | Conf. L | Conf. T | Finish | Conference Tournament | NCAA Tournament |
| 2025–26 | Bill Mandigo | 17 | 5 | 4 | NESCAC | 11 | 2 | 3 | 1st | Won Quarterfinals vs. Trinity (1-0); Lost Semifinals vs. Colby (1-2 3OT) | Did not qualify |
| 2024–25 | Bill Mandigo | 21 | 7 | 1 | NESCAC | 10 | 5 | 1 | 2nd | Won Quarterfinals vs. Williams (2-1 OT); Won Semifinals vs. Colby (3-0); Lost Championship vs. Amherst (0-1) | Won Quarterfinals vs. Nazareth (1-0); Lost Semifinals vs. Amherst (1-3) |
| 2023–24 | Bill Mandigo | 18 | 7 | 4 | NESCAC | 10 | 3 | 3 | 2nd | Won Quarterfinals vs. Williams (4-1); Won Semifinals vs. Colby (3-0); Won Championship vs. Hamilton (4-0) | Won First Round vs. Western New England (8-0); Won Quarterfinals vs. Plattsburgh State (2-0); Lost Semifinals vs. Elmira (0-1) |
| 2022–23 | Bill Mandigo | 17 | 8 | 3 | NESCAC | 10 | 4 | 2 | 4th | Won Quarterfinals vs. Connecticut College (4-0); Lost Semifinals vs. Amherst (0-2) | Won First Round vs. Suffolk (4-0); Lost Quarterfinals vs. Plattsburgh State (2-4) |
| 2021–22 | Bill Mandigo | 27 | 0 | 0 | NESCAC | 15 | 0 | 0 | 1st | Won Quarterfinals vs. Connecticut College (2-1); Won Semifinals vs. Hamilton (3-2); Won Championship vs. Amherst (2-0) | Won Quarterfinals vs. Endicott (4-0); Won Semifinals vs. Elmira (3-2); Won Championship vs. Gustavus Adolphus (3-2 OT) |
| 2020–21 | Bill Mandigo | Did not play due to COVID-19 | | | | | | | | | |
| 2019–20 | Bill Mandigo | 21 | 3 | 3 | NESCAC | 14 | 1 | 1 | 1st | Won Quarterfinals vs. Trinity (4-1); Won Semifinals vs. Hamilton (2-1); Lost Championship vs. Amherst (1-2) | Tournament cancelled due to COVID-19 |
| 2018–19 | Bill Mandigo | 16 | 8 | 3 | NESCAC | 9 | 5 | 2 | 2nd | Won Quarterfinals vs. Connecticut College (3-2 OT); Won Semifinals vs. Hamilton (3-1); Lost Championship vs. Williams (2-3) | Did not qualify |
| 2017–18 | Bill Mandigo | 20 | 5 | 3 | NESCAC | 13 | 1 | 2 | 1st | Won Quarterfinals vs. Wesleyan (5-0); Won Semifinals vs. Bowdoin (2-1); Won Championship vs. Amherst (2-0) | Lost Quarterfinals vs. Plattsburgh State (1-3) |
| 2016–17 | Bill Mandigo | 19 | 7 | 2 | NESCAC | 11 | 4 | 1 | 1st | Won Quarterfinals vs. Wesleyan (4-1); Won Semifinals vs. Bowdoin (4-1); Won Championship vs. Amherst (4-1) | Lost Quarterfinals vs. Norwich (4-5 2OT) |
| 2015–16 | Bill Mandigo | 21 | 6 | 3 | NESCAC | 13 | 0 | 3 | 1st | Won Quarterfinals vs. Colby (4-3); Won Semifinals vs. Trinity (3-1); Won Championship vs. Amherst (5-4 OT) | Won Quarterfinals vs. UMass Boston (4-0); Lost Semifinals vs. Plattsburgh State (3-5); Lost Third Place Game vs. Elmira (1-4) |
| 2014–15 | Bill Mandigo | 20 | 5 | 3 | NESCAC | 13 | 1 | 2 | 1st | Won Quarterfinals vs. Hamilton (3-2 4OT); Won Semifinals vs. Bowdoin (4-2); Lost Championship vs. Trinity (2-3 OT) | Lost Quarterfinals vs. Norwich (2-3) |
| 2013–14 | Bill Mandigo | 14 | 4 | 4 | NESCAC | 12 | 0 | 4 | 1st | Lost Quarterfinals vs. Connecticut College (1-2 OT) | Did not qualify |
| 2012–13 | Bill Mandigo | 20 | 8 | 2 | NESCAC | 12 | 2 | 2 | 1st | Won Quarterfinals vs. Colby (6-0); Won Semifinals vs. Connecticut College (4-1); Lost Championship vs. Bowdoin (1-2) | Won Quarterfinals vs. Norwich (3-2 OT); Won Semifinals vs. Plattsburgh State (4-1); Lost Championship vs. Elmira (0-1) |
| 2011–12 | Bill Mandigo | 21 | 4 | 3 | NESCAC | 14 | 2 | 0 | 1st | Won Quarterfinals vs. Colby (5-1); Won Semifinals vs. Trinity (4-1); Won Championship vs. Amherst (1-0 OT) | Lost Quarterfinals vs. Plattsburgh State (2-4) |
| 2010–11 | Bill Mandigo | 23 | 5 | 1 | NESCAC | 14 | 1 | 1 | 1st | Won Quarterfinals vs. Williams (6-2); Won Semifinals vs. Bowdoin (4-0); Won Championship vs. Amherst (4-3) | Won Quarterfinals vs. Manhattanville (1-0); Lost Semifinals vs. RIT (2-5); Won Third Place Game vs. Gustavus Adolphus (5-0) |
| 2009–10 | Bill Mandigo | 16 | 7 | 3 | NESCAC | 11 | 4 | 1 | 3rd | Won Quarterfinals vs. Hamilton (8-1); Lost Semifinals vs. Trinity (1-2 4OT) | Did not qualify |
| 2008–09 | Bill Mandigo | 20 | 4 | 4 | NESCAC | 12 | 2 | 2 | 2nd | Won Quarterfinals vs. Williams (3-1); Won Semifinals vs. Colby (4-2); Won Championship vs. Amherst (4-3 OT) | Lost Semifinals vs. Amherst (2-3); Won Third Place Game vs. Wisconsin River-Falls (3-2 OT) |
| 2007–08 | Bill Mandigo | 19 | 4 | 3 | NESCAC | 13 | 0 | 3 | 1st | Lost Semifinals vs. Colby (2-3 OT) | Lost Quarterfinals vs. Manhattanville (3-4 OT) |
| 2006–07 | Bill Mandigo | 23 | 4 | 2 | NESCAC | 14 | 0 | 2 | 1st | Won Semifinals vs. Hamilton (7-2); Lost Championship vs. Amherst (1-2 3OT) | Won Quarterfinals vs. Manhattanville (3-1); Won Semifinals vs. Wisconsin Stevens Point (5-1); Lost Championship vs. Plattsburgh State (1-2) |
| 2005–06 | Bill Mandigo | 27 | 2 | 0 | NESCAC | 15 | 1 | 0 | 1st | Won Semifinals vs. Colby (3-1); Won Championship vs. Bowdoin (8-2) | Won Quarterfinals vs. Manhattanville (4-3); Won Semifinals vs. Gustavus Adolphus (2-1); Won Championship vs. Plattsburgh State (3-1) |
| 2004–05 | Bill Mandigo | 26 | 3 | 1 | NESCAC | 14 | 1 | 1 | 2nd | Won Quarterfinals vs. Trinity (6-0); Won Semifinals vs. Williams (4-1); Won Championship vs. Bowdoin (5-1) | Won Quarterfinals vs. Manhattanville (3-2 OT); Won Semifinals vs. Gustavus Adolphus (7-3); Won Championship vs. Elmira (4-3) |
| 2003–04 | Bill Mandigo | 24 | 4 | 0 | NESCAC | 15 | 1 | 0 | 2nd | Won Quarterfinals vs. Connecticut College (6-0); Won Semifinals vs. Williams (5-1); Lost Championship vs. Bowdoin (1-4) | Won Quarterfinals vs. Elmira (2-1); Won Semifinals vs. Plattsburgh State (7-3); Won Championship vs. Wisconsin Stevens Point (2-1) |
| 2002–03 | Bill Mandigo | 19 | 3 | 4 | NESCAC | 12 | 0 | 4 | 2nd | Won Quarterfinals vs. Amherst (9-0); Won Semifinals vs. Williams (3-2); Won Championship vs. Bowdoin (4-0) | Lost Quarterfinals vs. Bowdoin (0-3) |
| 2001–02 | Bill Mandigo | 19 | 3 | 1 | NESCAC | 16 | 0 | 0 | 1st | Lost Semifinals vs. Williams (1-2) | Lost Quarterfinals vs. Bowdoin (1-2) |
| 2000–01 | Bill Mandigo | 23 | 1 | 1 | NESCAC | 8 | 0 | 1 | 1st | Won Quarterfinals vs. Sacred Heart (8-1); Won Semifinals vs. Colgate (3-1); Won Championship vs. Williams (3-0) | Won Semifinals vs. St. Mary's (3-1); Won Championship vs. Gustavus Adolphus (6-0) |
| 1999–00 | Bill Mandigo | 24 | 2 | 0 | ECAC East | 16 | 0 | 0 | 1st | Won Quarterfinals vs. RIT (5-0); Won Semifinals vs. RPI (6-0); Won Championship vs. Colgate (5-1) | Won Championship vs. Augsburg (5-1, 8-1) |
| 1998–99 | Bill Mandigo | 21 | 1 | 0 | ECAC East | | | | | Won Championship | |
| 1997–98 | Bill Mandigo | 20 | 4 | 0 | ECAC East | | | | | Won Championship | |
| 1996–97 | Bill Mandigo | 19 | 6 | 0 | ECAC East | | | | | Won Championship | |
| 1995–96 | Bill Mandigo | 19 | 6 | 0 | ECAC East | | | | | Won Championship | |
| 1994–95 | Bill Mandigo | 11 | 12 | 0 | ECAC East | | | | | | |
| 1993–94 | Bill Mandigo | 15 | 9 | 0 | ECAC East | | | | | | |
| 1992–93 | Bill Mandigo | 11 | 7 | 0 | ECAC East | | | | | | |
| 1991–92 | Bill Mandigo | 11 | 6 | 1 | ECAC East | | | | | | |
| 1990–91 | Bill Mandigo | 10 | 6 | 0 | ECAC East | | | | | | |
| 1989–90 | Bill Mandigo | 12 | 4 | 1 | ECAC East | | | | | | |
| 1988–89 | Bill Mandigo | 10 | 5 | 0 | ECAC East | | | | | | |
| 1987–88 | Mike Gerber | 11 | 3 | 0 | ECAC East | | | | | | |
| 1986–87 | Bob Ritter | 6 | 6 | 2 | ECAC East | | | | | | |
| 1985–86 | Bob Ritter | 10 | 5 | 0 | ECAC East | | | | | | |
| 1984–85 | Bob Ritter | 8 | 7 | 0 | ECAC East | | | | | | |
| 1983–84 | Bob Ritter | 10 | 5 | 0 | | | | | | | |
| 1982–83 | Duke Nelson | 7 | 6 | 1 | | | | | | | |
| 1981–82 | Duke Nelson | 7 | 8 | 0 | | | | | | | |

== Career records ==
=== Career points ===
| Rank | Player | Points | Years |
| 1 | Michelle Labbe | 240 | 1997–01 |
| 2 | Jennifer Hefner | 216 | 1993–97 |
| 3 | Sylvia Ryan | 206 | 1996–00 |
| 4 | Whitney Parks | 173 | 1993–97 |
| 5 | Emily Quizon | 171 | 2002–06 |

=== Career goals ===
| Rank | Player | Points | Years |
| 1 | Sylvia Ryan | 114 | 1996–00 |
| 2 | Michelle Labbe | 108 | 1997–01 |
| 3 | Jennifer Hefner | 91 | 1993–97 |
| 4 | Whitney Parks | 89 | 1993–97 |
| 5 | Lorna Gifis | 77 | 2001–05 |

=== Career assists ===
| Rank | Player | Points | Years |
| 1 | Michelle Labbe | 132 | 1997–01 |
| 2 | Jennifer Hefner | 125 | 1993–97 |
| 3 | Emily Quizon | 107 | 2002–06 |
| 4 | Sylvia Ryan | 92 | 1996–00 |
| 5 | Annmarie Cellino | 89 | 2005–09 |

=== Saves ===
| Rank | Player | Points | Years |
| 1 | Christy Picard | 1,706 | 1992–96 |
| 2 | Annabelle Jones | 1,440 | 2011–15 |
| 3 | Alexi Bloom | 1,263 | 2007–11 |
| 4 | Kate Kogut | 1,258 | 2002–06 |
| 5 | Lin Han | 1,244 | 2016–20 |

=== Lowest GAA ===
| Rank | Player | Points | Years |
| 1 | Megan Hutchinson | 0.92 | 1998–02 |
| 2 | Kristin Hackmann | 0.98 | 1995–99 |
| 3 | Kati Madouros | 1.14 | 2000–04 |
| 4 | Sophia Merageas | 1.15 | 2022–25 |
| 5 | Lin Han | 1.25 | 2016–20 |
| 6 | Sophia Will | 1.35 | 2023–present |

=== Highest Save Percentage ===
| Rank | Player | Points | Years |
| 1 | Sophia Merageas | .947 | 2022–25 |
| 2 | Sophia Will | .944 | 2023–present |
| 3 | Lin Han | .940 | 2016–20 |
| 4 | Julia Neuburger | .935 | 2014–18 |
| 5 | Annabelle Jones | .934 | 2011–15 |
| 6 | Alexi Bloom | .929 | 2007–11 |

=== Most Shutouts ===
| Rank | Player | Points | Years |
| 1 | Megan Hutchinson | 25 | 1998–02 |
| 2 | Beth Denoncourt | 22 | 1996–00 |
| 3 | Kati Madouros | 19 | 2000–04 |
| T4 | Alexi Bloom | 18 | 2007–11 |
| T4 | Christy Picard | 18 | 1992–96 |
| 6 | Lin Han | 17 | 2016–20 |

== Single season records ==
=== Points ===
| Rank | Player | Points | Year |
| 1 | Michelle Labbe | 69 | 2000–01 |
| 2 | Jennifer Hefner | 66 | 1995–96 |
| T3 | Emily Quizon | 58 | 2004–05 |
| T3 | Sylvia Ryan | 58 | 1999–00 |
| T3 | Michelle Labbe | 58 | 1998–99 |
| T3 | Michelle Labbe | 58 | 1997–98 |

=== Goals ===
| Rank | Player | Points | Year |
| 1 | Sylvia Ryan | 33 | 1999–00 |
| 2 | Sylvia Ryan | 32 | 1997–98 |
| 3 | Michelle Labbe | 31 | 2000–-01 |
| T4 | Lorna Gifis | 27 | 2004–05 |
| T4 | Michelle Labbe | 27 | 1998–99 |
| T4 | Lara Goff | 27 | 1995–96 |
| T4 | Janice O’Neil | 27 | 1995–96 |
| T4 | Whitney Parks | 27 | 1995–96 |

=== Assists ===
| Rank | Player | Points | Year |
| 1 | Jennifer Hefner | 43 | 1995–96 |
| T2 | Emily Quizon | 38 | 2004–05 |
| T2 | Michelle Labbe | 38 | 2000–01 |
| 4 | Angela Kapus | 35 | 2002–03 |
| 5 | Michelle Labbe | 32 | 1997–98 |

=== Saves ===
| Rank | Player | Points | Year |
| 1 | Christy Picard | 474 | 1994–95 |
| 2 | Sophia Will | 453 | 2023–24 |
| 3 | Christy Picard | 447 | 1993–94 |
| 4 | Christy Picard | 431 | 1992–93 |
| 5 | Annabelle Jones | 408 | 2013–14 |
| 6 | Kate Kogut | 399 | 2005–06 |

=== Lowest GAA ===
| Rank | Player | Points | Year |
| 1 | Katie Madouras | 0.63 | 2001–02 |
| 2 | Kristin Hackmann | 0.71 | 1998–99 |
| 3 | Kati Madouros | 0.74 | 2000–01 |
| 4 | Megan Hutchinson | 0.77 | 2000–01 |
| 5 | Beth Denoncourt | 0.79 | 1999–00 |

=== Highest Save Percentage ===
| Rank | Player | Points | Year |
| 1 | Sophia Merageas | .957 | 2024–25 |
| T2 | Sophia Merageas | .956 | 2021–22 |
| T2 | Lin Han | .956 | 2019–20 |
| 4 | Sophia Will | .954 | 2023–24 |
| 5 | Kati Madouros | .951 | 2001–02 |
| 6 | Sophia Will | .949 | 2024–25 |

=== Most Shutouts ===
| Rank | Player | Points | Year |
| 1 | Alexi Bloom | 12 | 2010–11 |
| T2 | Sophia Will | 8 | 2023–24 |
| T2 | Beth Denoncourt | 8 | 1999–00 |
| T4 | Five players tied | 7 | |
| T4 | Lin Han (Most recent) | 7 | 2017–18 |

== Awards ==
=== Hockey Humanitarian Award ===
Meg Simon won the Hockey Humanitarian Award for the 2026 season, making her the first Panther to do so.

=== All-American Selections ===
| Year | Player | Team |
| 1999 | Catherine Elkins | First |
| 1999 | Michelle Labbe | First |
| 1999 | Catherine Pullins | First |
| 1999 | Sylvia Ryan | First |
| 2000 | Catherine Elkins | First |
| 2000 | Michelle Labbe | First |
| 2000 | Catherine Pullins | First |
| 2000 | Sylvia Ryan | First |
| 2001 | Catherine Elkins | First |
| 2001 | Michelle Labbe | First |
| 2001 | Amber Neil | First |
| 2002 | Catherine Elkins | First |
| 2002 | Amber Neil | Second |
| 2003 | Angela Kapus | First |
| 2003 | Amber Neil | First |
| 2004 | Shannon Tarrant | First |
| 2004 | Lorna Gifis | Second |
| 2004 | Emily Quizon | Second |
| 2005 | Emily Quizon | First |
| 2005 | Lorna Gifis | Second |
| 2005 | Shannon Tarrant | Second |
| 2006 | Emily Quizon | First |
| 2006 | Annmarie Cellino | Second |
| 2006 | Kate Kogut | Second |
| 2006 | Shannon Tarrant | Second |
| 2007 | Abby Kurtz-Phelan | First |
| 2007 | Shannon Tarrant | First |
| 2008 | Annmarie Cellino | First |
| 2008 | Karen Levin | First |
| 2008 | Anna McNally | Second |
| 2009 | Randi Dumont | First |
| 2010 | Anna McNally | Second |
| 2011 | Alexi Bloom | First |
| 2012 | Lauren Greer | Second |
| 2013 | Madison Styrbicki | Second |
| 2015 | Emily Fluke | First |
| 2015 | Carly Watson | Second |
| 2016 | Maddie Winslow | First |
| 2017 | Jessica Young | Second |
| 2017 | Carly Watson | Second |
| 2018 | Jenna Marotta | Second |
| 2019 | Jenna Marotta | Second |
| 2020 | Madie Leidt | Second |
| 2022 | Madie Leidt | First |
| 2022 | Claudia Vira | Second |
| 2025 | Sabrina Kim | First |

=== NESCAC Specialty Awards ===
| Year | Player | Award |
| 2003 | Angela Kapus | Player of the Year |
| 2004 | Bill Mandigo | Coach of the Year |
| 2005 | Emily Quizon | Player of the Year |
| 2006 | Emily Quizon | Player of the Year |
| 2006 | Emily Quizon | Player of the Year |
| 2006 | Annmarie Cellino | Rookie of the Year |
| 2007 | Abby Kurtz-Phelan | Player of the Year |
| 2008 | Annmarie Cellino | Player of the Year |
| 2008 | Anna McNally | Rookie of the Year |
| 2011 | Bill Mandigo | Coach of the Year |
| 2015 | Emily Fluke | Player of the Year |
| 2015 | Jessica Young | Rookie of the Year |
| 2016 | Maddie Winslow | Player of the Year |
| 2016 | Bill Mandigo | Coach of the Year |
| 2017 | Lizzie Sheline | Rookie of the Year |
| 2018 | Madie Leidt | Rookie of the Year |
| 2018 | Bill Mandigo | Coach of the Year |
| 2020 | Madie Leidt | Player of the Year |
| 2022 | Madie Leidt | Player of the Year |
| 2022 | Bill Mandigo | Coach of the Year |

=== All-NESCAC Selections ===
| Year | Player | Team |
| 2002 | Amber Neil | First |
| 2002 | Catherine Elkins | First |
| 2002 | Erin Neil | Second |
| 2002 | Megan Hutchinson | Second |
| 2003 | Angela Kapus | First |
| 2003 | Amber Neil | First |
| 2004 | Lorna Gifis | First |
| 2004 | Kate Kogut | First |
| 2004 | Emily Quizon | First |
| 2004 | Shannon Tarrant | First |
| 2005 | Lorna Gifis | First |
| 2005 | Kate Kogut | First |
| 2005 | Emily McNamara | First |
| 2005 | Emily Quizon | First |
| 2005 | Shannon Tarrant | Second |
| 2006 | Annmarie Cellino | First |
| 2006 | Kate Kogut | First |
| 2006 | Emily Quizon | First |
| 2006 | Shannon Tarrant | First |
| 2006 | Emily McNamara | Second |
| 2007 | Abby Kurtz-Phelan | First |
| 2007 | Shannon Tarrant | First |
| 2007 | Annmarie Cellino | Second |
| 2007 | Shannon Sylvester | Second |
| 2007 | Lani Wright | Second |
| 2008 | Annmarie Cellino | First |
| 2008 | Anna McNally | First |
| 2008 | Karen Levin | First |
| 2009 | Randi Dumont | First |
| 2009 | Molly Vitt | First |
| 2009 | Annmarie Cellino | Second |
| 2010 | Anna McNally | First |
| 2010 | Madison Styrbicki | Second |
| 2011 | Alexi Bloom | First |
| 2011 | Madison Styrbicki | First |
| 2011 | Julia Ireland | Second |
| 2012 | Lauren Greer | First |
| 2012 | Madison Styrbicki | First |
| 2012 | Sara Ugalde | First |
| 2013 | Madison Styrbicki | First |
| 2013 | Hannah Bielawski | Second |
| 2013 | Lauren Greer | Second |
| 2014 | Carly Watson | First |
| 2014 | Annabelle Jones | Second |
| 2014 | Jennifer Krakower | Second |
| 2015 | Emily Fluke | First |
| 2015 | Carly Watson | First |
| 2015 | Madeline Marsh | Second |
| 2015 | Jessica Young | Second |
| 2016 | Maddie Winslow | First |
| 2016 | Julia Wardwell | Second |
| 2016 | Jessica Young | Second |
| 2017 | Carly Watson | First |
| 2017 | Jessica Young | First |
| 2017 | Maddie Winslow | Second |
| 2018 | Jenna Marotta | First |
| 2018 | Jessica Young | First |
| 2019 | Madie Leidt | First |
| 2019 | Jenna Marotta | First |
| 2020 | Eva Hendrickson | First |
| 2020 | Madie Leidt | First |
| 2020 | Jenna Letterie | First |
| 2020 | Lin Han | Second |
| 2022 | Madie Leidt | First |
| 2022 | Jenna Letterie | First |
| 2022 | Claudia Vira | First |
| 2022 | Eva Hendrickson | Second |
| 2023 | Claudia Vira | First |
| 2023 | Jenna Letterie | Second |
| 2024 | Callia Ferraris | Second |
| 2024 | Avery McInerny | Second |
| 2025 | Cat Appleyard | First |
| 2025 | Sabrina Kim | First |
| 2025 | Jordan Hower | Second |
| 2025 | Cece Ziegler | Second |

=== CSC Academic All-America Program ===
- 2015: Emily Fluke

== Hall of Fame ==
Six former coaches or players have been inducted into the Middlebury College Athletics Hall of Fame.

- 2015: Michelle Labbe Hunter
- 2015: Duke Nelson
- 2020: Sylvia Ryan Gappa
- 2023: Edie MacAusland Mabrey
- 2023: Emily Quizon
- 2026: Lauren Greer
