= Wisconsin–River Falls Falcons women's ice hockey =

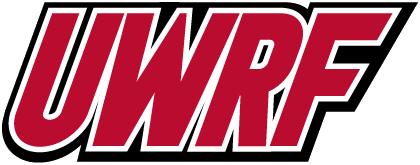
- University: University of Wisconsin-River Falls
- Conference: WIAC
- Head coach: Joe Cranston; 25th season, 492–157–46
- Arena: Hunt Arena; River Falls, Wisconsin
- Colors: Red and White
- Fight song: The Pledge Song

NCAA tournament champions
- 2024, 2025, 2026

NCAA tournament runner-up
- 2016

NCAA tournament Frozen Four
- 2003, 2009, 2014, 2015, 2016, 2024, 2025, 2026

NCAA tournament appearances
- 2003, 2009, 2010, 2011, 2012, 2013, 2014, 2015, 2016, 2017, 2019, 2020, 2022, 2023, 2024, 2025, 2026

Conference tournament champions
- NCHA: 2003, 2008, 2009, 2012; WIAC Champions: 2014, 2015, 2016, 2017, 2018, 2019, 2021, 2022, 2023, 2024, 2025

Conference regular season champions
- NCHA: 2003, 2009, 2011, 2012, 2013; WIAC Champions: 2014, 2015, 2016, 2017, 2018, 2019, 2021, 2022, 2023, 2024, 2025

The University of Wisconsin–River Falls (UWRF) women's ice hockey team competes at the Division III level as part of the National Collegiate Athletic Association (NCAA). They finished in the top four in 2003, 2009, 2014, 2015.

== History ==
The team was established in the year 2000, with Joe Cranston as the first head coach. The Falcons are a part of the Wisconsin Intercollegiate Athletic Conference (WIAC), which was once a part of the Northern Collegiate Hockey Association (NCHA). However, the WIAC announced in February 2012 that they would be leaving the NCHA due to budgetary reasons, effective for the 2014–15 season. The Falcons have currently joined the WIAC for the most recent seasons. The Falcons have won one national title, going undefeated with a record of 31-0-0 in 2024. The Falcons home arena is Hunt Arena, which opened in 1973 and is still home of the Falcons hockey teams. Cranston is currently the head coach of the Falcons, which have made six NCAA Frozen Four appearances since the program was established.

== Accomplishments ==
=== Championships ===
- NCAA DIII National Champions: 2024, 2025, 2026
- NCHA Tournament Champions: 2001, 2003, 2009, 2010, 2012
- WIAC Tournament Champions: 2014, 2015, 2016, 2017, 2020, 2021, 2022, 2023, 2024, 2025
- NCHA Regular Season Champions: 2003, 2009, 2011, 2012, 2013
- WIAC Regular Season Champions: 2014, 2015, 2016, 2017, 2018, 2019, 2021, 2022, 2023, 2024, 2025

=== Individual awards ===
Laura Hurd Award - Most outstanding player in NCAA Division III

- Dani Sibley - 2017
- Callie Hoff - 2022
- Maddie Collins - 2024
- Bailey Olson - 2025
- Megan Goodreau - 2026

AHCA Coach of the Year

- Joe Cranston - 2024

NCAA tournament Most Outstanding Player

- Maddie McCollins - 2024
- Bailey Olson - 2025

==== All–Americans ====
AHCA First Team All-Americans

- 2024: Maddie McCollins, F; MaKenna Aure, D
- 2023: Maddie McCollins, F
- 2022: Callie Hoff, F; Abigail Stow, F
- 2020: Hailey Herdine, D; Abigail Stow, F
- 2018: Carly Moran, F; Haley Nielsen, D
- 2017: Dani Sibley, F; Paige Johnson, D
- 2016: Chloe Kinsel, F
- 2015: Paige Johnson, D; Chloe Kinsel, F
- 2013: Kait Mason, F; Amanda Ryder, D
- 2011: Lauren Conrad, D; Kait Mason, F
- 2007: Amber Lindner, G
- 2006: Jenny Wallace, D
- 2005: Jenny Wallace, D
- 2004: Lindsy Carlson, D
- 2003: Marlene Yaeger, G; Lindsy Carlson, D; Ali Slinden, F

NCAA DIII All-Tournament Team

- 2024: Maddie McCollins, F; Madison Lavergne, F; MaKenna Aure, D
- 2016: Dani Sibley, F; Paige Johnson, D
- 2015: Paige Johnson, D
- 2014: Chloe Kinsel, F

== Coaching ==
Name	Career
Joe Cranston	492-157-46
