= Erin Whitten Hamlen =

American ice hockey goaltender and coach

- Born: October 26, 1971 (age 55) Glens Falls, New York, U.S.
- Height: 5 ft 5 in (165 cm)
- Position: Goaltender
- Caught: Left
- Played for: New Hampshire Wildcats; Dallas Freeze; Toledo Storm; Utica Blizzard; Muskegon Fury; Flint Generals
- Coached for: New Hampshire Wildcats; Boston Blades; UNE Nor'easters; Merrimack Warriors
- National team: United States
- Playing career: 1989–1999
- Coaching career: 2000–present
Medal record
World Championship
Silver medal – second place	1992 Finland
Silver medal – second place	1994 United States
Silver medal – second place	1997 Canada
Silver medal – second place	1999 Finland

Erin Hamlen née Whitten (born October 26, 1971) is an American former ice hockey goaltender and the former head coach of the Merrimack Warriors women's ice hockey program in the Hockey East (HEA) conference of the NCAA Division I. She was among the first women to play professional ice hockey and, on October 30, 1993, she became the first woman to earn a victory in a professional hockey game as a goaltender, in the Toledo Storm's 6–5 win over the Dayton Bombers in the East Coast Hockey League. As a member of the U.S. national team, she competed in and won silver medals at four IIHF Women's World Championships. She was USA Hockey Women's Player of the Year in 1994.

Hamlen previously spent ten years as an assistant and associate coach with the New Hampshire Wildcats women's ice hockey program and was the first head coach of the Boston Blades.

== Playing career ==
Hamlen is from Glens Falls, New York, where she grew up playing hockey with the neighborhood boys, starting at age 5. She moved to goaltending at age 12.

Hamlen played in the Adirondack Youth Hockey Association. In high school, she was the first female player for the Glens Falls Indians. She was a backup goaltender in her junior year and started in net as a senior.

In high school, she accumulated a 21–9 record with a 2.0 GAA. She was selected as a Central District High School Hockey League All-Star Honorable Mention. In 1989, she was the first female player to compete in the New York State Public High School Athletic Association (NYSPHSAA) Division 2 High School Hockey Championships.

Hamlen was recruited to play for women's teams at Northeastern University and the University of New Hampshire.

=== University of New Hampshire ===
Hamlen played all four years she attended the University of New Hampshire, before graduating with a bachelor's degree in psychology in 1993. Over four seasons she compiled a record of 54–14–4, with a .910 save percentage.

Hamlen shut out Dartmouth College in her collegiate debut and helped lead the Wildcats to two ECAC titles, in 1990 and 1991. As a college player, she was selected as First-Team All-Star four times. She won the ECAC Goaltender of the Year award in 1992.

At the time of her graduation, Hamlen held the UNH records for saves in a game (46), saves in a season (511), and career saves (1,556). She had 51 career victories -- second most in school history at the time.

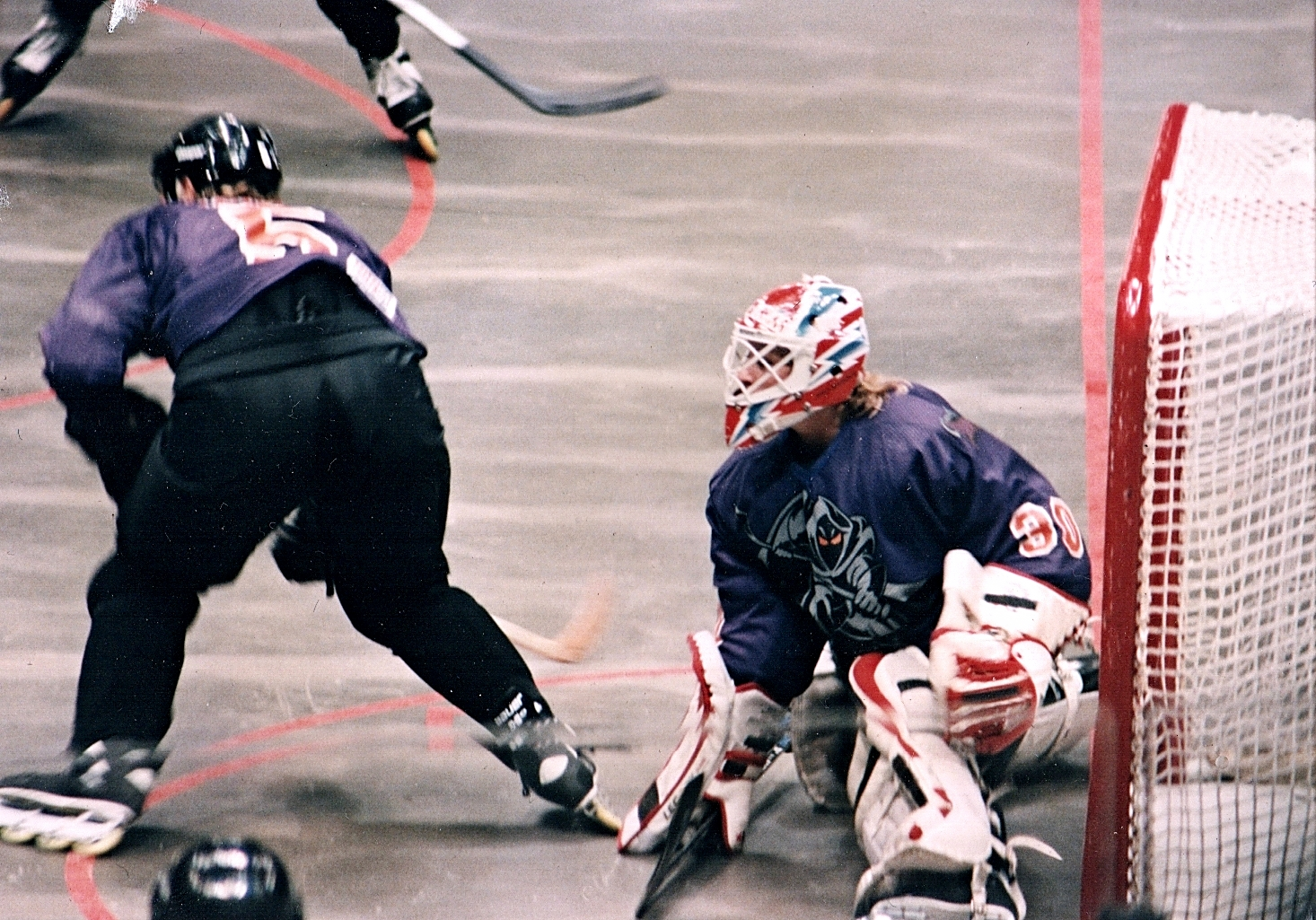
Erin Whitten, as part of pro hockey's first all-female goaltending showdown, pitting her and the Pittsburgh Phamtoms against the New Jersey Rockin Rollers (Manon Rheaume) at Brenden Byrne Arena, in the Meadowlands, New Jersey, on July 13, 1994.

=== Professional career ===
After her graduation from college, Hamlen was working at an Adirondack Red Wings summer camp when two players introduced her to agent Steve Bartlett, who also represented Manon Rheaume. He landed her an opportunity to tryout with the Red Wings, though she eventually signed with the Toledo Storm of the ECHL and coach Chris McSorley. “I’ve dressed everywhere from the women's bathroom to the closet,” she said in November 1993, of being the team's only female player. “If I could fit all the gear in a phone booth, I'm sure I'd have used one of those by now.”

As a goaltender with Toledo, she was the first woman to earn a victory in a professional ice hockey game, during a 6–5 win against the Dayton Bombers on October 30, 1993. Hamlen had come into a tied game for the injured Alain Harvey in the second period. The Storm clearly played with more intensity with Hamlen in net, according to the Toledo Blade. Barry Potomski, typically a Storm enforcer, tallied a hat-trick. Hamlen stopped 15 of 19 shots and was credited with the win.

At the time, Hamlen was under the misimpression that Rheaume, who had been the first woman to play in a pro hockey game during the prior season, had already recorded a win. “I'm not quite sure how to react because I just heard it myself,” Hamlen told the Toledo Blade after the game. She said it was “nice to be in the record books” but it had been “just another win. Hopefully there will be a few more.”

She told the Blade: “I'm doing what I love to do. Whether that makes history or not, it doesn't really matter to me. I just want to play hockey.”

Hamlen was 22 years old at the time, 5 feet, 5 inches tall, and weighed 155 pounds. She later told The Boston Globe's Dan Shaughnessy, “I'm glad I'm in the record books. Nobody can take that away. I'd like to play as much as I can and see how far I can take it.”

Hamlen also played professionally with the Dallas Freeze of the Central Hockey League (CHL) in the 1993–94 season.

She played in the Colonial Hockey League (CoHL) with the Utica Blizzard in the 1994–95 season and the Flint Generals in the 1995–96 season. She was the first woman to participate in a game in each of the leagues.

Hamlen also played roller hockey with the Pittsburgh Phantoms and the Oakland Skates.

=== U.S. women's national team ===
Hamlen was starting goaltender for the U.S. women's national ice hockey team from 1992 to 1997. She was USA Hockey Women's Player of the Year in 1994. Hamlen started as goaltender for the U.S. team during the IIHF Women's World Championship in 1992, 1994 and 1997. She was named outstanding goaltender in the 1994 World Championship.

Despite her age, Hamlen was still considered one of the top women's ice hockey players in the world in October 1997, four months prior to the 1998 Winter Olympic Games in Nagano, Japan. Ben Smith, coach of the U.S. national team, described her as “kind of the poster girl on the defensive side of things. Great athletic ability and has played some professional hockey with men. A real fine goalie and has taken up the challenge by the younger kids. Probably right now ranked one of the top in the world in women's hockey.” However, Hamlen slumped in the lead-up to the Olympics, going 0–3 and allowing 14 goals in pre-Olympic games against the Canadians, who were the defending World Champions. Smith cut her from the roster on December 20 in favor of goaltenders Sarah Tueting and Sara DeCosta. The U.S. national team went on to win its first Olympic gold medal in February 1998, during the first-ever Olympic women's ice hockey tournament. Finnish national team coach Rauni Korpi was reportedly incredulous at Hamlen's absence from the Games, asking two American reporters, “Why is Erin Whitten not here?”

Hamlen worked her way back to the U.S. national team's roster in 1999, when she was starting goaltender for the 1999 IIHF Women's World Championships. Then 27, she described her comeback to a reporter following a semifinal game against Finland, which the U.S. won, 3–1: “After being cut from the Olympics, I really didn't know if I was going to get another shot right away. I took a lot of time away, and I think it did some good for me mentally. It took a lot for me to build up the confidence again.” The U.S. team lost the next night to Canada, 3–1, which extended its streak of world championships to five. Hamlen was credited for keeping the U.S. in the game, with 27 saves. Smith was quoted as saying: “This might be the best game against Canada I’ve seen her play.” Teammate Cammi Granato told The Boston Globe that Hamlen had “played her heart out. We just didn't put the puck in the net. The chances we had, we didn't bury.”

Hamlen played for the national team again in 2001 though she was not on the roster for that year's World Championship.

== Coaching career ==
Hamlen began her coaching career on July 17, 2000 as an assistant with the University of New Hampshire (UNH). She was promoted to associate head coach on July 27, 2006. She spent a total of 10 seasons at UNH (2000-2010). During her time with the team, the Wildcats won six straight Hockey East regular season championships (2004-2009) and four straight Hockey East tournament championships (2006-2009). Hamlen was part of the coaching staff that led the Wildcats to the Frozen Four in 2006 and 2008. The 2007 team spent time ranked No. 1 in the country, ending the season at No. 4. The 2008 team recorded an undefeated season. As a coach at UNH, Hamlen helped goaltender Jen Huggon earn All-America honors. In each of the first six seasons of the Hockey East women's conference, a UNH goaltender won its goaltending champion award.

Hamlen was an assistant coach for U.S. women's hockey team at the 2006 Four Nations Cup and at the 2007 IIHF World Championship. She was an assistant for the U.S. women's U18 ice hockey team during the 2007–08 season.

The Boston Blades hired Hamlen on September 17, 2010, as the team's first coach. The Blades were the first U.S. team in the now-defunct Canadian Women's Hockey League. Hamlen coached the team for one season.

She coached the University of New England women's ice hockey program during its first season, in 2012–13.

=== Merrimack College ===
On June 24, 2013, she was hired as head coach of the Merrimack Warriors women's ice hockey program in Hockey East. She was the first coach of the Merrimack women's team and compiled a record of 93–239–35 through 11 seasons.

In starting the Merrimack women's program, Hamlen resisted suggestions that she gradually build the program through club hockey or even a Division 3 schedule. “My personality doesn't allow me to ease into anything,” she told an interviewer. “Let's go. Let's just start this (in Hockey East). We will do what we need to do to get the right talent in place. I'm ready to tackle this now.” Hamlen had support from Mark Dennehy, then the coach of the Merrimack men's team, and said she tried to emulate his approach. Dennehy was a member of the search committee for a women's ice hockey coach.

Hamlen spent more than two years at Merrimack recruiting a team before ever playing a game. In the second year, four players were enrolled. Hamlen later recalled, “Even though there weren't any games, we worked them hard.” Hamlen has described early recruiting for Merrimack as difficult, as she competed for players against programs like the Boston College Eagles and Boston University Terriers. She and her assistants initially focused on prospective Division 1 athletes who were “missing a piece” of their game, she said. But the school gradually started “getting attention and respect,” gaining commitments from players who were also being recruited by top schools in the country. Hamlen said she felt her own success, in her college career at UNH and as a member of the U.S. national team, gave her clout as she tried to attract players to Merrimack.

In the team's first season, Hamlen led a squad of 16 freshman, four redshirt freshman and two juniors. The inaugural team won five games, with its first victory coming against Hamlen's alma mater, UNH. In the program's second season, the Warriors increased their goals scored by 50 percent and their points by 60 percent, with more than double the wins, en route to an 11–22—3 finish. The team earned its first-ever berth in the Hockey East tournament.

In September 2017, Hamlen's team started the season with back-to-back upsets on the road over Boston University, 2–1, and No. 3 ranked Minnesota, 4–3. Merrimack beat Minnesota even as the Warriors were outshot, 57–19. Hamlen credited goaltending — by junior Samantha Ridgewell and sophomore Lea Kristine Demers — in both victories. The team finished the 2017–18 season 11–20–3.

Hamlen's most successful season at Merrimack was in 2018–19 — the senior season for her inaugural class of freshman. The Warriors posted the team's first-ever winning record, at 16–13—7, which included a 1–0 victory over No.9-ranked Boston College on December 8. The team earned its second berth in the Hockey East tournament, where they lost to Providence in the opening round.

In the first seven seasons, Hamlen's teams at Merrimack produced six professional players: Dominique Kremer, Mikyla Grant-Mentis, Courtney Maud, Dominika Lásková, Samantha Ridgewell, and Paige Voight. Two players — Dominika Lásková and Kateřina Bukolská — have competed in the Olympics, both for the Czech national team.

On March 5, 2026, Merrimack announced Hamlen would not return as head coach for the following season.

== Personal life ==
Hamlen grew up in Glens Falls, New York, the second of three daughters of Peter and Joan Whitten.

She was inducted into the Adirondack Hockey Hall of Fame in 2017. The induction was held February 25, 2017, prior to an ECHL game between the Adirondack Thunder and the Brampton Beast. She was the first woman inducted into the regional hall of fame, which was created in 2010.

Hamlen has also competed in marathons and triathlons.

She and her husband, Tim, live in Hampton, New Hampshire, with their two children.

== Career statistics ==
Men's professional leagues

			Regular season
Season	Team	League	GP	W	L	T	Min	GA	SO	GAA	SV%
1993-94	Toledo Storm	ECHL	4	2	0	0	149	20	0	8.01	0.737
1993-94	Dallas Freeze	CHL	4	1	1	0	111	9	0	4.85	0.847
1994-95	Utica Blizzard	CoHL	1	0	1	0	19	2	0	6.32	0.667
1995-96	Muskegon Fury	CoHL	4	0	1	0	120	9	0	4.49	0.862
1995-96	Flint Generals	CoHL	4	2	0	0	119	12	0	6.05	0.727

=== International ===
Year	Team	Event	Result	GP	W	L	OT	MIN	SA	GA	GAA	SV%
1992	United States	WW	2nd place, silver medalist(s)	4				228MC_201610149	94	14	3.68	0.851
1994	United States	WW	2nd place, silver medalist(s)	3				180:	52	7	2.33	0.864
1997	United States	WW	2nd place, silver medalist(s)	5	3	1	1	297:	76	6	1.41	0.908
1999	United States	WW	2nd place, silver medalist(s)	3	2	1	0	179:03	72	4	1.34	0.944

Head coaching record

Record table
Season	Team	Overall	Conference	Standing	Postseason
University of New England (NEHC) (2012–2013)
2012–13	U New England	1-10-0	1–4–0	9th	
Merrimack Warriors (Hockey East) (2015–2026)
2015–16	Merrimack	5-26-3	3–18–3	9th	
2016-17	Merrimack	11-22-3	7–17–0	8th	HEA Quarterfinals
2017-18	Merrimack	11-20-3	6-16-2	9th	
2018-19	Merrimack	16-13-7	12-10-5	5th	HEA Quarterfinals
2019-20	Merrimack	5-24-5	2-20-5	10th	
2020–21	Merrimack	1-15-0	1-15-0	10th	
2021–22	Merrimack	8-25-1	6-20-1	9th	HEA Quarterfinals
2022–23	Merrimack	9-25-2	5-20-2	10th	HEA Quarterfinals
2023–24	Merrimack	11-22-3	7-17-3	9th	HEA Quarterfinals
2024–25	Merrimack	9-23-4	5-18-4	10th	HEA Quarterfinals
2025–26	Merrimack	7-24-4	4-18-2	10th	
Merrimack:		93-239-35	59–190–27		
Total:		94-249-35			
National champion Postseason invitational champion Conference regular season champion Conference regular season and conference tournament champion Division regular season champion Division regular season and conference tournament champion Conference tournament champion

== Awards and honors ==
- Bob Allen Women's Player of the Year Award (1994)
- University of New Hampshire's Department of Women's Athletics Athlete of the Year (1993)
- ECAC Goaltender of the Year (1992)
- ECAC All-Star Selection (equivalent to first-team status) 1990, 1991
- ECAC First-Team All-Star (1992, 1993)
- Directorate Award, Best Goaltender, 1994 IIHF Women's World Championship
- UNH Athletics Hall of Fame, Class of 1998
- Adirondack Hockey Hall of Fame, 2017

== See also ==
- Merrimack Warriors women's ice hockey
