= 2022–23 Buffalo Beauts season =

2022–23 Buffalo Beauts
- League: 7 PHF
- 2022–23 record: 4-12-2
- Home record: 2-7-1
- Road record: 2-5-1
- Goals for: 38
- Goals against: 74

Team information
- General manager: Nate Oliver
- Coach: Rhea Coad
- Assistant coach: Julia DiTondo; Jeff State
- Captain: Dominique Kremer
- Alternate captains: Claudia Kepler; Cassidy MacPherson
- Arena: Northtown Center

Team leaders
- Goals: Claudia Kepler (7)
- Assists: Mikyla Grant-Mentis (10)
- Points: Mikyla Grant-Mentis (13)
- Penalty minutes: Summer-Rae Dobson (18)
- Plus/minus: 2 tied at (0)
- Wins: Lovisa Berndtsson (2)
- Goals against average: Kassidy Sauvé (3.33)

The 2022–23 Buffalo Beauts season is the eighth in franchise history. In the off-season, the club signed former league MVP Mikyla Grant-Mentis to the largest single-season contract in league history, valued at US$80,000. Defenseman Dominique Kremer signed the league's first-ever 2-year contract on the opening day of free agency and was named team Captain on September 22. This will mark her first season in the role.

== Offseason ==
- October 26: Cassidy MacPherson and Claudia Kepler were named alternate captains for the Beauts.
- November 5: In the season opener, the Beauts hosted the expansion Montreal Force in their PHF regular season debut. Antonia Matzka scored the first goal of the game, also the first of her career.

== Schedule and results ==
=== Preseason ===
2022–23 preseason game log: (home: 0–0–0; road: 0–2–0)
October: 0–2–0, 0 points (home: 0–0–0; road: 0–2–0)

Game	Date	Opponent	Score	OT	Decision	Location	Record	Points	Recap
1	October 14	@ Metropolitan Riveters	1-5		Sauvé	The Rink at American Dream	0-1-0	0	Beauts lone goal scored by Jenna Suokko
2	October 15	@ Metropolitan Riveters	0-2		Sauvé	The Rink at American Dream	0-2-0	0	Kassidy Sauve named Third Star of the Game

== Regular season ==
=== Standings ===
Pos	Team	Pld	W	OTW	OTL	L	GF	GA	GD	Pts	
1	Boston Pride	24	15	4	1	4	92	52	+40	54	Playoffs
2	Toronto Six	24	15	2	2	5	87	62	+25	51	Playoffs
3	Connecticut Whale	24	13	1	2	8	83	66	+17	43	Playoffs
4	Minnesota Whitecaps	24	10	0	3	11	58	66	−8	33	Playoffs
5	Metropolitan Riveters	24	8	3	0	13	64	79	−15	30	
6	Montreal Force	24	5	3	2	14	56	70	−14	23	
7	Buffalo Beauts	24	5	0	3	16	50	95	−45	18	

Updated to match(es) played on March 5, 2023. Source: PHF (Note: A win in regulation time is awarded 3 points, 2 points are awarded for an overtime/shootout win, 1 point is awarded for an overtime/shootout loss, 0 points are awarded for a regulation loss) (Note: Tiebreaker order is: points, head-to-head record, regulation wins, wins, goal difference)

=== Schedule ===
Regular season schedule: (home: 2–7–1; road: 2–5–1)
November: 1–0–1, 4 points (home: 1–0–1; road: 0–0–0)

Game	Date	Opponent	Score	OT	Decision	Location	Record	Points	Recap
1	November 5	vs. Montreal Force	4–5	SO	Berndtsson	Northtown Center	0–0–1	1	
2	November 6	vs. Montreal Force	3–2		Hofmann	Northtown Center	1–0–1	4	
–	November 19	@ Connecticut Whale							Postponed due to inclement weather; rescheduled for January 17
–	November 20	@ Connecticut Whale							Postponed due to inclement weather; rescheduled for January 18

December: 0–4–0, 0 points (home: 0–4–0; road: 0–0–0)

Game	Date	Opponent	Score	OT	Decision	Location	Record	Points	Recap
3	December 10	vs. Boston Pride	0–3		Sauvé	Northtown Center	1–1–1	4	
4	December 11	vs. Boston Pride	5–7		Sauvé	Northtown Center	1–2–1	4	
5	December 16	vs. Toronto Six	1–2		Sauvé	Northtown Center	1–3–1	4	
6	December 17	vs. Toronto Six	4–6		Berndtsson	Northtown Center	1–4–1	4	

January: 1–6–1, 4 points (home: 1–3–0; road: 0–3–1)

Game	Date	Opponent	Score	OT	Decision	Location	Record	Points	Recap
7	January 7	vs. Minnesota Whitecaps	1–4		Berndtsson	Northtown Center	1–5–1	4	
8	January 8	vs. Minnesota Whitecaps	3–5		Hofmann	Northtown Center	1–6–1	4	
9	January 14	@ Boston Pride	0–8		Berndtsson	Warrior Ice Arena	1–7–1	4	
10	January 15	@ Boston Pride	1–2	OT	Berndtsson	Warrior Ice Arena	1–7–2	5	
11	January 17	@ Connecticut Whale	0–3		Berndtsson	Milford Ice Pavilion	1–8–2	5	Rescheduled from November 19
12	January 18	@ Connecticut Whale	3–7		Hofmann	International Skating Center of Connecticut	1–9–2	5	Rescheduled from November 20
13	January 21	vs. Metropolitan Riveters	4–1		Berndtsson	Northtown Center	2–9–2	8	
14	January 22	vs. Metropolitan Riveters	2–8		Hofmann	Northtown Center	2–10–2	8	

February: 2–2–0, 6 points (home: 0–0–0; road: 2–2–0)

Game	Date	Opponent	Score	OT	Decision	Location	Record	Points	Recap
15	February 4	@ Toronto Six	0–3		Berndtsson	Canlan Ice Sports – York	2–11–2	8	
16	February 5	@ Toronto Six	2–7		Berndtsson	Canlan Ice Sports - York	2–12–2	8	
17	February 18	@ Minnesota Whitecaps	4–2		Berndtsson	Richfield Ice Arena	3–12–2	11	
18	February 19	@ Minnesota Whitecaps	1–0		Ridgewell	Richfield Ice Arena	4–12–2	14	
19	February 25	@ Montreal Force				Pavillon de la jeunesse			
20	February 26	@ Montreal Force				Pavillon de la jeunesse			

March: 0–0–0, 0 points (home: 0–0–0; road: 0–0–0)

Game	Date	Opponent	Score	OT	Decision	Location	Record	Points	Recap
21	March 4	vs. Connecticut Whale				Northtown Center			
22	March 5	vs. Connecticut Whale				Northtown Center			
23	March 10	@ Metropolitan Riveters				The Rink at American Dream			
24	March 11	@ Metropolitan Riveters				The Rink at American Dream			

Regulation Win (3 points) Overtime/Shootout win (2 points) Overtime/shootout loss (1 point) Regulation Loss (0 points)

== Statistics ==
=== Skaters ===
Regular season
Player	GP	G	A	Pts	+/−	PIM
Claudia Kepler	4	1	3	4	0	0
Antonia Matzka	4	3	0	3	-2	2
Mikyla Grant-Mentis	4	0	3	3	0	2

== Roster ==
=== Current roster ===
As of November 5, 2022

No.	Nat	Player	Pos	S/G	Age	Acquired	Birthplace
14	(United States)	Allison Attea	D	L	27	2021	Buffalo, New York
88	(Sweden)	Lovisa Berndtsson	G	L	37	2021	Stockholm, Sweden
61	(United States)	Michaela Boyle	F	–	27	2022	Reading, Massachusetts
24	(United States)	Anjelica Diffendal	F	R	27	2021	Pittsburgh, Pennsylvania
67	(Canada)	Summer-Rae Dobson	F	R	27	2022	Huntsville, Ontario
77	(Canada)	Whitney Dove	D	R	28	2020	Port Moody, British Columbia
2	(Canada)	Samantha Fieseler	D	L	30	2021	Kelowna, British Columbia
59	(Canada)	Mikyla Grant-Mentis	F	L	28	2022	Brampton, Ontario
47	(Canada)	Jessica Healey	D	L	29	2022	Edmonton, Alberta
31	(Canada)	Tera Hofmann (PTO)	G	L	28	2022	Toronto, Ontario
34	(United States)	Claudia Kepler (A)	F	R	31	2021	Verona, Wisconsin
94	(United States)	Grace Klienbach	F	R	32	2021	Eustis, Florida
13	(United States)	Dominique Kremer (C)	D	R	29	2020	Hudson, Iowa
9	(Canada)	Autumn MacDougall	F	L	28–29	2020	Dartmouth, Nova Scotia
17	(Canada)	Cassidy MacPherson (A)	F	L	29	2019	Oakville, Ontario
23	(Austria)	Antonia Matzka	D	L	27	2022	Mödling, Austria
42	(Canada)	Courtney Maud	F	L	27	2022	Georgetown, Ontario
11	(United States)	Madi Nichols	F	L	26	2022	Trinity, Florida
16	(Finland)	Emma Nuutinen	F	L	29	2022	Vantaa, Finland
32	(Canada)	Kassidy Sauvé	G	L	30	2022	Whitby, Ontario
44	(Finland)	Jenna Suokko	F	L	31	2021	Tampere, Finland
10	(United States)	Madison Truax	D	R	28	2022	Gardner, Massachusetts

Coaching staff and team personnel

- Head coach: Rhea Coad
- Assistant coach: Julia DiTondo
- Assistant coach: Mark Zarbo
- Goaltending coach: Shane Madolora
- Video & analytics: Chris Baudo

== Transactions ==
=== Signings ===
Player	Date	Contract terms
Dominique Kremer	May 3, 2022	2-year contract The first-ever two-year deal in league history.
Mikyla Grant-Mentis	May 9, 2022	1-year contract $80,000 (USD); 10% of the contract is a signing bonus
Emma Nuutinen	June 1, 2022	1-year contract
Madi Nichols	June 16, 2022	1-year contract
Kassidy Sauvé	June 22, 2022	1-year contract
Michaela Boyle	June 22, 2022	1-year contract
Summer-Rae Dobson	July 20, 2022	2-year contract
Maddie Truax	August 5, 2022	1-year contract
