= Lindsay Grigg =

Canadian inline hockey and ice hockey player

Personal information
- Born: May 26, 1993 (age 33) North York, Ontario, Canada
- Home town: Oakville, Ontario, Canada
- Education: Rochester Institute of Technology
- Years active: 2010–present
- Height: 5 ft (1.5 m)

Sport
- Country: Canada
- Sport: Inline hockey
- Position: Defence
- Shoots: Right
Ice hockey career
- Position: Defence/Forward
- Shot: Right
- Played for: Buffalo Beauts; HV71; Markham Thunder
- Playing career: 2011–2018
Medal record
Representing Canada
Women's inline hockey
World Championship
Gold medal – first place	2012 Colombia
Gold medal – first place	2016 Italy
Silver medal – second place	2011 Italy
Silver medal – second place	2014 France
Bronze medal – third place	2017 China

Lindsay Grigg (born May 26, 1993) is a Canadian inline hockey and ice hockey player and a member of the Canadian national inline hockey team.

== Ice hockey ==
=== Playing career ===
During the 2010–11 season of the Provincial Women's Hockey League, Grigg played for the Oakville Jr. Hornets and served as team captain.

==== NCAA ====
Grigg played college ice hockey with the RIT Tigers women's ice hockey program from 2011 to 2015. The RIT Tigers competed in the ECAC West conference of NCAA Division III women's ice hockey during Grigg's freshman season (2011–12) before moving up to the College Hockey America (CHA) conference of the NCAA Division I ahead of the 2012–13 season. A defencively-minded skater, Grigg flexed between playing as a defenceman and as a forward forward throughout her four seasons with RIT.

During the 2011–12 season, Grigg contributed to the Tigers' record-setting 28–1–1 win-loss record while primarily playing on the top defensive pairing. In the semifinals of the 2012 NCAA Division III women's ice hockey tournament against the Plattsburgh State Cardinals, she scored the game winning goal in overtime to send the Tigers to the national championship game.

She was co-captain of the team as a junior and senior, sharing the role with future RIT Tigers head coach Celeste Brown during both seasons.

Grigg scored the game-winning goal of the 2014 CHA championship to secure the RIT Tigers' first conference championship title in NCAA Division I play. Her goal came with 6:17 remaining in second overtime versus the Mercyhurst Lakers and earned a 2–1 victory for the Tigers.

==== Elite leagues ====
On July 13, 2015, Grigg signed a professional contract with the Buffalo Beauts for the inaugural season of the National Women's Hockey League (NWHL).

For the 2016–17 season, Grigg signed with HV71 in the Swedish Women's Hockey League (SDHL).

=== Career statistics ===
			Regular season					Playoffs
Season	Team	League	GP	G	A	Pts	PIM	GP	G	A	Pts	PIM
2010–11	Oakville Hornets	Prov. WHL	36	10	6	16	30	3	0	0	0	2
2011–12	RIT Tigers	ECAC West	30	8	14	22	8	—	—	—	—	—
2012–13	RIT Tigers	CHA	36	2	12	14	10	—	—	—	—	—
2013–14	RIT Tigers	CHA	38	3	18	21	12	—	—	—	—	—
2014–15	RIT Tigers	CHA	39	7	11	18	14	—	—	—	—	—
2015–16	Buffalo Beauts	NWHL	15	0	2	2	6	5	0	1	1	6
2016–17	HV71	SDHL	33	8	10	18	8	6	0	1	1	0
2017–18	Markham Thunder	CWHL	28	0	5	5	6	3	0	0	0	0
NCAA D1 totals			113	12	41	53	36	–	–	–	–	–

=== Awards and honours ===
Award	Year
CWHL
Clarkson Cup Champion	2018
SDHL
Swedish Championship Silver Medal	2017
RIT Tigers
All-CHA Second Team	2013–14
CHA Championship All-Tournament Team	2014
CHA Championship All-Tournament Team	2015
CHA Player of the Week	Week of March 10, 2014
CHA Player of the Week	Week of March 2, 2015
CHA Best Defensive Forward	2014–15
CHA All-Academic	2014–15

== Inline hockey ==
Grigg began playing inline hockey at age 10.

Grigg joined the Canadian women's senior inline hockey team in 2012, capturing a gold medal at the World Championships. With Canada's inline team, she was their scoring leader at the 2016 FIRS World Inline Hockey Championships in Asiago, logging ten points. Of note, she ranked fifth overall among all female competitors

In addition, Grigg served as an assistant coach for the Canadian women's national under-19 inline hockey team that competed in the junior women's tournament at the 2014 FIRS World Inline Hockey Championships in Toulouse, France.
