= RIT Tigers ice hockey =

The RIT Tigers ice hockey program consists of two ice hockey teams that represent Rochester Institute of Technology:

- RIT Tigers men's ice hockey
- RIT Tigers women's ice hockey
