= 2018 NWHL Draft =

General information
- Dates: December 19 & 20, 2018

Overview
- League: National Women's Hockey League
- First selection: Annie Pankowski, Metropolitan Riveters

The 2018 NWHL Draft took place on the December 19 and 20, 2018, the first and only draft in NWHL history to happen while the season was underwear . The expansion Minnesota Whitecaps would take part in the draft for the first time.

The 2018 draft was the first draft in NWHL history not to see a goaltender selected in the first two rounds, and the first to see an NCAA Division III player selected.

== Format ==
There was five rounds, with each team having one pick in each and having 90 seconds to make that pick. Draft order was decided using each team's winning percentage in the first half of the season, with goal difference being the tiebreaker. The final draft order was:

1. Metropolitan Riveters
2. Connecticut Whale
3. Buffalo Beauts
4. Minnesota Whitecaps
5. Boston Pride

Players who were drafted were not guaranteed to sign with the team that drafted them.

== Results ==
Rd	P	Player	Team	Nationality	Former team
1	1	Annie Pankowski	Metropolitan Riveters	United States	University of Wisconsin–Madison
1	2	Melissa Samoskevich	Connecticut Whale	United States	Quinnipiac University
1	3	Megan Keller	Buffalo Beauts	United States	Boston College
1	4	Kelly Pannek	Minnesota Whitecaps	United States	University of Minnesota
1	5	Kali Flanagan	Boston Pride	United States	Boston College
2	6	Kendall Cornine	Metropolitan Riveters	United States	Rochester Institute of Technology
2	7	Makenna Newkirk	Connecticut Whale	United States	Boston College
2	8	Loren Gabel	Buffalo Beauts	Canada	Clarkson University
2	9	Sophia Shaver	Minnesota Whitecaps	United States	University of Wisconsin–Madison
2	10	Bailey Larson	Boston Pride	United States	Colgate University
3	11	Courtney Wittig	Metropolitan Riveters	United States	University of Wisconsin–Eau Claire
3	12	Katelyn Rae	Connecticut Whale	Canada	Merrimack College
3	13	Jessie Eldridge	Buffalo Beauts	Canada	Colgate University
3	14	Lauren Boyle	Minnesota Whitecaps	United States	Ohio State University
3	15	Emily Clark	Boston Pride	Canada	University of Wisconsin–Madison
4	16	Paige Voight	Metropolitan Riveters	United States	Merrimack College
4	17	Dominique Kremer	Connecticut Whale	United States	Merrimack College
4	18	Olivia Zafuto	Buffalo Beauts	United States	Colgate University
4	19	Grace Bizal	Minnesota Whitecaps	United States	Boston College
4	20	Lovisa Selander	Boston Pride	Sweden	Rensselaer Polytechnic Institute
5	21	Cailey Hutchison	Metropolitan Riveters	United States	University of Maine
5	22	Maggie LaGue	Connecticut Whale	United States	Robert Morris University
5	23	Nicole Schammel	Buffalo Beauts	United States	University of Minnesota
5	24	Karlie Lund	Minnesota Whitecaps	United States	Princeton University
5	25	Jenna Rheault	Boston Pride	United States	University of New Hampshire
