= Celeste Brown =

Celeste Brown may refer to:

- Celeste Brown (ice hockey) (born 1992), American ice hockey player
- Celeste Brown (swimmer) (born 1994), Cook Islands swimmer
