= Kali Flanagan =

American ice hockey player and coach

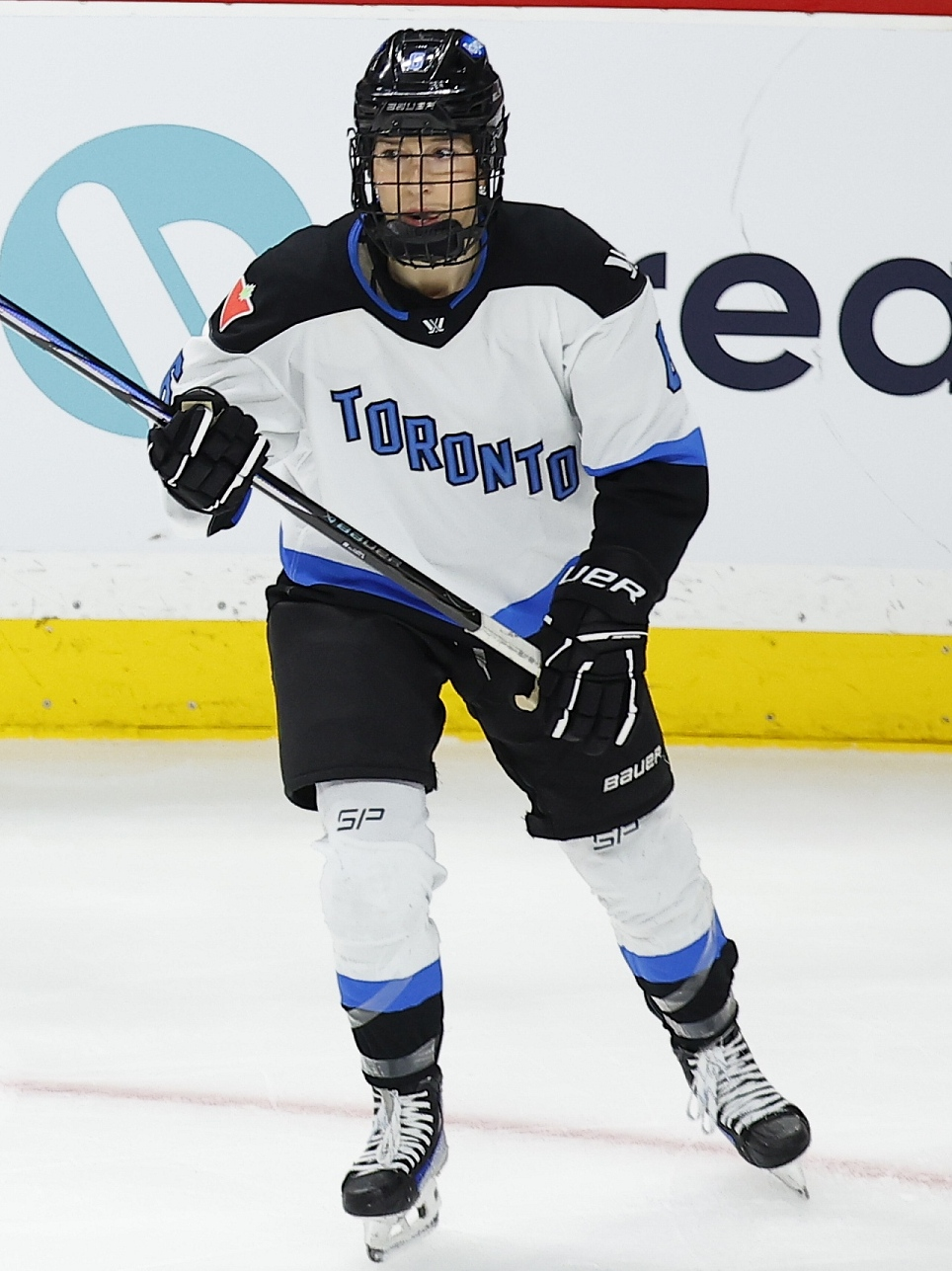
- Flanagan with PWHL Toronto in 2024
- Born: September 19, 1995 (age 31) Burlington, Massachusetts, U.S.
- Height: 5 ft 5 in (165 cm)
- Weight: 141 lb (64 kg; 10 st 1 lb)
- Position: Defence
- Shoots: Right
- PWHL team Former teams: Toronto Sceptres: Team WSF; Boston Pride
- National team: United States
- Playing career: 2014–present
Medal record
Women's ice hockey
Representing United States
Olympic Games
Gold medal – first place	2018 PyeongChang
World Championships
Gold medal – first place	2017 United States

Kali Dora Flanagan (born September 19, 1995) is an American ice hockey forward for the Toronto Sceptres of the Professional Women's Hockey League (PWHL) and a former member of the United States women's national ice hockey team. She also served as an assistant coach for the Northern Cyclones, the first female coach in USPHL history.

== Playing career ==
=== Early Career ===
Flanagan was born on September 19, 1995, in Burlington, Massachusetts to Bill Flanagan and Anita Gagne Crowley. Bill played ice hockey for RPI before turning to coaching while her cousin Baye Flanagan played for Merrimack College. She has one sister, Kristine (Krissy).

Flanagan originally learned to skate as a figure skater. At six years old, she made the switch to hockey when she decided to follow in the footsteps of her father Bill, who played college ice hockey for the RPI Engineers.

Flanagan grew up playing on boys' teams with the Northern Cyclones organization for most of her childhood until she was 14. As an 8th grader, she played on her first all-girls team when she pushed up to join the Varsity High School team. She attended three years of high school at the National Sports Academy, in Lake Placid, New York and was named captain for two years. During her junior year, she was invited to the U.S U18 Women's National Team. For her senior year, she returned home to Burlington, playing for the Burlington High School team. Following high school, Flanagan accepted a full-scholarship to Boston College.

=== College ===
Flanagan made her debut with the Boston College Eagles during the 2014–15 season. She played in all 39 games with three goals and six assists for nine points. Flanagan scored her first goal with the Eagles against the Crusaders.

In her 2015–16 sophomore season, the Eagles went undefeated finishing the regular season 34–0–0 setting a program record with 14 shutouts, passing the old mark of 12. The Eagles went on to win the Hockey East Champions and The Beanpot with a 5–0 victory over Boston University that year. In the Frozen Four, the Eagles beat the sixth ranked Huskies in the quarter-finals and the fifth ranked Golden Knights in the semi-final, before losing 1–3 to the second ranked Golden Gophers in the final. Flanagan finished the season playing in all 41 games with a career best six goals and 18 assists for 24 points, with a plus 38 rating.

In her junior year, Flanagan scored five goals and 14 assists, totaling 19 points and finished the season as the team's second-highest scoring defenseman. She blocked a team-high 66 shots logging significant minutes during the second half of the season as injuries plagued the defense. She started the season with a three-game point streak collecting an assist in each of the first three games. Flanagan later set a career high four-game point streak collecting three goals in three consecutive games, followed by an assist in the fourth. She scored the tying goal in the second period of the championship game against the Huskies. The 2016–17 Eagles repeated as the Hockey East Champions after Andie Anastos scored the overtime goal.

Flanagan took a redshirt for the 2017–18 Junior year after being named to the U.S. roster for the 2018 Winter Olympics.

Returning for her senior year, Flanagan was named co-captain of the Eagles alongside Megan Keller, and Makenna Newkirk as voted on by the team. She played in 38 of 39 games for the Eagles, missing one game as she was named to the U.S. Women's National Team Roster for the 2018 4 Nations Cup. In the Hockey East Championship game, Flanagan tied the game at 2–2 with 4 seconds left in the third period, sending the game to overtime. However, the Eagles would end up losing to the Huskies in overtime.

=== Professional ===
==== PWHPA ====
She was drafted 5th overall by the Boston Pride in the 2018 NWHL Draft, as the last selection of the first round.

However, with the collapse of the CWHL in the spring of 2019, Flanagan announced, as part of a joint statement on May 2, 2019, her intent to boycott any professional league in North America for the 2019–20 season. On May 20, Flanagan announced that she had joined newly formed the PWHPA, a non-profit organization to advance the mission of a unified, financially sustainable professional league.

During the 2019–20 PWHPA season, she captained one of four teams in the second series of showcases in Hudson, New Hampshire. The team was coached by her father Bill, and Flanagan was reunited with Eagles alumni Katie Burt, Keller, Newkirk, Amanda Pelkey. Flanagan scored one goal but the team finished the tournament 0–2 losing to Team Stecklein and Team Lamoureux.

Flanagan was named as one of the PWHPA players who took part in the 2020 ECHL All-Star Game, where she picked up a goal and an assist.

Flanagan was named to Team WSF for the 2020–21 PWHPA season.

==== PHF ====
After not being named to the final roster for the 2022 Olympic Team Flanagan signed with the Pride of the Premier Hockey Federation on December 2, 2021 for the 2021–22 season. She was named to the 2022 All-Star Classic in Toronto. The Pride went on to win their second consecutive Isobel Cup, defeating the Connecticut Whale 4–2 on March 29, 2022.

On July 25, 2022, the Pride announced they had extended Flanagan on a two-year contract.

Flanagan won the PHF Defender of the Year for the 2022–23 regular season. She finished the regular season tied for third in scoring among defenders with 16 points, with three goals and 13 assists in 21 games.

Following the 2022–23 season, Flanagan signed another two-year extension through the 2024–25 season.

==== PWHL ====
Following the formation of the PWHL, Flanagan was drafted in the sixth round, 35th overall, by PWHL Toronto in the 2023 PWHL draft. She signed a two-year contract on November 10, 2023. She scored her first goal on February 14, 2024 against Emma Soderberg of the PWHL Boston. Flanagan was named the third star of the week after a two-point game to extend Toronto's winning streak to 10 games.

During the 2024–25 season, she recorded three goals and four assists in 30 games. On June 19, 2025, she signed a one-year contract extension with the Toronto Sceptres.

During Phase 2 of the 2026 PWHL Expansion Player Distribution Process, Flanagan rejected a Foundation Player Offer from one of the four expansion teams. The Sceptres used the first of their protection spots in Phase 3, fourth overall, by re-signing Flanagan to a three-year contract on June 11, 2026.

== International play ==
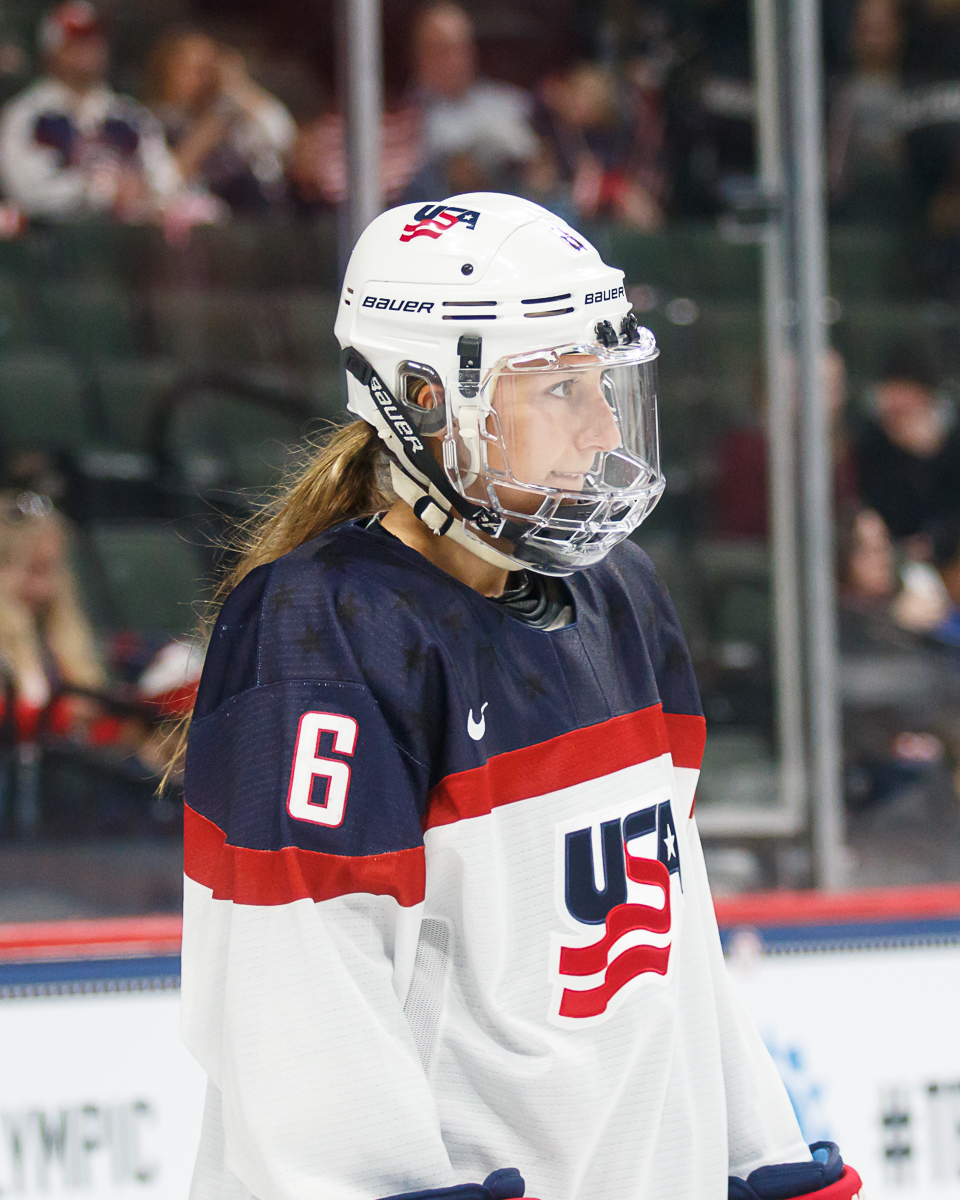
Flanagan with Team USA in 2017

After her first semester with the Eagles, Flanagan was invited to a national team training camp where she made the 2015 and 2016 U.S U22 Women's National Team camp. During her time in Florida, she ended up as roommates with Cayla Barnes, and both were named as first-time Olympians.

She participated at the 2017 IIHF Women's World Championship and at the 2018 Winter Olympics.

Following the announcement of the Team USA roster, players relocated to the Tampa area. The team trained out of the Florida Hospital Center in preparation for the 2018 Olympic Winter Games in Pyeongchang.

During the 2018 Olympics, Flanagan helped Team USA win their first gold medal since 1998 in a shootout win over Team Canada. She competed for Team Americas at the 2019 Aurora Games.

== Personal life ==
She graduated from Boston College in May 2019 with a major in Psychology.

Flanagan has been running the Kali Flanagan Elite Edge Hockey Camp since 2024.

She is in a relationship with her Toronto Sceptres teammate Allie Munroe who she owns a dog, Duncan, with. The couple announced their engagement on July 2nd.

== Career statistics ==
=== Regular season and playoffs ===
			Regular season					Playoffs
Season	Team	League	GP	G	A	Pts	PIM	GP	G	A	Pts	PIM
2010–11	National Sports Academy	JWHL	21	1	2	3	10	—	—	—	—	—
2011–12	National Sports Academy	JWHL	31	2	12	14	16	—	—	—	—	—
2012–13	National Sports Academy	JWHL	30	8	22	30	6	—	—	—	—	—
2013–14	Boston Shamrocks	JWHL	5	1	0	1	0	—	—	—	—	—
2014–15	Boston College	HE	39	3	6	9	2	—	—	—	—	—
2015–16	Boston College	HE	41	6	18	24	12	—	—	—	—	—
2016–17	Boston College	HE	39	5	14	19	4	—	—	—	—	—
2018–19	Boston College	HE	38	5	15	20	4	—	—	—	—	—
2020–21	Team WSF	PWHPA	6	0	1	1	4	—	—	—	—	—
2021–22	Boston Pride	PHF	14	0	4	4	6	3	2	3	5	2
2022–23	Boston Pride	PHF	21	3	13	16	6	2	0	0	0	2
2023–24	PWHL Toronto	PWHL	24	3	3	6	2	5	0	1	1	2
2024–25	Toronto Sceptres	PWHL	30	3	4	7	6	4	1	2	3	0
2025–26	Toronto Sceptres	PWHL	30	2	5	7	4	—	—	—	—	—
PWHL totals			84	8	12	20	12	9	1	3	4	2

=== International ===
Year	Team	Event	Result	GP	G	A	Pts	PIM
2017	United States	WC	1st place, gold medalist(s)	5	0	0	0	0
2018	United States	OG	1st place, gold medalist(s)	5	0	0	0	0
Senior totals				10	0	0	0	0

== Awards and honours ==
Award	Year(s)	Ref.
Hockey East
Hockey East Third-Team All Stars	2019	
PHF
Isobel Cup	2022	
PHF Defender of the Year	2023	
