= Kendall Cornine =

American ice hockey forward

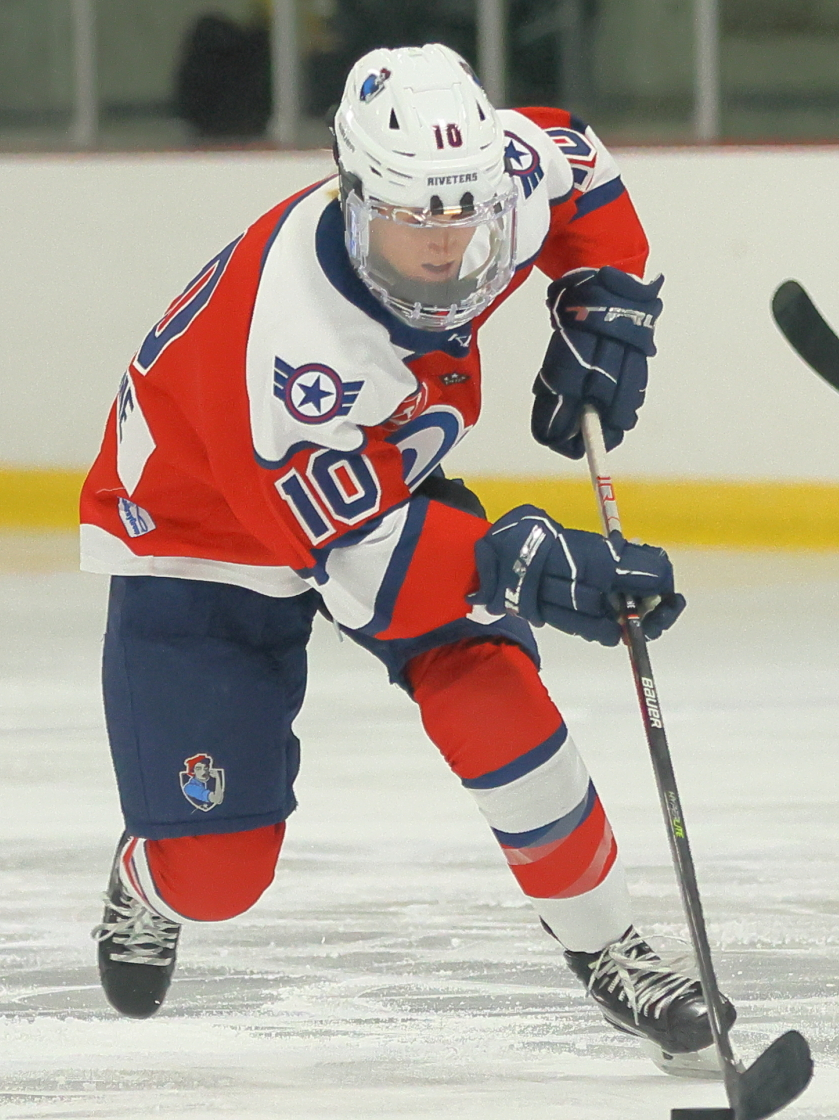
- Cornine with the Metropolitan Riveters in 2022
- Born: December 17, 1996 (age 29) Livingston, New Jersey, U.S.
- Height: 5 ft 5 in (165 cm)
- Position: Forward
- Shoots: Right
- PHF team Former teams: Metropolitan Riveters; RIT Tigers
- Playing career: 2015–present

Kendall Cornine (born December 17, 1996) is an American ice hockey forward who played in the now defunct Premier Hockey Federation (PHF) with the Metropolitan Riveters.

== Playing career ==
Cornine graduated from Morristown–Beard School, a private secondary school in Morris County, New Jersey, where she set the school's career scoring record with 199 points (104 goals + 95 assists) in just 74 games. As a senior, she also played with the East Coast Wizards U19 team of the Eastern Women's Hockey Conference (EWHC). She was named the New Jersey Devils High School Player of the Year twice, in 2014 and 2015, and was the 2015 New Jersey Girls High School Player of the Year.

In 2015, Cornine joined the RIT Tigers women's ice hockey program in the College Hockey America (CHA) conference of the NCAA Division I. She went on to set the team career scoring record at the NCAA Division I level with 64 points (34+26) across 140 games and served as Rochester captain in her final two seasons.

Cornine was drafted in the second round, 6th overall in the 2018 NWHL Draft by the Metropolitan Riveters, the first player from the Rochester Institute of Technology (RIT) in history to be drafted into the NWHL. She scored 24 points in 24 games in her rookie professional season, finishing tied for second on the Riveters in goals, being named to the 2020 NWHL All-Star Game, and picking up the nickname "Score-nine."

She re-signed with the Riveters in March 2020, becoming the first player in the league to re-sign for the 2020–21 NWHL season.

== Career statistics ==
			Regular season					Playoffs
Season	Team	League	GP	G	A	Pts	PIM	GP	G	A	Pts	PIM
2015–16	RIT Tigers	NCAA	36	4	5	9	12	–	–	–	–	–
2016–17	RIT Tigers	NCAA	34	12	8	20	30	–	–	–	–	–
2017–18	RIT Tigers	NCAA	35	11	5	16	36	–	–	–	–	–
2018–19	RIT Tigers	NCAA	35	11	8	19	24	–	–	–	–	–
2019–20	Metropolitan Riveters	NWHL	24	13	11	24	22	1	0	0	0	0
NCAA totals			140	38	26	64	106	–	–	–	–	–
