= Maggie LaGue =

American ice hockey defender

- Born: 1997 (age 28–29) Barre, Vermont, United States
- Height: 173 cm (5 ft 8 in)
- Position: Defender
- Shot: Right
- PHF team: Connecticut Whale
- Played for: PWHPA; Robert Morris University
- Playing career: 2019–2021

Maggie LaGue is a former American ice hockey defender who played with the Connecticut Whale in the Premier Hockey Federation (PHF).

== Career ==
Across 141 games with Robert Morris University, LaGue scored 92 points, the university all-time record for points by a defender. She would serve as team captain in her final season, winning the CHA Individual Sportsmanship Award.

She was drafted 22nd overall by the Connecticut Whale in the 2018 NWHL Draft, the second player in Robert Morris history to be drafted. She would spend the 2019–20 season with the PWHPA, before signing with the Whale in May 2020.

== Career statistics ==
			Regular season					Playoffs
Season	Team	League	GP	G	A	Pts	PIM	GP	G	A	Pts	PIM
2019-20	Independent	PWHPA	-	-	-	-	-	-	-	-	-	-
2020-21	Connecticut Whale	PHF
PHF totals			-	-	-	-	-	-	-	-	-	-
