= Bob Allen Women's Player of the Year Award =

USA Hockey award for the outstanding women's ice hockey player

- Sport: Ice hockey
- Awarded for: Outstanding American women’s ice hockey player.

History
- First award: 1994
- First winner: Erin Whitten-Hamlen
- Most wins: Hilary Knight (3)
- Most recent: Hilary Knight

The Bob Allen Women's Player of the Year Award is given annually by USA Hockey to an outstanding American-born female ice hockey player. It was first presented in 1994.

== History ==
In 2007, the name of the award was changed to honor the late Bob Allen, who was president of the New York State Amateur Hockey Association from 1954 to 1979 and served in high-ranking positions at USA Hockey from 1974 to 1999, including chairman of the women's national team for its gold medal victory at the 1998 Winter Olympics. Considered the godfather of American women's hockey, he played a major role in the development of girls' and women's hockey in the United States.

== Award winners ==
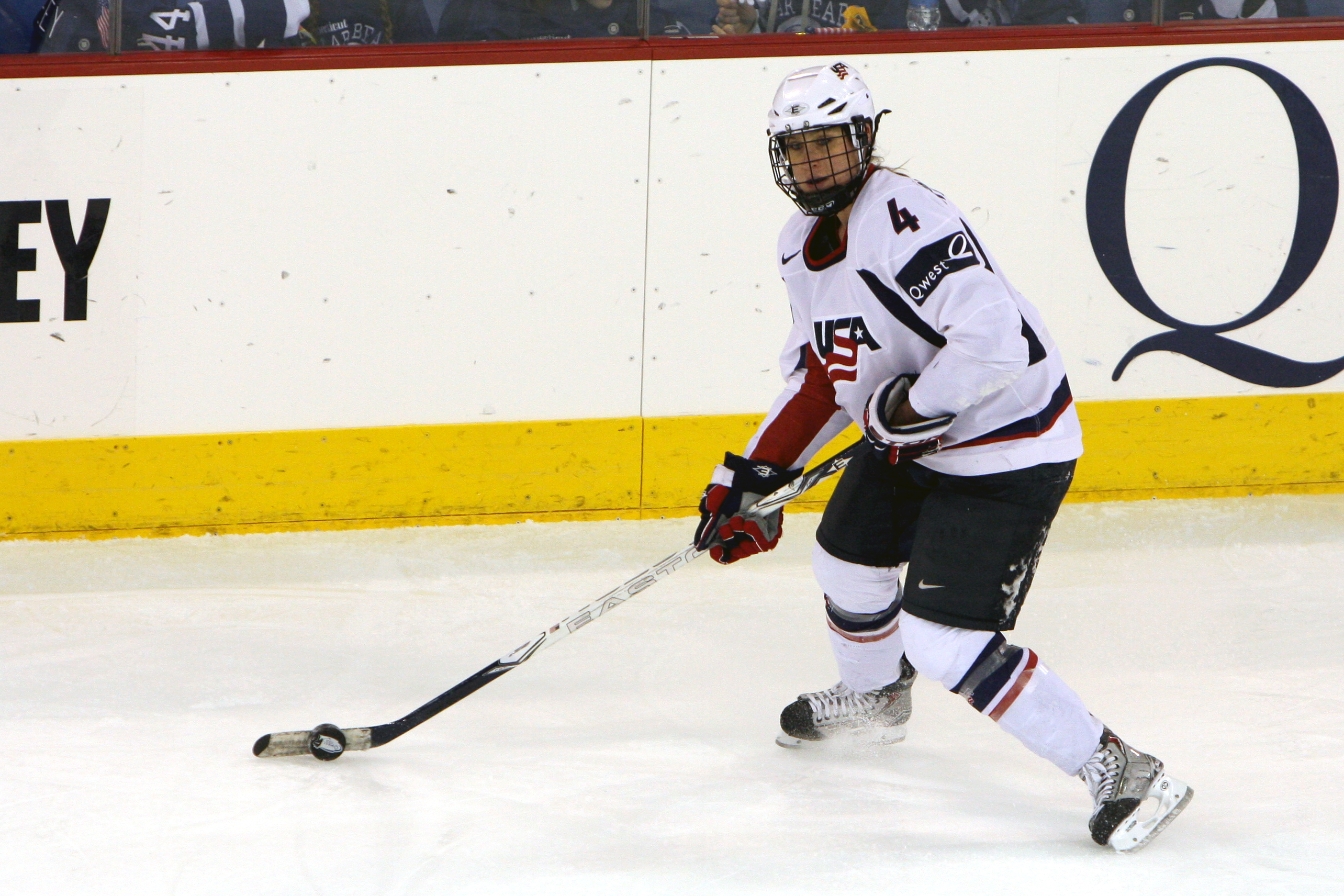
Angela Ruggiero was the first defenseman to win the award, and the first player to win in consecutive years.

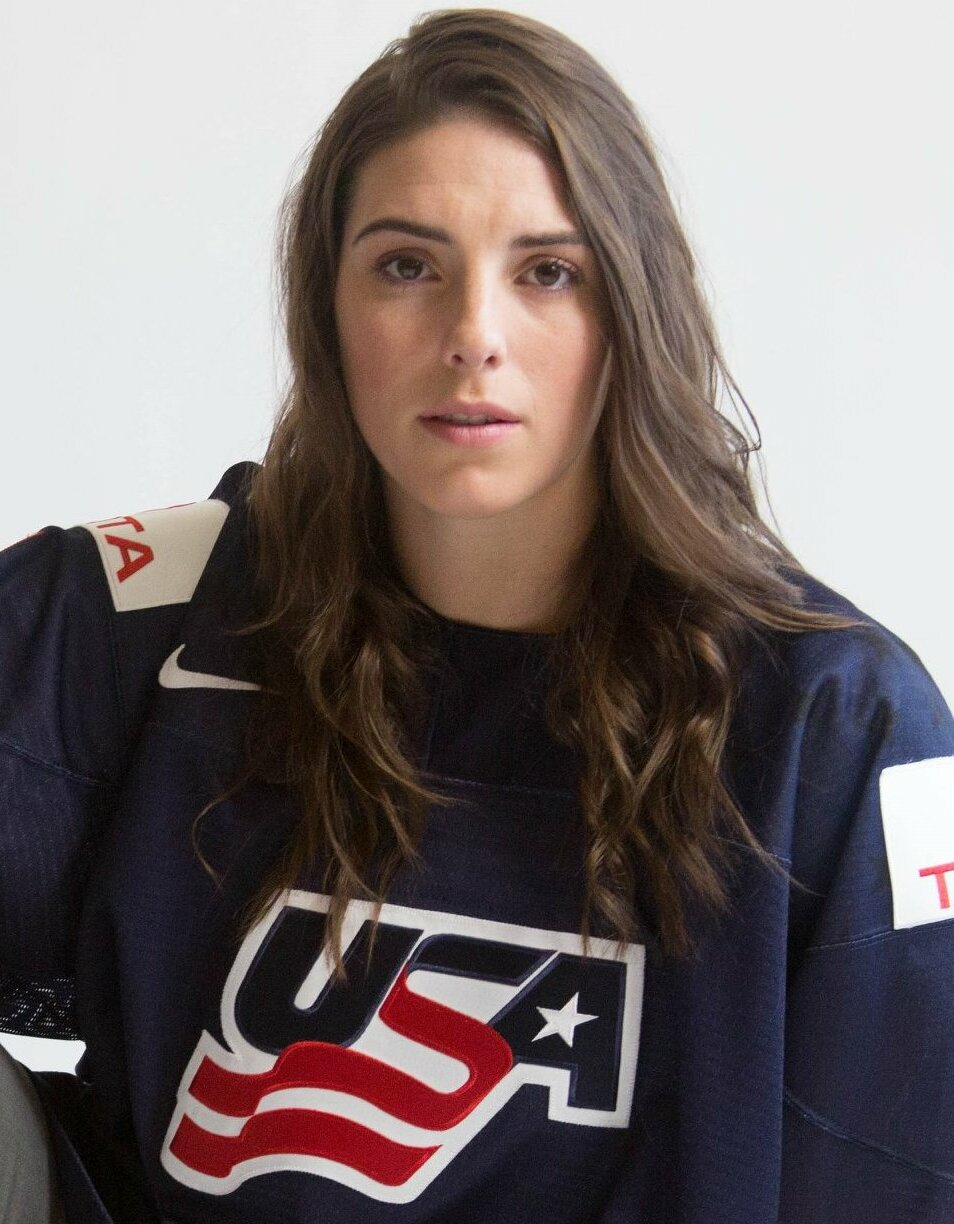
Hilary Knight is the only three-time recipient of the award. As of 2024, she is one of six University of Wisconsin alumni to win the award.

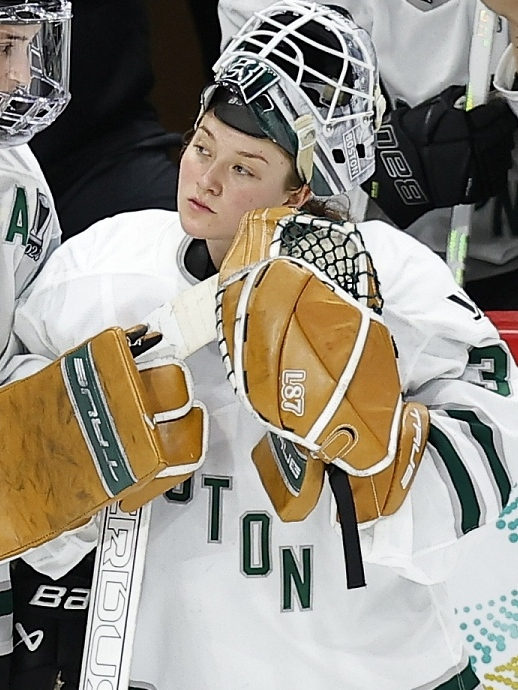
Goaltender Aerin Frankel won the award in 2021.

Year	Winner	Position	Hometown
1994	Erin Whitten-Hamlen	Goaltender	Glens Falls, New York
1995	Karyn Bye	Forward	River Falls, Wisconsin
1996	Cammi Granato	Forward	Downers Grove, Illinois
1997	Laurie Baker	Forward	Concord, Massachusetts
1998	Karyn Bye	Forward	River Falls, Wisconsin
1999	A.J. Mleczko	Forward	Nantucket, Massachusetts
2000	Sara DeCosta-Hayes	Goaltender	Warwick, Rhode Island
2001	Krissy Wendell	Forward	Brooklyn Park, Minnesota
2002	Sara DeCosta-Hayes	Goaltender	Warwick, Rhode Island
2003	Angela Ruggiero	Defenseman	Harper Woods, Michigan
2004	Angela Ruggiero	Defenseman	Harper Woods, Michigan
2005	Natalie Darwitz	Forward	Eagan, Minnesota
2006	Katie King	Forward	Brookline, Massachusetts
2007	Julie Chu	Forward	Fairfield, Connecticut
2008	Caitlin Cahow	Defenseman	Branford, Connecticut
2009	Jessie Vetter	Goaltender	Cottage Grove, Wisconsin
2010	Jenny Potter	Forward	Anoka, Minnesota
2011	Meghan Duggan	Forward	Danvers, Massachusetts
2012	Kelli Stack	Forward	Brooklyn Heights, Ohio
2013	Amanda Kessel	Forward	Madison, Wisconsin
2014	Hilary Knight	Forward	Sun Valley, Idaho
2015	Brianna Decker	Forward	Dousman, Wisconsin
2016	Monique Lamoureux-Morando	Defenseman	Grand Forks, North Dakota
2017	Brianna Decker	Forward	Dousman, Wisconsin
2018	Maddie Rooney	Goaltender	Andover, Minnesota
2019	Kendall Coyne Schofield	Forward	Palos Heights, Illinois
2020	Abby Roque	Forward	Sault Ste. Marie, Michigan
2021	Aerin Frankel	Goaltender	Chappaqua, New York
2022	Hilary Knight	Forward	Sun Valley, Idaho
2023	Caroline Harvey	Defenseman	Salem, New Hampshire
2024	Laila Edwards	Forward	Cleveland, Ohio
2025	Hilary Knight	Forward	Sun Valley, Idaho

Source: USA Hockey

=== Wins by position ===
Position	Wins
Forward	21
Defenseman	5
Goaltender	6

=== Wins by state ===
State	Wins
Wisconsin	6
Massachusetts	4
Minnesota	4
Michigan	3
Connecticut	2
Idaho	3
Illinois	2
New York	2
Ohio	2
Rhode Island	2
New Hampshire	1
North Dakota	1

== See also ==
- List of sports awards honoring women
