= Sarah Coe =

Canadian ice hockey player (born 2003)

- Born: February 4, 2003 (age 23) Ajax, Ontario, Canada
- Height: 5 ft 8 in (173 cm)
- Position: Goaltender
- Catches: Left
- PWHL team: Ottawa Charge
- Playing career: 2021–present

Sarah Coe (born February 4, 2003) is a Canadian professional ice hockey goaltender for the Ottawa Charge of the Professional Women's Hockey League (PWHL). She played college ice hockey at RIT.

== Early life ==
Coe was born to Gary and Carol Coe, and has one sibling, Ryan. She attended Brooklin High School in Brooklin, Ontario.

== Playing career ==
=== College ===
Coe began her collegiate career for RIT during the 2021–22 season. During her freshman year, she set a single-season record for most minutes in a season (1,412), saves (879), and games played (28). Following the season she was named to the CHA All-Rookie team. During the 2022–23 season in her sophomore year, she recorded a 3.15 goals against average (GAA) and a .911 save percentage. She finished the season ranked second in the CHA averaging 29.36 saves per game, third in save percentage and fourth in GAA. Following the season she was named to the CHA All-Second team.

During the 2023–24 season in her junior year, she appeared in 15 games, and posted a 3.07 GAA and a .906 save percentage. During the 2024–25 season in her senior year, she appeared in 26 games, and posted an 11–13–2 record. She recorded career-highs in wins (11), minutes (1,550), GAA (2.32) and save percentage (.923). During October 2024, she posted a 4–1–0 record, including two shutouts. She ranked second in the league with a 1.93 GAA and third with a .926 save percentage. She was subsequently named the AHA Goaltender of the Month. She finished her collegiate career ranked second in program history in games played (93) and minutes played (5,273).

=== Professional ===
Prior to the 2025–26 season, Coe was invited to the Toronto Sceptres' training camp. She was released by the Sceptres on November 18, 2025. On January 6, 2026, she signed a standard player agreement with the Ottawa Charge, after Sanni Ahola was placed on the long-term injured reserve list but was subsequently released on January 9, 2026 when Ahola returned.
