= RIT Tigers women's ice hockey =

- Current season
- University: Rochester Institute of Technology
- Conference: AHA
- Head coach: Celeste Brown; 7th season, 20–87–9
- Arena: Gene Polisseni Center; Henrietta, New York
- Student section: RIT Corner Crew
- Colors: Orange, white, and black

NCAA tournament champions
- Division III: 2012

NCAA tournament Frozen Four
- Division III: 2011, 2012

NCAA tournament appearances
- Division III: 2007, 2011, 2012; Division I: 2015

Conference tournament champions
- ECAC West: 2011, 2012; CHA: 2014, 2015

Conference regular season champions
- ECAC West: 2011, 2012

The RIT Tigers women's ice hockey is the team that is one of two college ice hockey teams representing Rochester Institute of Technology (RIT) in the Atlantic Hockey America (AHA) conference of NCAA Division I. The team plays in suburban Rochester, New York at the Gene Polisseni Center. RIT alumna and former Tigers captain Celeste Brown has served as the Bruce B. Bates Women's Hockey Coach since July 2020.

The Tigers moved to NCAA Division I women's ice hockey as a member of College Hockey America (CHA) for the 2012–13 season, after many years at Division III as part of the ECAC West conference. The team's conference affiliation was transferred to Atlantic Hockey America following the merger of CHA and Atlantic Hockey in April 2024.

== History ==
RIT added women's varsity ice hockey for the 1975–1976 season. After many years in the ECAC East, RIT moved to the ECAC West league for the 2007–08 season. The team made three NCAA tournament appearances at the Division III level, in 2007, 2011, and 2012, with a record of 5–2 in tournament games. They lost their lone game in the 2007 campaign to Amherst College. In their 2011 campaign, the lady Tigers lost at home, in the Frozen Four final, to Norwich University.

In 2012, the Tigers won their first national championship, on home ice, against Norwich University. It was the third-ever national championship for RIT's athletic program and first in women's sports.

On March 20, 2012, RIT announced that the women's team would move up to Division I for the 2012–13 season, as the men's team had six years prior, and join the College Hockey America conference.

After a successful first season at the Division I level in which the team went 16–16–5, even after losing their first DI game 6–2 to the Mercyhurst Lakers, the Tigers advanced to the CHA semifinals where they fell to the Syracuse Orange, 2–1 in overtime.

The next season was yet another season to remember. The Tigers participated in the Frozen Frontier, a ten-day hockey festival at Rochester's Frontier Field. The Tigers fell 2–6 to the Clarkson Golden Kights. The Tigers went on to win eleven out of their last eighteen games and won the CHA championship 2–1 in double overtime against the team that defeated them in their first ever Division I game, the Mercyhurst Lakers.

In 2014–15, their first season at the 4,300-seat Gene Polisseni Center, the Tigers went 15–19–5 and finished in last place in the CHA. But they won every game in the 2015 CHA Tournament, beating Robert Morris and Mercyhurst in the leadup to their 2–1 victory over Syracuse in double overtime, to capture their second straight CHA championship. The trophy this year came with the CHA's first-ever automatic bid to the NCAA Tournament, where the Tigers fell 2–6 to the eventual champions, #2 Minnesota.

In 2015, Bruce Bates, an MIT trustee emeritus and women's ice hockey season ticket holder, donated RIT's first athletic endowment to the women's ice hockey team, to support the head coach position.

On July 10, 2018, it was announced that long-time head coach Scott McDonald would be stepping down as head coach of the women's hockey team. He left as the all-time victory leader for the women's team, compiling a 205-154-29 record in 12 seasons. Chad Davis was announced as his replacement on August 22, 2018 with former Buffalo Beauts player Hannah McGowan being hired as assistant coach.

On April 30, 2020, it was reported that RIT parted ways with Davis and McGowan as coaches. Davis compiled a 24-37-9 record in two seasons as head coach.

On July 17, 2020, former RIT hockey player and captain Celeste Brown was named the next head coach of the program.

== Season-by-season results ==
Won championship	Lost championship	Conference champions	League leader

Year	Coach	W	L	T	Conference	Conf. W	Conf. L	Conf. T	Finish	Conference Playoffs	NCAA Tournament
2025–26	Celeste Brown	16	18	0	AHA	11	13	0	4th AHA	Lost Quarterfinals vs. Syracuse (3–4 2OT)	Did not qualify
2024–25	Celeste Brown	16	17	4	AHA	8	10	2	4th AHA	Won Quarterfinals vs. Lindenwood (4-0); Lost Semifinals vs. Penn State (2-3, 0-4)	Did not qualify
2023–24	Celeste Brown	13	19	3	CHA	7	12	1	4th CHA	Lost Semifinals vs. Penn State (1–2, 0–4)	Did not qualify
2022–23	Celeste Brown	4	26	2	CHA	1	13	2	5th CHA	Did not qualify	Did not qualify
2021–22	Celeste Brown	2	27	4	CHA	1	12	3	5th CHA	Won First Round vs. Lindenwood (6-4); Lost Semifinals vs. Syracuse (3-2)	Did not qualify
2020–21	Celeste Brown	1	15	0	CHA	1	14	0	5th CHA	Lost First Round vs. Robert Morris (0–4)	Did not qualify
2019–20	Chad Davis	12	19	4	CHA	5	13	2	5th CHA	Lost First Round vs. Penn State (1–4)	Did not qualify
2018–19	Chad Davis	12	18	5	CHA	8	11	1	5th CHA	Lost First Round vs. Penn State (1–4)	Did not qualify
2017–18	Scott McDonald	4	28	3	CHA	1	19	0	6th CHA	Lost First Round vs. Syracuse (1–5)	Did not qualify
2016–17	Scott McDonald	7	27	2	CHA	4	14	2	6th CHA	Won First Round vs. Penn State (2–1); Lost Semifinals vs. Syracuse (0-4)	Did not qualify
2015–16	Scott McDonald	8	27	1	CHA	4	15	1	6th CHA	Lost First Round vs. Penn State (0-2, 2–3)	Did not qualify
2014–15	Scott McDonald	15	19	5	CHA	5	12	3	6th CHA	Won First Round vs. Robert Morris (3–1, 1–0); Won Semifinals vs. Mercyhurst (4–1); Won Championship vs. Syracuse (2–1 2OT)	Lost in First Round vs. Minnesota (2–6)
2013–14	Scott McDonald	20	15	3	CHA	11	7	2	3rd CHA	Won First Round vs. Penn State (3–2 OT, 2–0); Won Semifinals vs. Robert Morris (4–1); Won Championship vs. Mercyhurst (2–1 2OT)	Ineligible (transition year)
2012–13	Scott McDonald	16	16	5	CHA	7	8	5	3rd CHA	Won First Round vs. Penn State (1–0, 3–2 OT); Lost Semifinals vs. Syracuse (1–2 OT)	Ineligible (transition year)
2011–12	Scott McDonald	28	1	1	D-III ECAC West	16	1	1	1st ECAC West	Won in Semifinal vs. Potsdam (6–1); Won Championship vs. Plattsburgh (5–1)	Won in First Round vs. Concordia (Minn.) (5–2); Won in Frozen Four vs. Plattsburgh (2–1 OT); Won Championship vs. Norwich (4–1)
2010–11	Scott McDonald	26	2	2	D-III ECAC West	15	1	2	1st ECAC West	Won in Semifinal vs. Utica (2–0); Won Championship vs. Plattsburgh (2–1)	Won in First Round vs. Adrian (10–1); Won in Frozen Four vs. Middlebury (5–2); Lost in Championship vs. Norwich (2–5)
2009–10	Scott McDonald	19	5	3	D-III ECAC West	13	3	2	3rd ECAC West	Won in First Round vs. Potsdam (5–0); Lost in Semifinals vs. Elmira (1–2 OT)	Did not qualify

== Current roster ==
As of October 9, 2024

No.	Nat.	Player	Class	Pos	Height	DoB	Hometown	Previous team
2		Bailey Kehl	Senior	D	5' 3" (1.6 m)	2002-03-06	Quincy, Washington	Okanagan Hockey Academy (CSSHL)
4		Jessie Burks	Senior	D	5' 4" (1.63 m)	2003-02-28	Sun Valley, Idaho	Rink Hockey Academy Kelowna (CSSHL)
5		Bronwyn Khangsar	Senior	D	5' 6" (1.68 m)	2003-03-05	Lewisville, Texas	Dallas Stars Elite (19U AAA)
6		Athena Vasdani	Senior	F	5' 8" (1.73 m)	2003-09-01	Oakville, Ontario	Burlington Jr. Barracudas (OWHL)
7		Kyla Bear	Senior	D	5' 7" (1.7 m)	2003-07-05	Ochapowace, Saskatchewan	Rink Hockey Academy Kelowna (CSSHL)
8		Kailey Favro	Freshman	F	5' 2" (1.57 m)	2006-05-23	Danville, California	St. Mary's High School (US-HS)
9		Jordyn Bear	Senior	F	5' 7" (1.7 m)	2003-07-05	Ochapowace, Saskatchewan	Rink Hockey Academy Kelowna (CSSHL)
10		Zoe Ziotas	Freshman	F	5' 2" (1.57 m)	2006-04-18	Markham, Ontario	Durham West Jr. Lightning (OWHL)
11		Brac Kelley	Freshman	F	5' 8" (1.73 m)		Wilkes-Barre, Pennsylvania	Northwood School (JWHL)
13		Addie Alvarez	Sophomore	F	5' 5" (1.65 m)	2005-06-30	Rochester, New York	Syracuse Valley Eagles (19U AAA)
14		Annie Burks	Senior	F	5' 8" (1.73 m)	2003-02-28	Sun Valley, Idaho	Rink Hockey Academy Kelowna (CSSHL)
15		Jaiden Fahrny	Junior	F	5' 3" (1.6 m)	2004-01-27	Pittsburgh, Pennsylvania	Clarkson Golden Knights (ECAC)
16		Megan McCormick (C)	Senior	F	5' 7" (1.7 m)	2002-11-02	Clarendon Hills, Illinois	Team Illinois (HPHL)
17		Ireland Stein	Freshman	F	5' 9" (1.75 m)	2006-12-15	Saskatoon, Saskatchewan	Saskatoon Stars (SFU18AAAHL)
18		Lexi Sung	Junior	F	5' 7" (1.7 m)	2004-09-03	Great Falls, Virginia	Washington Pride (JWHL)
20		Karly Kolssak	Junior	F	5' 8" (1.73 m)		Wheeling, Illinois	Chicago Young Americans (19U AAA)
21		Camryn Brownschidle	Junior	D	5' 6" (1.68 m)	2004-01-12	Clarence, New York	Stoney Creek Jr. Sabres (OWHL)
22		Emma Pickering (A)	Sophomore	D	5' 4" (1.63 m)	2004-11-01	Fishers, Indiana	Gilmour Academy (US-HS)
23		Kylie Aquaro	Senior	F	5' 4" (1.63 m)		Yardley, Pennsylvania	Philadelphia Jr. Flyers (19U AAA)
24		Lisa Rulle	Sophomore	F	5' 4" (1.63 m)	2005-01-24	Pāle, Latvia	Luleå HF (NDHL)
25		Addie Carr	Senior	D	5' 9" (1.75 m)	2003-08-03	Glenview, Illinois	Chicago Young Americans (19U AAA)
26		Nicole Ness	Graduate	F	5' 7" (1.7 m)	2002-04-06	Anchorage, Alaska	St. Cloud State Huskies (WCHA)
27		Logan Marchese	Sophomore	F	5' 3" (1.6 m)	2005-06-15	Mississauga, Ontario	Oakville Jr. Hornets (OWHL)
28		Mia Tsilemos (C)	Graduate	D	5' 7" (1.7 m)	2002-04-21	Ottawa, Ontario	Nepean Jr. Wildcats (OWHL)
29		Sophia Bellina	Junior	G	5' 7" (1.7 m)	2003-07-17	Cleveland, Ohio	Culver Academy (US-HS)
30		Sarah Coe	Senior	G	5' 8" (1.73 m)	2003-02-04	Brooklin, Ontario	Whitby Jr. Wolves (OWHL)
40		Brenna McNamara	Freshman	G	5' 9" (1.75 m)		Keswick, Ontario	North York Storm (OWHL)
43		Madison Buziak	Freshman	D	5' 4" (1.63 m)	2006-02-26	Saskatoon, Saskatchewan	Saskatoon Stars (SFU18AAAHL)

== Award winners ==
=== NCAA ===
==== Laura Hurd Award ====
The Laura Hurd Award is awarded annually to the national player of the year in NCAA Division III women's ice hockey.

2010–11: Sarah Dagg '11

==== Division III All-Americans ====
First Team

2003–04: Jen Gorczynski
2006–07: Stacey McConnell
2009–10: Sarah Dagg
2010–11: Traci Galbraith
2011–12: Kristina Moss

Second Team

2001–02: Colleen Baude, Jen Gorczynski
2002–03: Jen Gorczynski
2006–07: Danielle Nagymarosi
2008–09: Sarah Dagg, Erica Owczarczak
2010–11: Katie Stack
2011–12: Laura Chamberlain, Kourtney Kunichika

=== ECAC West ===
==== Coach of the Year ====
2004–05: Mike Grainsky (co-winner)
2008–09: Scott McDonald (co-winner with Greg Fargo of Elmira College)
2010–11: Scott McDonald

==== Player of the Year ====
2010–11: Sarah Dagg

==== Rookie of the Year ====
1988–89: Marisa Zona
1995–96: Maria Lewis
2007–08: Amanda Klassen (co-winner with Mel Brunet of Neumann University)
2009–10: Kim Schlattman

==== Tournament MVP ====
2011: Kourtney Kunichika

==== All-Tournament Team ====
2011: Laura Chamberlain (G), Traci Galbraith (D), Kourtney Kunichika (F), Ariane Yokoyama (F)
2012: Laura Chamberlain (G), Kourtney Kunichika (F), Kolbee McCrea (F), Danielle Read (D), Kim Schlattman (F)

=== Atlantic Hockey America ===
The College Hockey America (CHA) conference merged with Atlantic Hockey to form Atlantic Hockey America (AHA) in 2024. Award history was carried over in the merge, i.e. CHA awards were integrated into the history of the AHA.

==== Player of the Year ====
2018–19: Terra Lanteigne (G)

==== Best Defensive Forward ====
2014–15: Lindsay Grigg
2016–17: Mackenzie Stone

==== Individual Sportsmanship Award ====
2014–15: Taylor Thurston
2016–17: Caitlin Wallace

==== Coach of the Year ====
2018–19: Chad Davis

==== Goaltending Champion ====
The goaltending champion title is awarded to the goaltender with the best goals against average (GAA) in CHA play (only in-conference statistics are included). It should not be confused with the Goaltender of the Year award, which was introduced in the 2020–21 season.

2013–14: Ali Binnington (1.35 GAA)

==== All-CHA ====
First Team

2018–19: Terra Lanteigne (G)

Second Team

2012–13: Tenecia Hiller (F)
2013–14: Lindsay Grigg (D)
2019–20: Terra Lanteigne (G)
2022–23: Sarah Coe (G)

==== All-Rookie Team ====
2014–15: Christa Vuglar (D)
2015–16: Reagan Rust (D)
2016–17: Terra Lanteigne (G)
2019–20: Jaymee Nolan (F)
2021–22: Sarah Coe (G)

==== Tournament MVP ====
2014: Ali Binnington (G)
2015: Ali Binnington (G)

==== All-Tournament Team ====
2014: Ali Binnington (G), Lindsay Grigg (D), Kourtney Kunichika (F)
2015: Cassie Clayton (F), Lindsay Grigg (F), Morgan Scoyne (D)
2022: Abby Davies (F)

==== Weekly Honors ====
- Cassie Clayton, CHA Player of the Week (Week of March 9, 2015)
- Ali Binnington, CHA Goaltender of the Week (Week of March 9, 2015)

== Player histories ==
Sarah Dagg was recognized as the 2011 ECAC West Player of the Year after contributing to the Tigers program-record 26 wins. In addition, she helped the Tigers to their first conference regular season and post-season championships. Her points total for the season was 18 goals and 24 assists in 30 games.

In her senior season, Dagg advanced to the 2011 NCAA Division III Championship game. In her four seasons at RIT, the Tigers accumulated a won-loss record of 85–17–7, while finishing as the Tigers all-time leading scorer. Her career totals stand at 63 goals and 91 assists, while competing in 109 games. She is the Tigers all-time assists leader while recording three consecutive forty point seasons. In addition, she is second all-time at RIT with 20 power-play goals, while she stands tied at first place in shorthanded goals with nine.

== Tigers in professional hockey ==
= CWHL All-Star	= PHF All-Star	= Clarkson Cup Champion	= Isobel Cup Champion

Player	Position	Team(s)	League(s)	Years	Clarkson Cup	Isobel Cup
Brooke Baker	Forward	Metropolitan Riveters	PHF	1		
Celeste Brown	Forward	New York Riveters; Connecticut Whale	PHF	2		
Sarah Coe	Goaltender	Ottawa Charge	PWHL			
Kendall Cornine	Forward	Metropolitan Riveters	PHF	2		
Sarah Dagg	Forward	Burlington Barracudas; Brampton Thunder	CWHL	2		
Brinna Dochniak	Defense	Connecticut Whale	PHF	1		
Lindsay Grigg	Forward	Buffalo Beauts; HV71 Jönköping; Markham Thunder	PHF; SDHL; CWHL	3	1 (2018)	
Kourtney Kunichika	Forward	Buffalo Beauts	PHF	3		1 (2017)
Logan Land	Defense		PWHPA	1		
Terra Lanteigne	Goaltender		PWHPA	1		
Jetta Rackleff	Goaltender	Worcester Blades; Team New England	CWHL; PWHPA	3		
Mallory Rushton	Forward	Metropolitan Riveters	PHF	2		
Kandice Sheriff	Forward	Buffalo Beauts	PHF	1		
Erin Zach	Forward	Buffalo Beauts; Toronto Furies	PHF; CWHL	2		

=== CWHL Draft picks ===
Player	Draft year	Selection	Team
Sarah Dagg	2011 CWHL Draft	16	Burlington Barracudas
Katie Stack	2011 CWHL Draft	23	Toronto Furies
Erin Zach	2016 CWHL Draft	32	Toronto Furies
Jetta Rackleff	2016 CWHL Draft	52	Brampton Thunder

=== PHF Draft picks ===
Player	Draft year	Selection	Team
Kendall Cornine	2018 NWHL Draft	6	Metropolitan Riveters
Logan Land	2020 NWHL Draft	26	Buffalo Beauts

== See also ==
- RIT Tigers men's ice hockey
