= 2011–12 RIT Tigers women's ice hockey season =

NCAA Division III National Champions ECAC West Tournament Champions ECAC West Regular Season Champions NCAA Championship Game, W 4–1 vs. Norwich
- Conference: #1 ECACW
- Home ice: Frank Ritter Memorial Ice Arena

Rankings
- USCHO.com: #1

Record
- Overall: 28–1–1 (16–1–1)
- Home: 15–0–0
- Road: 12–1–1
- Neutral: 1–0–0

Coaches and captains
- Head coach: Scott McDonald (6th season)
- Assistant coaches: Chelsea Walkland; Jared DeMichiel
- Captain: Kim Schlattman
- Alternate captain(s): Tenecia Hiller; Ariane Yokoyama

The 2011–12 RIT Tigers women's ice hockey team was the Tigers' 37th season of varsity hockey and last at the NCAA Division III level. They represented Rochester Institute of Technology in the 2011–12 NCAA Division III women's ice hockey season. The team was coached by Scott McDonald in his sixth season as the program's head coach and played all of their home games at the Frank Ritter Memorial Ice Arena.

The Tigers compiled a 23–1–1 record in the regular season; they hosted and won the ECAC West Tournament for the second straight year, and hosted the NCAA Frozen Four (national semifinals and finals) for the second straight year. After a disappointment in the 2011 title game, the Tigers won the 2012 national championship on home ice. It was the first national championship for any women's athletic team from RIT, and the third overall.

Three days later, the university officially announced their application to move the program to the Division I level for the 2012–13 season.

== Roster ==
No.	Nat.	Player	Class	Pos	Height	DoB	Hometown	Previous team

== See also ==
- 2011–12 NCAA Division III women's ice hockey season
