= Paige Voight =

American ice hockey player (born 1997)

- Born: February 4, 1997 (age 29) St. Michael, Minnesota, United States
- Height: 171 cm (5 ft 7 in)
- Position: Forward
- Shoots: Left
- NWHL team Former teams: Metropolitan Riveters; PWHPA; Merrimack Warriors
- National team: United States
- Playing career: 2015–present

Paige Voight is an American ice hockey forward, currently playing with the Metropolitan Riveters of the National Women's Hockey League (NWHL).

== Career ==
During her high school career, she was named a semi-finalist for the Minnesota Ms. Hockey Award in 2015 and the Pioneer Press East Metro girls hockey player of the year in 2015.

From 2015 to 2019, she played for the Merrimack Warriors, posting 76 points in 140 NCAA games. She scored 19 points in 34 games in her rookie NCAA season, leading Merrimack in scoring and being named to the Hockey East Pro Ambitions All-Rookie Team.

After graduating, she spent the 2019–20 season with the newly formed Professional Women's Hockey Players Association (PWHPA). She spent the 2020 off-season playing in the Elite Women's Summer Hockey League, playing with Team Blue.

She was selected 16th overall by the NWHL's Metropolitan Riveters in the 2018 NWHL Draft. She left the PWHPA to sign with the Riveters for the 2020–21 NWHL season.

== International career ==
She represented the United States at the 2015 IIHF World Women's U18 Championship, playing in five games as the country won gold.

== Personal life ==
Voight has a degree in business and sports management.
