= Makenna Newkirk =

American ice hockey forward (born 1995)

- Born: August 11, 1995 (age 30) Scottsdale, Arizona, United States
- Height: 171 cm (5 ft 7 in)
- Position: Forward
- Shot: Right
- PWHPA team: New England
- Played for: Boston College Eagles
- Playing career: 2019–2021

Makenna Newkirk is an assistant D-1 women's hockey coach at Pennsylvania State University. Her additional coaching experience includes time with the North American Hockey Academy at the U16 and U19 levels, a season coaching at the Milton Academy in 2019-20, and a season coaching at Brown University in 2021-22.

== Career ==
As a youth player, she played for a travel team in Pittsburgh while living in Arizona, before eventually moving to Connecticut to attend Pomfret School.

Across 154 NCAA games, Newkirk put up 189 points, fifth highest in program history. She served as Boston College captain from 2017 to 2019. In her final year, she was named Hockey East Best Defensive Forward and a Hockey East Honorable Mention All-Star.

She was drafted 7th overall by the Connecticut Whale in the 2018 NWHL Draft. After graduating, she joined the PWHPA. She captained a team in the Dream Gap Tour exhibition in Tempe, Arizona.
