= Samantha Ridgewell =

Canadian ice hockey player (born 1996)

- Born: July 16, 1996 (age 30) Outlook, Saskatchewan, Canada
- Height: 5 ft 11 in (180 cm)
- Weight: 154 lb (70 kg; 11 st 0 lb)
- Position: Goaltender
- Catches: Left
- PWHL team Former teams: PWHL Ottawa: HV71; Toronto Six; Djurgårdens IF; Merrimack Warriors
- Playing career: 2015–present

Samantha "Sam" Ridgewell (born July 16, 1996) is a Canadian ice hockey goaltender currently on reserve with PWHL Ottawa of the Professional Women's Hockey League (PWHL).

== Playing career ==
Ridgewell began playing hockey at the age of five, in Conquest, Saskatchewan. In her youth, she played for a variety of teams in towns in her native province, including a boys' team in Outlook and the Coteau Hills Coyotes, formed of girls from across the province. In Grade 10, she began playing for the Saskatoon Stars in the Saskatchewan Female U18 AAA Hockey League.

From 2015 to 2019, she studied at Merrimack College in Massachusetts, in the United States, where she played for the Merrimack Warriors women's ice hockey program in the Hockey East conference of the NCAA Division I. She was named to the Hockey East All-Rookie Team in her first season with the university, making 694 saves in league play, the second-highest total in women's Hockey East history. She was only able to play 14 games in the 2016–17 season, missing large parts of the year due to a concussion. She posted five shutouts in the 2018–19 season, a Merrimack record, and was named to the Women's Hockey East Second Team All-Star Team. She was one of four women nominated for the NCAA's 2019 Hockey Humanitarian Award, the first women's player in Merrimack history to be nominated for the award.

After graduating, she explored opportunities in Sweden and Switzerland, eventually signing her first professional contract with Djurgårdens IF Hockey of the Swedish Women's Hockey League (SDHL) in Stockholm. In December 2019, she made 43 saves in a 3–1 victory over Brynäs IF. She earned her first professional shutout in late January 2020, making 19 saves in a 2–0 victory over SDE Hockey. She finished the season with a goals against average (GAA) of 2.03, the fifth best in the league, and a save percentage of .920, the seventh best in the league, as Djurgården were eliminated in the playoff semi-finals by HV71.

In May 2020, she announced her return to North America, signing with the expansion Toronto Six in the NWHL, the second goaltender to sign with the team after Elaine Chuli.

== Career statistics ==
=== Regular season and playoffs ===
			Regular season								Playoffs
Season	Team	League	GP	W	L	T/ OTL	Min	GA	SO	GAA	GP	W	L	T	Min	GA	SO	GAA
2011–12	Saskatoon Stars	SFU18AAAHL	15	11	3	1	836:00	24	2	1.72	6	4	2	0	396:00	11	0	1.67
2012–13	Saskatoon Stars	SFU18AAAHL	19	6	10	0	1014:00	44	2	2.60	6	3	3	0	366:00	17	0	2.79
2013–14	Notre Dame Hounds	JWHL	19	11	5	1	908:22	16	5	1.06	–	–	–	–	–	–	–	–
2014–15	Notre Dame Hounds	JWHL	8	5	1	1	481:11	13	1	1.62	–	–	–	–	–	–	–	–
2015–16	Merrimack Warriors	NCAA DI	28	5	19	3	1635:15	85	1	3.12	–	–	–	–	–	–	–	–
2016–17	Merrimack Warriors	NCAA DI	14	3	7	2	754:27	42	0	3.34	–	–	–	–	–	–	–	–
2017–18	Merrimack Warriors	NCAA DI	23	8	12	1	1275:03	50	3	2.35	–	–	–	–	–	–	–	–
2018–19	Merrimack Warriors	NCAA DI	33	15	7	10	1933:58	61	5	1.89	–	–	–	–	–	–	–	–
2019–20	Djurgårdens IF	SDHL	22	14	6	0	1268:19	43	1	2.03	5	2	3	0	336:41	15	0	2.67
2020–21	Toronto Six	NWHL	1	0	0	1	65:00	5	0	4.62	1	0	0	0	15:58	1	0	3.76
2021–22	Toronto Six	PHF	2	0	1	1	99:01	6	0	3.64	–	–	–	–	–	–	–	–
2021–22	HV71	SDHL	3	2	1	0	148:41	6	1	2.42	–	–	–	–	–	–	–	–
2022–23	Buffalo Beauts	PHF	2	1	0	0	74:31	0	1	0.00	–	–	–	–	–	–	–	–
PHF totals			17	1	1	2	238:32	11	1	2.77	1	0	0	0	15:58	1	0	3.76
SDHL totals			25	16	7	0	1417:00	49	2	2.07	5	2	3	0	336:41	15	0	2.67
NCAA totals			98	31	48	13	5598:43	238	9	2.55	–	–	–	–	–	–	–	–

Sources: Saskatchewan Female Under-18 AAA Hockey League, Junior Women's Hockey League, Elite Prospects, USCHO, Premier Hockey Federation

As of 24 February 2023

== Personal life ==
Ridgewell has a degree in health sciences.

She wears jersey number 34 after Finnish goaltender Miikka Kiprusoff, who was her favourite player growing up.
