= Dominique Kremer =

American ice hockey player (born 1997)

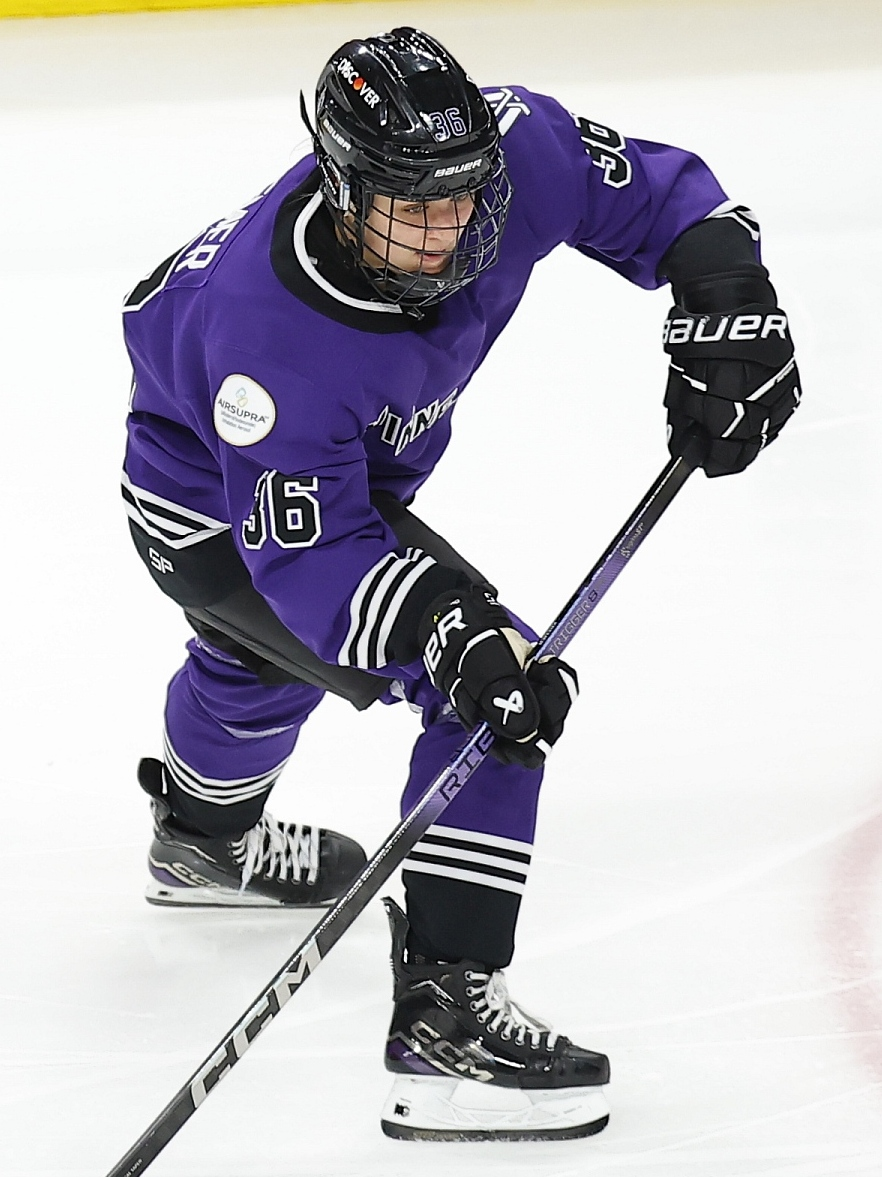
- Kremer with PWHL Minnesota in 2024
- Born: June 9, 1997 (age 29) Dubuque, Iowa, U.S.
- Height: 5 ft 6 in (168 cm)
- Position: Defense
- Shot: Right
- Played for: SDE HF; PWHL Minnesota; Buffalo Beauts; Djurgårdens IF; Merrimack Warriors
- Playing career: 2015–2025

Dominique Kremer (born June 9, 1997) is an American retired ice hockey defenseman. She was the final team captain in Buffalo Beauts history, and won the Walter Cup with PWHL Minnesota in 2024.

== Playing career ==
Kremer began skating at the age of three, playing hockey for the first time two years later. She later played with the St. Louis Lady Blues organisation, before attending Shattuck-St. Mary's in Minnesota for high school.

From 2015 to 2019, she attended Merrimack College, scoring 56 points in 138 NCAA Division I games with the Merrimack Warriors women's ice hockey team of the Hockey East conference. She scored her first collegiate career goal as a rookie on the October 3, 2015, against St. Cloud State. During the 2018–19 season, Kremer served as an alternate captain for Merrimack and was named to the All-WHEA Third Team.

She was drafted 17th overall by the Connecticut Whale in the 2018 NWHL Draft. Instead of joining the National Women's Hockey League (NWHL; renamed Premier Hockey Federation in 2021) after graduating, she signed her first professional contract with Djurgårdens IF of the Swedish Women's Hockey League (SDHL), stating that she felt the SDHL was the league that offered the highest skill level. She scored 16 points in 36 games in her rookie SDHL season, the highest scoring defender on her team.

After originally planning to continue playing in Sweden, restrictions caused by the COVID-19 pandemic prompted her to return to North America to sign in the NWHL, joining the Buffalo Beauts for the 2020–21 NWHL season. She was the first player signed by newly named Beauts general manager Nate Oliver.

Kremer played the 2023–24 season in the Professional Women's Hockey League (PWHL) with PWHL Minnesota, appearing in 12 games. She then spent the 2024-25 season with SDE HF, before announcing her retirement on July 8, 2025.

== Personal life ==
At Merrimack College, she majored in international studies and French, with a minor in pre-law.

== Career statistics ==
Note: GP = Games played; G = Goals; A = Assists; Pts = Points; PIM = Penalty minutes;

			Regular season					Playoffs
Season	Team	League	GP	G	A	Pts	PIM	GP	G	A	Pts	PIM
2015–16	Merrimack Warriors	HEA	34	2	9	11	6	—	—	—	—	—
2016–17	Merrimack Warriors	HEA	34	4	11	15	16	—	—	—	—	—
2017–18	Merrimack Warriors	HEA	34	2	7	9	18	—	—	—	—	—
2018–19	Merrimack Warriors	HEA	36	7	14	21	14	—	—	—	—	—
2019–20	Djurgårdens IF	SDHL	36	5	11	16	12	5	0	1	1	0
2020–21	Buffalo Beauts	NWHL	6	0	0	0	4	—	—	—	—	—
2021–22	Buffalo Beauts	PHF	20	6	5	11	8	1	0	0	0	0
2022–23	Buffalo Beauts	PHF	23	1	9	10	9	—	—	—	—	—
2023–24	PWHL Minnesota	PWHL	12	0	0	0	0	—	—	—	—	—
2024–25	SDE Hockey	SDHL	36	4	8	12	6	8	0	1	1	0
SDHL totals			72	9	19	28	18	13	0	2	2	0
PHF totals			49	7	14	21	21	1	0	0	0	0
PWHL totals			12	0	0	0	0	—	—	—	—	—
