= Celeste Brown (ice hockey) =

American ice hockey player and coach

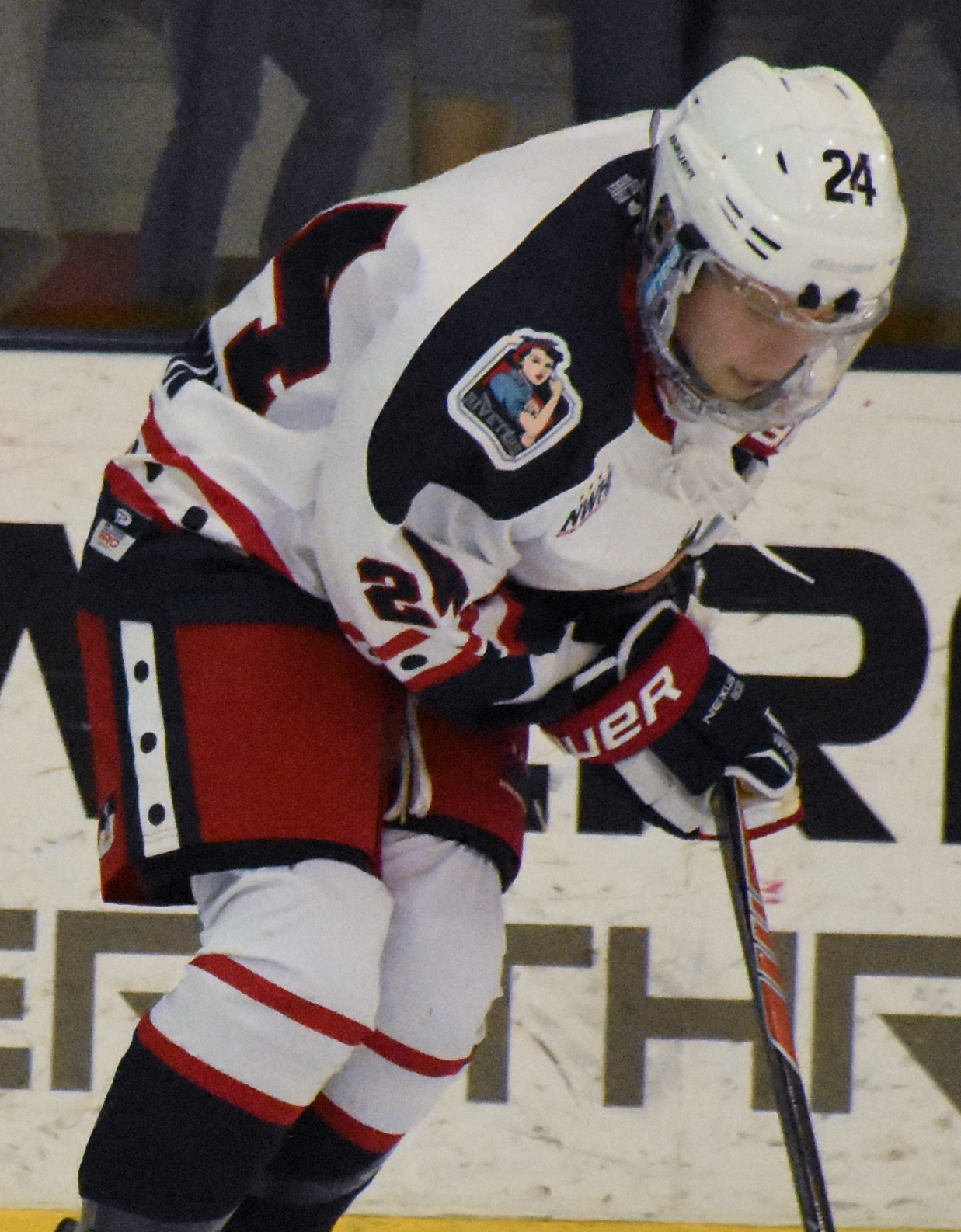
- Brown in 2015
- Born: May 29, 1992 (age 34) Great Falls, Montana, U.S.
- Height: 5 ft 6 in (168 cm)
- Position: Forward
- Shot: Right
- Played for: New York Riveters; Connecticut Whale
- Playing career: 2015–2017
- Coaching career

Current position
- Title: Head coach
- Team: RIT Tigers
- Conference: Atlantic Hockey America

Biographical details
- Education: Rochester Institute of Technology

Coaching career (HC unless noted)
- 2016–2017: Connecticut College (assistant)
- 2017–2020: Penn State Nittany Lions (assistant)
- 2020–: RIT Tigers

Head coaching record
- Overall: 36–104–13 (.278)

Celeste Brown (born May 29, 1992) is an American former professional ice hockey player in the PHF, and is the current head coach of the RIT Tigers women's ice hockey team. Brown previously played for the New York Riveters during the 2015–16 NWHL season and the Connecticut Whale.

In 2017, she was named an Assistant Coach for Penn State Women's Ice Hockey.

== Career ==
During college, Brown played for the Rochester Institute of Technology women's ice hockey team, winning the NCAA Division III National Championship in her freshman year. The team moved up to Division I the next year, and she later served as a captain of the team.

Brown signed a professional contract with the New York Riveters in 2015, joining the franchise for the 2015/16 NWHL season as a forward. In August 2016, it was announced that Brown had joined the Connecticut Whale as a practice player for the 2016/17 season.

In 2017, she was named an Assistant Coach for Penn State Women's Ice Hockey.

On July 17, 2020, Brown was named the head coach of the RIT Tigers women's ice hockey team, where she played from 2011 to 2015.
