= Collapse of the Canadian Women's Hockey League =

2019 dissolution of a hockey league

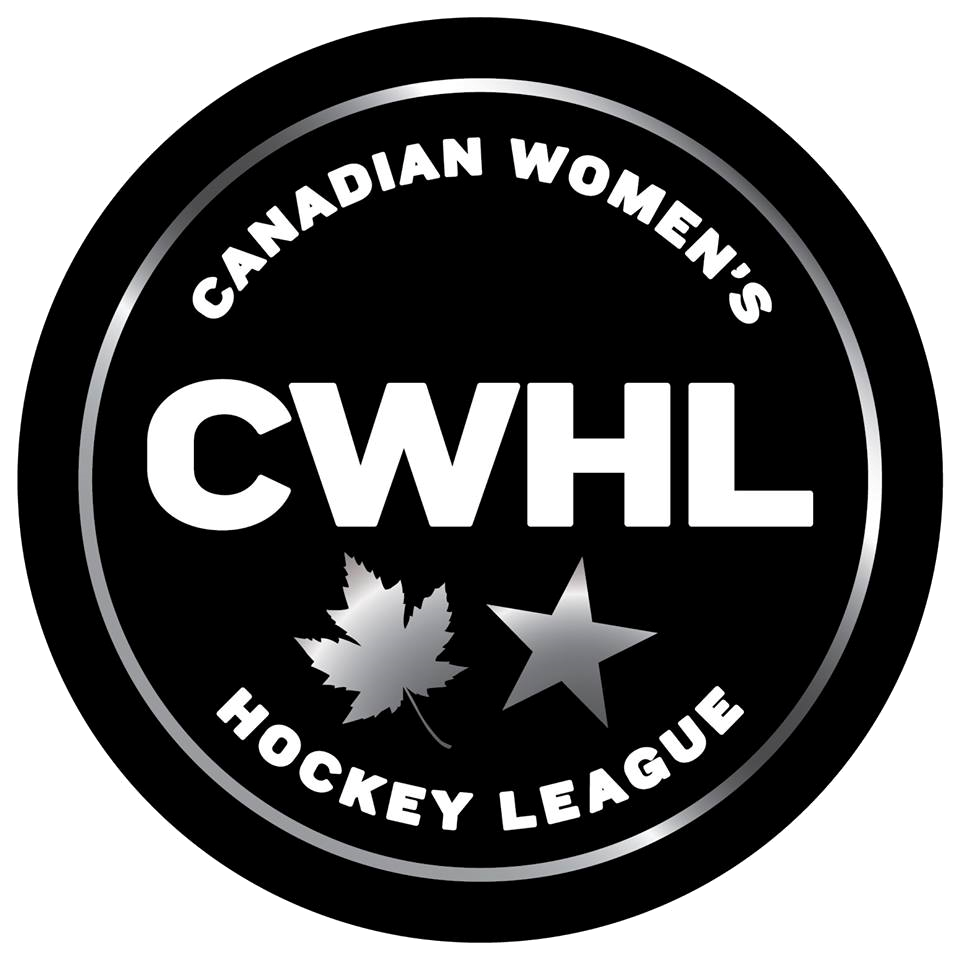
- Date: March 31 – May 1, 2019
- Also known as: French: L'effondrement de la Ligue canadienne de hockey féminin
- Cause: Official: Unsustainable league finances; Low attendance; Fragmentation of North American women's hockey market
- Participants: Canadian Women's Hockey League (CWHL); Jayna Hefford (CWHL Commissioner); Liz Knox (CWHL Players' Association Chair)
- Outcome: Legal dissolution of the CWHL; Auctioning of league artifacts; #ForTheGame players' strike and creation of the PWHPA; Takeover of the Shenzhen KRS Vanke Rays by the ZhHL; Severing of NHL affiliations with the NWHL's Buffalo Beauts and Metropolitan Riveters; NWHL expansion into Toronto

The collapse of the Canadian Women's Hockey League occurred in the spring of 2019. Previously one of the top women's ice hockey leagues in the world, the Canadian Women's Hockey League (CWHL; French: Ligue canadienne de hockey féminin; LCHF) announced on 31 March 2019, that it would be folding effective 1 May.

The collapse had a major influence on women's professional hockey, leading directly to the creation of the Professional Women's Hockey Players Association (PWHPA), and the subsequent establishment of the Professional Women's Hockey League (PWHL).

== Background ==
The Canadian Women's Hockey League was established in 2007 as a Canadian women's amateur senior league. It was originally led by a group of players, notably Lisa-Marie Breton, Mandy Cronin, Allyson Fox, Kathleen Kauth, Kim McCullough, Sami Jo Small and Jennifer Botterill, all of whom played in the original National Women's Hockey League before it folded the same year. In 2009, the Clarkson Cup began to be awarded to the CWHL champions as the best women's hockey club in Canada. Throughout the first half of the 2010s, the league continued to grow and underwent a number of structural changes, including the dissolution of several teams, expansion into the United States, and the introduction of affiliations with a number of National Hockey League (NHL) teams.

In 2015, former Northeastern University Huskies player and entrepreneur Dani Rylan founded a new National Women's Hockey League (NWHL), after having been in talks to bring a New York expansion team to the CWHL. The league would pay all of its players a salary of at least $10,000, the first women's hockey league to do so. However, halfway through the NWHL's second season the league announced massive salary cuts of up to 50%, a move that the league cited as necessary for its sustainability. Despite the cuts, the NWHL would continue to grow, adding the Minnesota Whitecaps to its roster of teams in 2018. However, the league's relationship with the CWHL was strained, and several players raised concerns about the working conditions players faced in the NWHL.

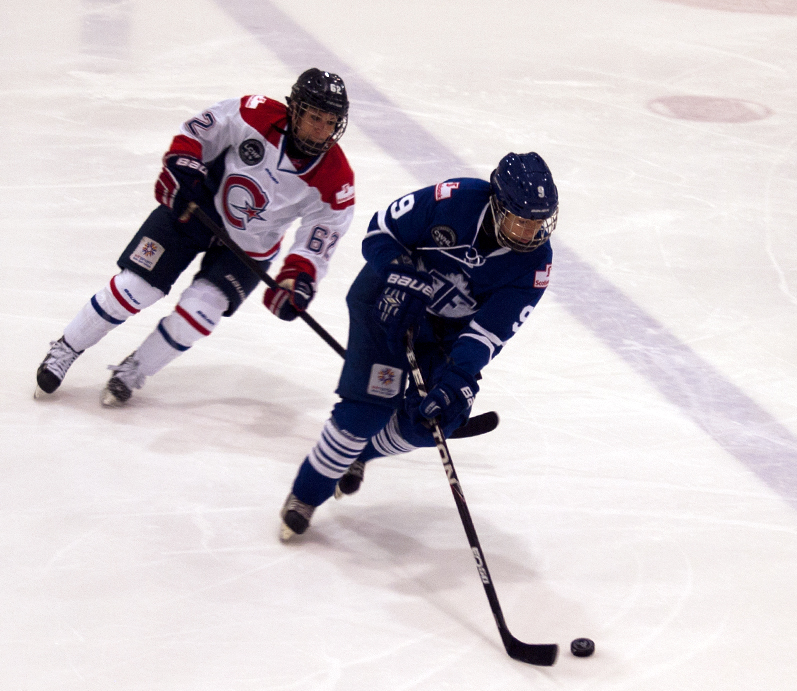
Les Canadiennes de Montréal in action against the Toronto Furies in 2015

In 2016, Riksserien, the top flight of women's hockey in Sweden, underwent a restructuring, becoming the Swedish Women's Hockey League (SDHL). In 2018, the league's most successful club, Luleå HF/MSSK, announced that it would begin paying all of its players, the first team in the league to do so. In 2017, the Finnish Naisten-SM Sarja was restructured into the Naisten Liiga, with the Finnish Ice Hockey Association re-ranking the league as the second most important league in the country, having previously ranked it behind all of the senior men's leagues.

In March 2017, the players of the United States women's national team announced their intention to strike ahead of the 2017 IIHF Women's World Championship, after over a year of failed negotiations with USA Hockey concerning wages and playing conditions. The strike was ultimately successful, with the players reaching a four-year deal with USA Hockey, including increased pay and pay outside of the Olympic period. The strike came following similar actions taken by the American national women's soccer team to improve their conditions.

Prior to the start of the 2017–18 season, the CWHL expanded to China, adding the Vanke Rays and Kunlun Red Star. The expansion was part of a major deal with the Chinese government, which was seeking to develop its national women's hockey team ahead of the 2022 Winter Olympics in Beijing. In September 2017, the league announced that it would start paying all of its players, with a minimum salary of $2,000 and a maximum of $10,000, with each team having a $100,000 salary cap. League commissioner Brenda Andress cited the Chinese expansion, as well as increased sponsorships and licensing rights, as making the move possible, adding that "we know this plan is sustainable."

=== #OneLeague ===
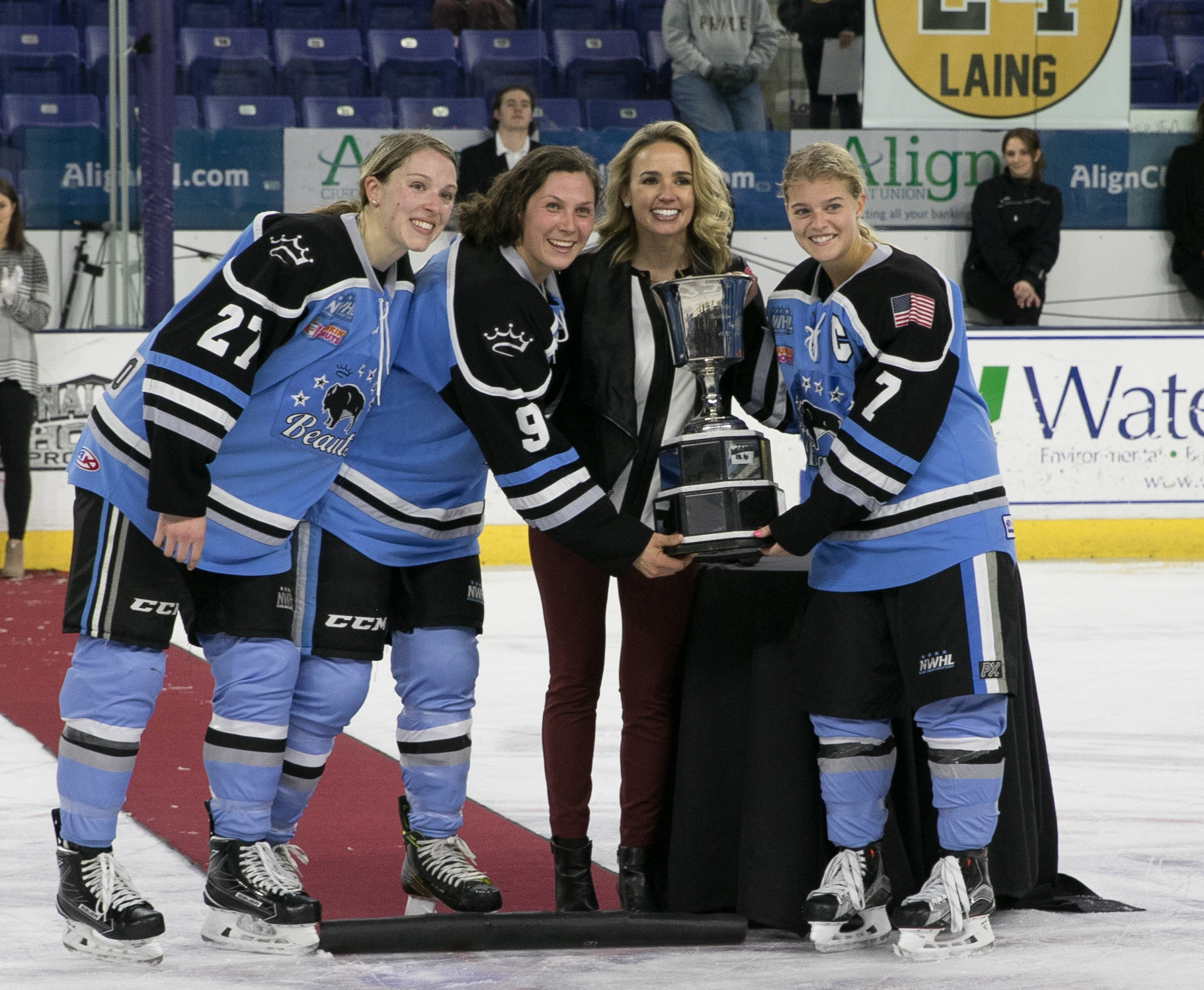
NWHL Commissioner Dani Rylan hands the Isobel Cup to the Buffalo Beauts in 2017

As the NWHL continued to grow and the CWHL began paying its players, discussions intensified about potentially merging the two leagues to form a single, unified professional North American women's hockey league. In October 2018, NWHL commissioner Dani Rylan stated that "One league is inevitable," while CWHL's interim commissioner Jayna Hefford called a merger "a priority."

Despite player support for a merger, and a stated willingness from the leadership of both leagues, negotiations between the leagues failed to produce results. One point of contention was differing visions of the potential role of the NHL in a unified league, and the NHL's refusal to get involved in negotiations, stating that it did not believe in either the NWHL's or the CWHL's models. The different structures between the leagues also proved hard to reconcile, with the CWHL structured as a not-for-profit and the NWHL structured as a for-profit association. Issues were also raised surrounding which teams would transition to a unified league, with uncertainty surrounding geographically close teams (such as the NWHL's Boston Pride and the CWHL's Worcester Blades) and the CWHL's Chinese teams, as well as the respective trophies of each league, the Clarkson Cup and the Isobel Cup.

== Collapse ==
In July 2018, CWHL commissioner Brenda Andress announced she would be stepping down and Jayna Hefford was named interim commissioner. That summer, the league's two Chinese teams were merged to form the Shenzhen KRS Vanke Rays. The league also underwent a restructuring, eliminating its board of governors and introducing an 11 member board of directors with more clearly defined legal responsibilities. The restructuring raised concerns, with some expressing unease about the fact that seven of the eleven members were entirely new to the league's governance. After the restructuring, the league's single largest sponsor, Graeme Roustan of Roustan Capital, announced that he was withdrawing his sponsorship from the league, citing a lack of transparency and a lack of faith in the league's leadership.

Despite the initial turmoil, the 2018–19 season appeared to be a success for both the league and women's hockey. Brianna Decker, along with NWHLer Kendall Coyne Schofield, made history as the first women to compete in the National Hockey League All-Star Game. Teams met their league-mandated $65,000 fundraising goals with success, with some teams managing to meet the goal through ticket sales alone. The 2019 Clarkson Cup final, won by the Calgary Inferno, drew a TV audience of 175,000.

The day before the final, the league held a meeting with its general manager to debrief the season and discuss plans for improving the next season. Chelsea Purcell, the Markham Thunder general manager, was due to leave the team and her full-time job outside of hockey to become the league's full-time head of strategic partnerships.

On 29 March 2019, a week after the final, the CWHL's board of directors met secretly. The ten members present voted unanimously to dissolve the league. Despite having hit record broadcasting and social media metrics during the 2018–19 season, the board believed that private internal documents, including an audit Hefford had been asked to perform before the season, proved that the league was economically unsustainable. Among the concerns raised were the reluctance of sponsors to renegotiate their sponsorships in line with the growth of the league and ticket sales, the average price of a ticket being around $15, and sales varying dramatically between teams with some regularly selling out and others rarely managing to attract more than a few dozen spectators.

At 9:30 in the morning on 31 March, the league asked the heads of the CWHL Players' Association, as well as the league's general managers and coaches, to join a conference call. Half an hour later, the rest of the league's players and staff were asked to join. Most of those who were invited to the call were expecting positive news from the league, such as an expansion, the promotion of Hefford to full-time commissioner, or a merger with the NWHL. However, it quickly became apparent that the call was bringing bad news. A few minutes after the end of the second conference call, the league issued a press release to the public: just one week after the successful 2019 Clarkson Cup finals and just five days before the start of the 2019 IIHF Women's World Championship, the CWHL announced that it would be folding on May 1.

At the time of the league's collapse, the CWHL had six teams in three countries, approximately 150 players, and an overall budget of over $3.5 million, with player salaries ranging from $2,000 to $10,000. The league did not release attendance figures.

The decision appeared to have been made without consulting the league's players or coaching staff, and came as a shock to most of them, especially as many of the league's top players were preparing to play in the World Championships—Canadian national team captain Marie-Philip Poulin told La Presse that her plane had just touched down in Europe when she received the email inviting her to the call. Soon after the announcement, the CWHL Players' Association scrambled to take action, organizing a task force composed of players and coaches and releasing coordinated social media posts from players voicing their disappointment in the decision, stating that:

"This morning we were informed the #CWHL is folding. As players, we will do our best to find a solution so this isn't our last season of hockey but it's hard to remain optimistic. #NoLeague"

There were a handful of attempts from various parties to try and save the league. Talks occurred between the heads of the CWHL Players' Association and those of the NWHL Players' Association. Former governor general Adrienne Clarkson held discussions with the league to try and resurrect it. Vancouver-based producer Mark Bishop made a bid for the league, but was rejected as he did not present a business plan to the league and was unfamiliar to them. Former CWHL governor and investor W. Graeme Roustan made a bid to assume control of the league, offering to replace the entire CWHL board and to continue league operations into future seasons on his terms. His bid was also rejected.

Multiple CWHL teams stated that they intended to try and continue to operate, and there were reports of an anonymous, Toronto-based group drawing up legal paperwork to launch a new league. Those plans, however, did not materialise.

After the Canadian Football League asked the Canadian federal government for a $150 million bailout in 2020 during the COVID-19 pandemic, it was revealed that talks had taken place between the CWHL and the government for financial help to save the league. Despite asking for financial assistance only on the scale of a few hundred thousand dollars, and the government having previously identified insufficient funding as the main barrier to female sport participation in Canada, the talks were unsuccessful.

On 2 July 2019, the league shut down its website and released a final public communication in the form of an open letter written by board chair Laurel Walzak on behalf of the CWHL board addressed to fans, sponsors, donors, and the Canadian government. In the letter, the board detailed their reasons for folding the league, including their belief that it would take an annual budget of at least $5 million to run the league adequately and at least $10 million to run it professionally, as well as the board's support for the emerging #ForTheGame players' movement. The letter discussed the creation of the NWHL in 2015, believing that it had fragmented the women's hockey market in North America and that sponsors delayed necessary investments due to unrealistic expectations of a merger between the two leagues.

=== Liquidation process ===
According to the laws on non-profit organisations in the jurisdiction the CWHL was based in, the league was required to liquidate all its remaining assets to cover costs and pay off its debts. At the end of April 2019, the league began auctioning off assets, including league trophies. Despite the auction being legally necessary, it provoked deep unease among women's hockey fans, as the artifacts were valued pieces of hockey history and there was no way to ensure the proper preservation of the artifacts if they were purchased by private bidders. Queen's University professor Courtney Szto stated that, "the gut wrenching part about seeing these trophies go up for sale as if they are regular commodities and not historical and cultural artifacts is because it's possible that a big part of women's hockey history could be erased."

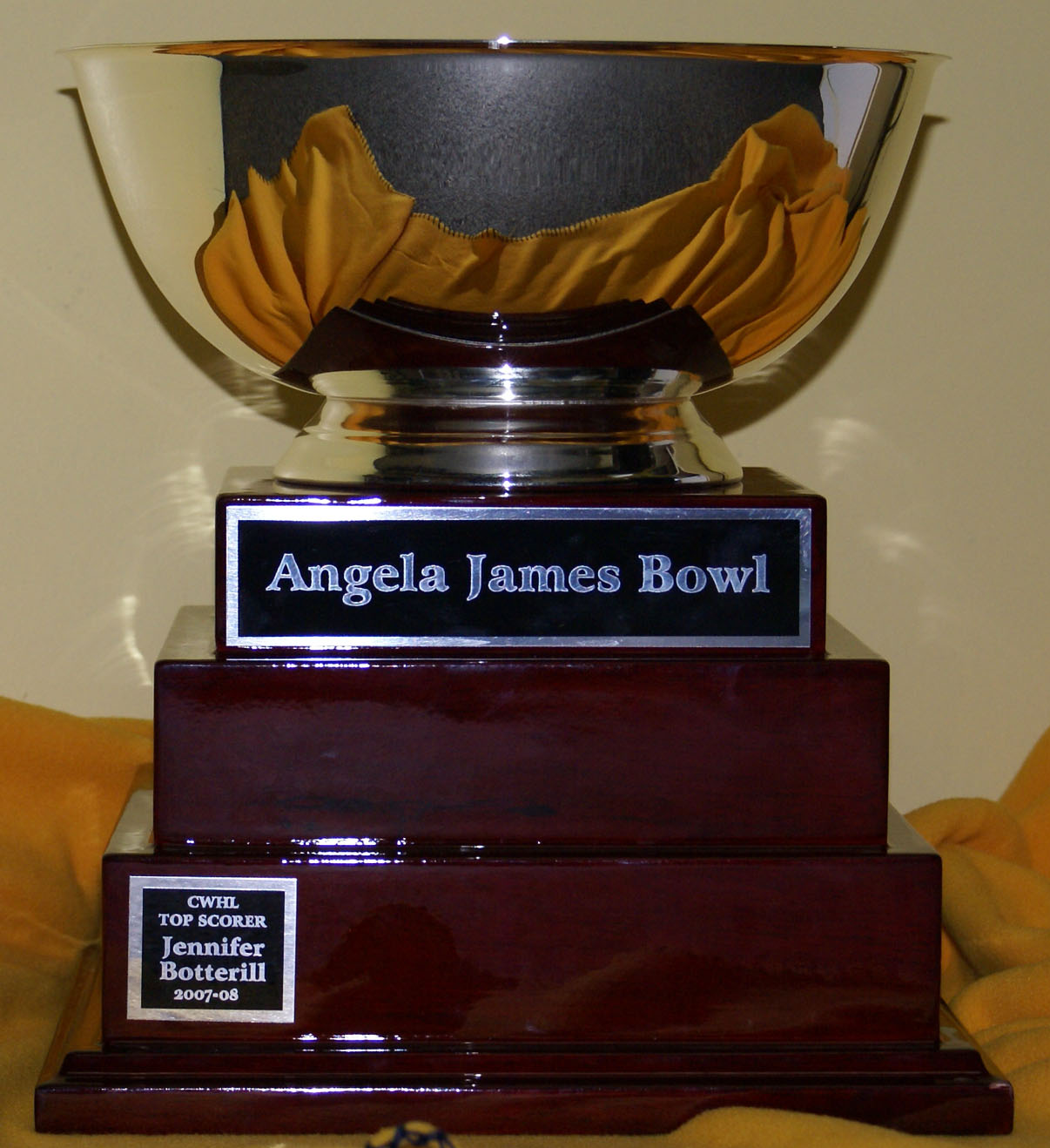
The Angela James Bowl, awarded to the top CWHL scorer, in 2008

After facing criticism for a lack of involvement in trying to preserve CWHL artifacts, the Hockey Hall of Fame (HHOF) stated that their status as a charity prevented them from directly purchasing any artifacts and that their curation criteria were restricted to trophies and artifacts used in games. The HHOF did state that they would be able to provide tax receipts for any items donated to the HHOF and that they had held a conference call with the CWHL. A few days after the start of the auction, the league removed a few trophies from the listing, stating that they were in talks with bidders who would donate the trophies to the HHOF. Seven out of the ten trophies would end up being donated.

Two women's hockey journalists, Kirsten Whelan and Jared Book, launched a GoFundMe campaign to try and preserve as many artifacts as possible from the auction. They eventually raised around $6,700 before the auction, using it to save Caroline Ouellette's jersey from her rookie season, and help other parties that would donate trophies to the HHOF, as well as inscribing the names of the 2018–19 award winners on the trophies and providing some funds directly to players.

Soon after the announcement of the collapse, the Markham Thunder announced that they would be auctioning off team assets to help provide funds for their players. They were forced to reboot the auction, however, after the league stepped in to clarify that all teams would have to sell their assets as part of the league's liquidation process, and that since teams were owned by the league, team assets were property of the league. The money raised from the auctions would therefore go to the league instead of to players directly.

A number of investors, including the NHL, also contributed some money towards helping the CWHL pay off its remaining debts and finish paying players their season salaries.

=== Reactions ===
The news of the collapse sparked widespread shock among players and the hockey community. Sami Jo Small, one the league's original co-founders, stated that the news came out of nowhere to her and that, as a general manager, "during this entire season I was never asked once to bring in more money or spend less money. That's why the confusion — it was just such a blow and a shock when we could have been doing a lot of different things along the way." Canadian senator and Olympic committee director Marty Deacon called the collapse of the league "a tremendous loss."

Multiple players expressed feelings that the collapse proved that it was time for players to be more outspoken and proactive in demanding support for women's hockey. CWHL Players' Association chair Liz Knox stated that:

"I think it's kind of opened our eyes to something that we always knew was there, and to seize the opportunity to really ask for more for our sport. I see more often, women, especially female athletes, being told to be grateful for opportunity. And certainly we are, but at some point that line of being grateful has to be broken to ask for more or to demand for more... There's got to be better out there for us."

Fran Rider, president of the Ontario Women's Hockey Association (OWHA), stated that the collapse "demonstrates the challenges female sports continue to face in attracting much needed and much deserved financial support." Former Canadian Olympian Caroline Ouellette stated, "I think one hundred per cent the players know they are the ones holding the power. They know the game is going to take the direction that they want it to take."

Some players expressed cautious optimism about new opportunities that could be launched in the wake of the league's collapse, with retired Canadian Olympian Hayley Wickenheiser tweeting: "One step back, two steps forward perhaps?" Inferno forward Dakota Woodworth stated that she was "fully confident and fully hopeful that something better is definitely coming just because it has to." Others in the hockey community also expressed optimism, with Adrienne Clarkson stating, "I think something will arise out of this, and maybe it just had to collapse like this for something to come out of it which will work." Brock University professor Julie Stevens compared the situation to the early days of men's professional leagues and the rivalry between the NHL and the World Hockey Association (WHA) in the 1970s, noting that similar events have often been catalysts for significant new developments in the sport.

The NWHL released a statement responding to the collapse of the CWHL, stating that it was saddened by the CWHL's folding, but that the league was confident in its own growth and that it "respects the wishes of all players to consider their options." NHL Deputy Commissioner Bill Daly stated that, while he recognized the importance of professional women's hockey, the NHL would not get significantly involved as long as there were existing North American leagues.

The news of the CWHL's collapse was met with widespread dismay in the junior hockey community. Rolland Cyr, head of the Kitchener Minor Hockey Association, stated that the young girls in his league were hurt by the collapse and that "they would like the league back." Parents of young players also expressed fears over the collapse, with one parent telling the CBC: "What happens to my daughter when she finishes minor bantam? I don't know what that road is."

Many graduating collegiate players expressed deep uncertainty over the collapse of the league and the effect it would have on their hockey careers, since around half the potential professional roster spots in North America had disappeared overnight. Some Canadian commentators argued that the collapse of the CWHL proved that Canadian women's hockey was too reliant on the American university system to develop talent and called for the creation of better development circuits in Canada.

=== Causes ===
Insufficient revenue has been cited as the major cause behind the collapse of the CWHL, with the loss of major investors and one of the two Chinese teams during the 2018 off-season severely hurting the league's capacity to increase its revenue in line with expenses.

Despite financial statements obtained by The Hockey News apparently showing a $200,000 surplus in the 2018 fiscal year, the league seemed to have incurred significantly increased expenses, potentially in part due to the introduction of player salaries, which the league stated increased costs by around $600,000 per season. According to newspaper La Presse, the league had failed to increase revenues over the prior two years and had finished the 2018–19 season with a $300,000 deficit, its third in the last four seasons, and sixth since the creation of the league. Hefford also stated that she was unwilling to take similar actions as the NWHL to address deficits, notably cutting player salaries, believing that it was better for the league to fold than to move backwards.

Calgary Inferno general manager Kristen Hagg said that the lack of media coverage of the league as well as stereotypes about women's hockey contributed to the collapse of the league, stating that:

"We live in a society where people do not value women's sport. Most of us have been socialized to accept men's sport as dominant and somehow automatically more interesting. The problem is that once society internalizes falsehood, it's not easy to correct it. I've been to NHL games that are boring. Someone is playing the trap or maybe they just don't have it that day. They do play 82 games in a season after all. People watch women's hockey and if it isn't on-the-edge-of-your-seat-exciting for 60 minutes, it's not just worth their while."

The league's broadcast deal with Sportsnet also potentially contributed to the league's issues as, despite good ratings, the network only broadcast three games per season and did not have to pay the league any licensing fees. Women's sport historian M. Ann Hall argued that the lack of coverage hampered the league's chances to capitalize on its successes, and that the league had failed to find its niche in the sports marketplace.

Several commentators pointed to the split between the two North American leagues as a cause of the CWHL's collapse. Ken Wong, marketing professor at Queen's University, stated that "this is a very limited, not just pool of talent but pool of fans. So to split them up two ways like that made no sense at all." Other commentators pointed towards the CWHL's lack of marketing and the unavailability of easily accessible viewing options. Others mentioned the Chinese expansion as a potential cause, with rumours that the partnership was heavily disorganized, or that the Chinese government's large financial contributions to the CWHL budget inspired a sense of overconfidence among league leadership.

Other commentators have pointed towards a lack of vision in the league and a failure to consistently establish professional working conditions and structures for players, staff, and members of the media alike. At a PWHPA event in January 2020, former Toronto Furies defender Renata Fast stated that:

"I think we all wanted in the past our professional leagues to look professional to outsiders. But the truth is, it wasn't really behind the surface. We dealt with a lot of things that we were just like ‘OK, this is just normal. We have to make it look like this is OK.’ You couldn't have any structure when you played or any type of routine heading into a game because you never knew what was going to happen."

The National Hockey League received criticism for failing to do enough to support women's hockey, having invested only $50,000 per year to the CWHL and another $50,000 to the NWHL despite annual NHL revenues of several billion dollars, the NHL's stated goal of growing the game, and girls hockey being the fastest growing part of minor hockey in North America. A 2020 study from Saint Mary's University reported "little tangible benefit" from the NHL's minimal support of women's hockey and that "it is difficult to conceptualize the level at which women [in hockey] are viewed as commoditized tradable goods." Former WNBA president Val Ackerman, who had advised the NHL in 2011 not to launch a women's hockey league, stated that she now felt that the game had significantly grown and that "what's good for women's hockey is good for hockey and what's good for hockey would be good for the NHL."

The Institute for Research on Public Policy called the collapse of the CWHL part of a wider trend of struggles faced by non-profit organisations in Canada, describing the legal framework for non-profits as not allowing necessary investments which often result in non-profits failing to effectively retain key staff or incorporate new innovations into their practices.

== #ForTheGame ==
On 2 May 2019, one day after the formal dissolution of the CWHL, over 200 players, including almost all CWHL players, a large number of NWHL players, as well as some from other leagues such as the SDHL in Sweden, posted a statement on their social media feeds, using the hashtag #ForTheGame. The statement read:

We are fortunate to be ambassadors of this game that we revere so deeply and yet, more than ever, we understand the responsibility that comes with that ambassadorship: To leave this game in better shape than when we entered it. That is why we come together, over 200 players strong, to say it is time to create a sustainable professional league for Women's Hockey.

While we have all accomplished so much, there is no greater accomplishment than what we have the potential to do right here and right now -- not just for this generation of players, but for generations to come. With that purpose, we are coming together, not as individual players, but as one collective voice to help navigate the future and protect the players needs. We cannot make a sustainable living playing in the current state of the professional game. Having no health insurance and making as low as two thousand dollars a season means that players can't adequately train and prepare to play at the highest level.

Because of that, together as players, we will not play in ANY professional leagues in North America this season until we get the resources that professional hockey demands and deserves.

We may have represented different teams, leagues, and countries -- but this sport is one family. And the time is now for this family to unite. This is the moment we've been waiting for -- our moment to come together and say we deserve more. It's time for a long-term viable professional league that will showcase the greatest product of women's professional hockey in the world.

American law firm Ballard Spahr, who had previously worked with both the American national women's hockey and soccer team strikes, assisted the players.

Both the NFL Players Association and the NHL Players Association (NHLPA) released statements expressing solidarity with the strike, although the NHLPA was criticized by some for not taking more concrete measures to support the players. Not all women's players supported the statement, and some from the NWHL expressed concerns about it. NWHLPA chair Anya Packer expressed frustration with the movement, stating that she felt like they were against the NWHL and that there was a lack of transparency from the organizers. Boston Pride defender Kaleigh Fratkin also expressed doubts about #ForTheGame, stating that she had not received answers to questions she had asked the movement's organizers and that she was concerned about attempts to force the NWHL to fold.

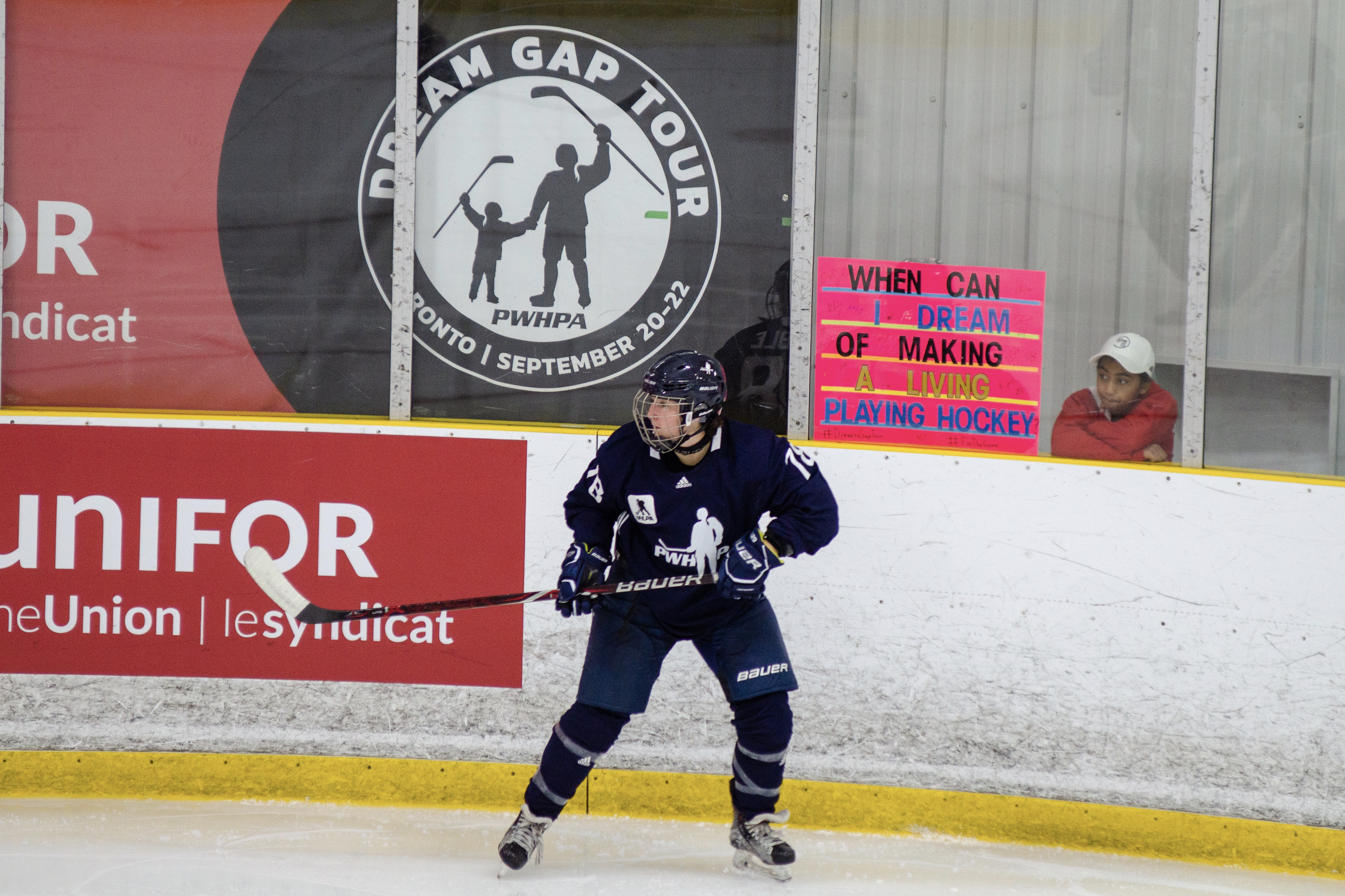
Former Toronto Furies forward Anissa Gamble with the PWHPA in September 2019

On 20 May 2019, the players formed a non-profit called the Professional Women's Hockey Players Association (PWHPA) to further push for their stated goals of establishing a league that provides financial and infrastructure resources, health insurance, and support and training programs for young female players. The PWHPA's tactics included a stated boycott of existing North American leagues, which effectively singled out the NWHL.

Referee Bryan Hicks was originally chosen as the organization's head of operations, but he was replaced by Jayna Hefford after a few months. The nine players chosen to make up the PWHPA's board of directors were Jocelyne Lamoureux, Hilary Knight, Kendall Coyne Schofield, Noora Räty, Shannon Szabados, Brianne Jenner, Liz Knox, Kimberly Sass, and Alyssa Gagliardi.

The PWHPA organized a number of events during the 2019–20 season, including exhibition games and appearances at the NHL and ECHL All-Star Games. The PWHPA also organized the Dream Gap Tour of exhibition matches between different teams made up of PWHPA players—the tour was named after the gap in opportunities to fulfill hockey dreams facing girls compared to boys. Despite the interruption of the COVID-19 pandemic, the PWHPA continued events during the 2020–21 season, including a more formal regional structure for rosters and a $1 million sponsorship deal from deodorant company Secret, the largest corporate commitment in North American women's hockey history to date.

A number of players in European leagues, such as the SDHL, joined the protest, although they would continue to play in Europe. Eight days after the #ForTheGame movement was launched, Kelty Apperson became the first #ForTheGame player to sign an overseas contract when she signed with SDE Hockey in Sweden. Jordan Juron became the first PWHPA player to re-join the NWHL, signing with the Boston Pride in January 2020.

The PWHPA proved successful in courting sustained corporate, media, and even NHL partnerships, consistently raising the profile of its movement and appearing to get closer to its goal of establishing a new, unified professional league. In 2022, the PWHPA entered a partnership with Mark Walter and Billie Jean King, which brought the PWHPA the financial support needed to move its goal to completion. In June 2023, Mark Walter Group and BJK Enterprises purchased the NWHL, which had rebranded as the Premier Hockey Federation (PHF) in 2021; PHF operations then ceased to make way for the establishment of a new league. In the meantime, the PWHPA organized a formal union and negotiated a collective bargaining agreement. The Professional Women's Hockey League (PWHL) began play in January 2024 with six teams in Canada and the US.

== Aftermath ==
The 2019 IIHF Women's World Championship began in Finland five days after the CWHL announced that it would be folding. The first top tier Women's World Championship to feature 10 teams instead of 8, the tournament proved a success. The rise of the Finland national team in particular attracted plaudits, as they shocked Canada in the semi-finals and almost won gold for the first time in a championship game that saw half of the entire population of Finland tune in on TV.

The CWHL collapse sparked a marked jump in media coverage of North American women's hockey and in discussions about the future of the game. Google Trends analysis showed a more than fivefold increase in Google searches for the league in the period following the announcement that it was folding. The analysis also showed a similar increase in searches for the NWHL.

Calgary mayor Naheed Nenshi declared 29 April 2019, two days before the formal dissolution of the league, as "Calgary Inferno Day," and invited the Clarkson Cup winners to the Calgary City Council chambers. Girls Hockey Calgary, the largest girls hockey association in Alberta, announced that they would be able to continue using their Jr. Inferno branding, despite the dissolution of the affiliated CWHL team, the Calgary Inferno.

In August 2019, Hockey Canada announced that they would be increasing the number of senior training camps and exhibition camps during the 2019–20 season, in order to compensate for the loss of ice time ex-CWHL national team players faced.

In October 2019, the players of the 2018 Clarkson Cup-winning Markham Thunder reunited after Chelsea Purcell managed to organize a ceremony to award the players championship rings, the first time in the history of the CWHL such rings had been made.

Several CWHL players were forced into retirement by the collapse of the league, being unable to fit contracts in other leagues or activities with the PWHPA around their working lives outside of hockey. Former Toronto Furies all-star Carlee Campbell stated in January 2020 that "as each day goes by, I get more and more frustrated at the fact that I had to give up playing."

From January to April 2020, the Orillia Museum of Art and History ran an exhibition on the history and issues of women's hockey entitled She Shoots... She Scores!, with curator Heather Price-Jones crediting the CWHL's collapse as an eye-opener that pushed her to take action.

=== Shenzhen KRS Vanke Rays ===
At the end of July 2019, the Shenzhen KRS Vanke Rays announced that they would continue operations, moving to the Russian Zhenskaya Hockey League (ZhHL) and becoming the eighth team in the league. As the only completely independently owned CWHL team and as affiliates of the Kontinental Hockey League's HC Kunlun Red Star, the move was able to proceed without much disruption to club affairs. Shenzhen goaltender Noora Räty opted to continue playing with the team while also serving on the PWHPA board. Several ex-CWHL players spoke positively about increased professionalism in the ZhHL, with Alex Carpenter stating that "When I think of this league, I think of little things that are normal for a professional athlete. But nobody had done them for us in the past, so it doesn't seem normal."

=== #FörFramtiden ===
In August 2019, all 43 players selected to the Swedish national team camp ahead of the Five Nations tournament announced that they would be striking in protest over a lack of support and financial compensation from the Swedish Ice Hockey Association. The strike adopted the named #FörFramtiden (For the Future), with players releasing coordinated social media posts in a similar fashion to the #ForTheGame movement. After several months on strike, the players reached an agreement with the Association, and a year later, the players' union would negotiate the first-ever collective bargaining agreement between the players of the SDHL and the SDHL.

In January 2020, Unionen released their first report on the state of working conditions between professional men's and women's players in Sweden. The report found that the average top flight men's player is paid more than the combined salaries of an entire SDHL club, with only 7% of SDHL players feeling like they could earn a living from hockey and only 27% being satisfied with the conditions they faced in the sport.

=== NWHL/PHF ===
On 2 April 2019, the National Women's Hockey League announced that they would be adding two expansion teams in Toronto and Montreal ahead of the 2019–20 season, citing an increased commitment from the NHL for sponsorship revenue. NHWL Commissioner Dani Rylan stated in a press conference that the league had not been planning to expand, but that they had immediately changed plans after hearing about the CWHL's collapse. But after the launch of the #ForTheGame movement, which including a large number of NWHL players, Kim Pegula announced that she was abandoning her ownership of the Buffalo Beauts, and the New Jersey Devils severed their affiliation with the Metropolitan Riveters. It was also reported that the increased commitment from the NHL only amounted to an extra $50,000, doubling the amount the NWHL received but keeping the total amount the NHL spent on professional women's hockey sponsorships unchanged. By the end of May, less than two months after announcing the plans, the NWHL cancelled its expansion into Canada, but did not rule out the possibility of a future expansion.

In September 2019, the NWHL announced its first ever broadcast deal to include a rights fee, a three-year partnership with Twitch. During the 2019 off-season, the NWHL Players' Association negotiated a new collective bargaining agreement with the NWHL, securing increased benefits for players and a landmark 50/50 split in sponsor revenues between the league and players. When the NWHL announced its plans for a shortened 2020–21 season, held in a bubble during the COVID-19 pandemic, the NWHLPA secured a guarantee that players would receive their full salary, even if they opted-out of playing.

In April 2020, the NWHL announced the awaited arrival of the Toronto Six as its first Canadian expansion team. In 2022, the league would add a second Canadian franchise in the Montreal Force. When the Six were added, owner Johanna Boynton stated that:

"I was influenced a lot by the CWHL folding... I just realized this is a big-picture type of passion of like, how do we do this and get this on a foundation that really can be something of growth and take it to a new level?

In October 2020, the NWHL reorganized its governance structure in the aim of prioritizing independent ownership of teams, creating a Board of Governors along the NHL model, comprising representatives from each team. As part of the reorganization, Rylan stepped down as league commissioner to lead the search for independent ownership of the four league-owned teams. Tyler Tumminia, previously named as chair of the Toronto Six, was named interim commissioner.

The NWHL re-branded as the Premier Hockey Federation (PHF) in 2021, and it persisted in attempting to lure PWHPA players into its fold. However, despite some improvements in conditions, relations with the PWHPA remained strained, and PWHPA members criticized the PHF's approach to organizing and growing the game and rejected overtures at merging. US national captain Hilary Knight, for example, went on the record calling the PHF "a glorified beer league" offering the "illusion of professionalism". However, some PWHPA players expressed less animosity and supported the existence of the PHF, even if they opted not to play in it. Noora Räty drew significant attention in May 2023, when she resigned from the PWHPA board to sign a six-figure contract with the PHF's Riveters. While dozens of PWHPA members would eventually opt to sign in the PHF as the boycott stretched into several years, dozens more remained committed to the PWHPA.

=== COVID-19 pandemic ===
The COVID-19 pandemic hit North America and Europe in early 2020, less than a year after the collapse of the CWHL, and had a significant impact on women's hockey, forcing the cancellation of 2019–20 seasons and disrupting planning for 2020–21 seasons. The impacts of the pandemic, in combination with the continuing fallout from the CWHL's collapse, further multiplied discussions about the future of professional women's hockey. With even major men's leagues struggling to set plans for play during the pandemic and to balance expected losses of revenue, questions of low investments and low media coverage became even more important for the women's game. The pandemic also impacted the ability of players to train, as many already had less access to ice time and training facilities, even when they were part of a formal league. Player salaries were also an issue, with players facing potential loss of both their salary from hockey and their salaries from their full-time jobs outside of hockey. Hefford stated that:

"Women's sport is certainly going to suffer because of this, and simply because I think there was so much momentum in our sport and in others as well. We're still in a place where the investment needs to be made. It's going to be harder and harder to get that investment in the current situation."

=== PWHL ===
The PWHPA initially anticipated that its boycott would last for one season before it would be able to generate the necessary support to form a new professional league. However, the organizing required to achieve the goal of the PWHPA proved to take more than four years, although the most significant development came in 2022 when the PWHPA partnered with Mark Walter and Billie Jean King, whose business enterprises provided the PWHPA with significant financial backing. Understanding that they were getting closer to their goal, the PWHPA organized a formal union, the Professional Women's Hockey League Players Association (PWHLPA), to negotiate a collective agreement (CBA) and foreshadowing the establishment of the new league. The CBA, an eight-year agreement unprecedented in women's professional hockey, was ratified on 2 July, 2023, guaranteeing a minimum salary of $35,000 along with a suite of medical, insurance, and other benefits. At the end of June, while the ratification vote was in progress, Mark Walter Group and BJK Enterprises purchased the PHF with the intent of winding it down and merging it with the new venture. In August, the partners announced the launch of the Professional Women's Hockey League (PWHL) with the intent to begin play in January 2024.

The PWHL announced that the league would comprise six teams in Montreal, Toronto, Ottawa, Boston, New York, and Minnesota. An entry draft was held on 18 September 2023, and training and evaluation camps through November and December. The league launched on New Year's Day 2024.

== See also ==
- Canadian women's ice hockey history
- History of women's ice hockey in the United States
- Misogyny in ice hockey
- Major women's sport leagues in North America
