= Misogyny in ice hockey =

Discrimination against women in ice hockey

The prevalence of misogyny in ice hockey has been a point of discussion. This phenomenon includes issues related to sexism and male chauvinism. The social aspect of the sport supports issues related to misogyny, homophobia, xenophobia, and heteronormativity. The subject has been extensively discussed in both media and academia, with many women in the sport increasingly speaking out about the extent of misogyny in hockey and its negative impact on the sport.

== History ==
=== Late 1800s to middle 1900s ===
The first record of an organized women's team reports one formed at Queen's University in Kingston, Ontario. The group dubbed themselves the Love-Me-Littles after being shunned by the community, the school's archbishop declaring that young women should not be playing hockey.

As World War I hit in the 1910s, women's hockey began a marked period of growth, with tournaments at the Jubilee Arena routinely selling out while the men were off at war. One of the game's star players, Albertine Lapensée, was routinely accused of being a man. Lapensée left the sport after asking for a share of the profits her team was generating. When American investors attempted to organise an All-Star Team to tour the United States, they were forced to drop their bid after the Montreal Star newspaper ran a campaign against it, declaring that any woman who participated in the tour would lose their virtue. After the war ended, investment and media coverage disappeared. In 1923, the Canadian Amateur Hockey Association voted not to give women official recognition as hockey players. In the United States, women's hockey began a period of marked growth during World War I and the immediate afterwar years,. However, the sport underwent a significant decline by the mid-1920s, in the midst of the post-war backlash against the wartime gains in women's rights, including increasing arguments that professional sports were dangerous to women's morals. Club and arena owners also shifted their promotion of hockey towards what they believed would be a more profitable image of masculine "blood and mayhem."

During the Great Depression in Canada, the Ladies Ontario Hockey Association experienced a heavy decline for various reasons, including increasing competition for ice time. Its most successful team, the Preston Rivulettes, which still drew substantial audiences, were forced to fold as Second World War hit. The military pressured the facilities and the league failed to receive the same support as the men's leagues. The men's leagues were deemed to be morale boosters.

Abby Hoffman, born in 1947, became an all-star defender in an Ontario boys' league in Canada in the 1950s. Her parents concealed her sex and placed her on a boys team due to the fact that there were not any local girls hockey teams. One report stated that when her sex was discovered, "people were incredulous. They couldn’t believe it. Most people assumed that no girl would want to play."

=== Middle to late 1900s ===
Women's hockey began to re-form more formal structures in the second half of the 20th century. The first women's ice hockey program in the United States was established at Brown University in 1965. In 1969, Modo AIK faced off against Timrå IK in the first organized women's hockey match in Sweden. National associations continued to ignore the need to develop the women's game model, assuming a lack of interest among the female population compared to the male side, and as a consequence often imposed a wide variety of differing local rules, making international competition difficult to organize. Canada's Fran Rider, who was one of the founders of the Ontario Women's Hockey Association observed:

"It is important to understand that support from the minor hockey community did not exist for females, so any progress was in spite of discouragement by male hockey. We had to deal with problems like bad ice, few leagues and no support systems."

By the mid-1980s, the International Ice Hockey Federation (IIHF) was coming under substantial pressure to formally codify a consistent set of rules and structures for the women's game but failed to do so, leading to calls for the formation of a separate women's international ice hockey federation. However, International Olympic Committee president Juan Antonio Samaranch informed the IIHF that the IOC would not communicate with separate federations. Within a decade, the 1990 IIHF Women's World Championship was organized and hosted in Ottawa, Canada, and became the first IIHF-sanctioned international tournament in women's ice hockey, 70 years after the first men's World Championship was held. The tournament suffered a number of issues, including Fran Rider organizing the tournament without financial support from the Canadian Amateur Hockey Association and Team Canada wearing infamous pink jerseys as a marketing decision. The location of the tournament was chosen five months before it started, and priority for ice-time was given to the junior men's Ottawa 67s team, meaning that the sale of tickets only began a few weeks before the start of the championship.

In 1998, women's ice hockey was added to the Winter Olympics. In 2001, women's hockey became an NCAA-sanctioned sport for the first time, with the launch of the NCAA Women's Ice Hockey Tournament.

=== 21st century ===
==== United States ====
In March 2017, the players of the United States women's national ice hockey team announced their intention to strike ahead of the 2017 IIHF Women's World Championship, after over a year of failed negotiations with USA Hockey concerning wages and playing conditions. At the time, USA Hockey was spending an estimated 3.5 million dollars a year on youth development programs for boys, but was not making any expenditures which would help development programs for girls.

The US men's team won gold at the 2026 Winter Olympics during their overtime match against Canada. This was the men's first Olympic gold since the Miracle on Ice game in the 1980 Olympics, compared to the women's team third gold medal since their inclusion in the games in 1998. After the game, videos and photos of the team celebrating with FBI director Kash Patel were posted to social media, including a video of the team on a call with President Donald Trump, who invited the team to the State of the Union and the White House before stating: "We are going to have to bring the women's team, you do know that. I do believe I probably would be impeached", referring to inviting the Women's Olympic hockey team, who had won gold earlier in the week. While the majority of the men's team cheered and laughed at this statement, one player can be heard shouting "absolutely", with another chanting "two for two", referencing the men and women's teams gold medals.

The majority of the team's reactions sparked online conversations about sexism within the ice hockey community and from Trump. The women's team declined the invitation to attend the State of the Union. A petition signed by over 20,000 individuals was created shortly after the video of the call was posted, with the petition calling for the men's team to apologize for laughing at both the women's team and at Trump's comments, while urging players to skip the State of the Union address. When asked about the comments made by Trump and the men's national team's reaction, women's team captain Hilary Knight called it a "distasteful joke" and said that it overshadowed the US women's success and other Olympic women who had medaled more frequently then male athletes. While Knight echoed statements made by men's team members such as Jack Hughes about the camaraderie between the teams, she commented that the incident provided a potential educational moment for how women's sports teams are discussed in the media.

==== Sweden ====
In May 2017, IF Sundsvall Hockey cut its women's team, who were playing at the top level of Swedish women's hockey, citing a need to save money for its third-tier men's side. The club was criticized for the decision, with forward Mathilda Gustafsson stating:

If we were a company instead of an association, you would never shut down a department which only employed women because the cost inhibits the male employees.

In August 2019, the players of the Sweden women's national ice hockey team went on strike over the lack of financial support and poor conditions they faced from the Swedish Ice Hockey Association.

==== Canada ====
After the collapse of the Canadian Women's Hockey League in May 2019, over 200 players announced their intentions to sit out from any professional leagues in the hopes of securing greater investment and media coverage of the sport. The #ForTheGame movement soon became more formally organised in the form of the Professional Women's Hockey Players Association.

In February 2019, the University of British Columbia changed its policy of giving its men's hockey team preference in scheduling matches after complaints from players on the women's team, who had a better record than the men's team at the time.

In March 2019, a girls peewee team in Mauricie, in Québec, made it to the finals of the boys' regional finals before being kicked out of the tournament and being forced to cede their place in the finals to the boys' team they had defeated in the semi-finals.

In 2019 Hockey Canada instituted a new bylaw requiring its five-member board of directors to have at least two men and two women in order to improve representation on the board.

== Sex crimes and sexual harassment ==
=== 1980s ===
In 1989, Brian Sakic and Wade Smith, who had just won the Memorial Cup with the Swift Current Broncos, were arrested after a 17-year-old girl alleged they raped her after she invited them to her parents' apartment to watch television. Sakic and Smith were eventually traded away to the Tri-City Americans in Washington and were cleared of the charges. Meanwhile, the complainant was charged with mischief, an offense she was later acquitted of. In his ruling, the judge who acquitted the complainant described the events that took place at the apartment as "degrading and disgusting by any reasonable person's standards", and that, from his perspective, the young woman "honestly believed what had happened to her…was not by consent." Sakic was drafted by the Washington Capitals in 1990. Attempts by representatives of the complainant to investigate the Justice Department's decision to drop the charges against the players and to charge the alleged victim were unsuccessful.

=== 1990s ===
In 1990, Dino Ciccarelli, Geoff Courtnall, Neil Sheehy, and Scott Stevens of the Washington Capitals were accused of sexually assaulting a 17-year old girl in a limousine. Nick Kypreos told investigators that he had initially stepped into the limousine before the alleged assault took place, but left when he saw the complainant struggling with the players. Kypreos later said this account was inaccurate and that he "saw no indication that the girl was being forced to do anything against her will". A grand jury declined to charge the players, who were released from the Capitals roster.

In 1991, NHL team owner Marcel Aubut of the Quebec Nordiques made rude and sexually charged comments in French about the mother of his team's number one draft pick, not knowing that she was bilingual and could understand him. This, and other incidents, eventually led to what is known as the Eric Lindros trade. Skater and eventual Hockey Hall of Fame member Eric Lindros had been selected first overall by the Nordiques in the 1991 NHL entry draft, even though Lindros had signaled in advance that he would never play for them, citing the ownership. In a 2016 interview, Lindros revealed that this decision was based entirely on the behavior of Aubut, explaining, "The decision to not play for Quebec was based solely on the owner. It had nothing to do with language, culture, [or] city. Keep in mind, my wife is French [from Quebec]. I was not going to play for that individual – period." More than two decades later, Aubut was forced to resign his positions as President of the Canadian Olympic Committee and Chair of the Canadian Olympic Foundation after multiple credible allegations of sexual harassment were made against him, with a retired Quebec Superior Court justice brought in to investigate.

In 1992, three Guelph Storm players were charged with sexual assault after a 16-year-old girl told police she was forced to have sex with them at the team's season-ending party. The charges were dropped on the eve of the players' trial, with prosecution citing a lack of evidence beyond a reasonable doubt.

On March 30, 1994, ECHL player Billy Tibbetts pleaded guilty to raping a 15-year-old girl when he was 17 years old at an outdoor drinking party in Massachusetts. In 1995, while on probation for the statutory rape case, Tibbetts was convicted of assault and battery with a dangerous weapon (a BB gun), disorderly conduct and witness intimidation, and served 39 months in prison. In 2000, he signed an NHL contract with the Pittsburgh Penguins.

In 1995, Ed Jovanovski, Cory Evans, and Bill Bowler of the Windsor Spitfires were charged with two counts each of sexual assault after a 24-year-old woman told police that she was assaulted in her apartment and forced to have anal intercourse with the players. All charges were ultimately dropped due to a lack of convincing evidence. Two of the accused players counter-sued the complainant for defamation, though the suit was dropped after the sexual assault charges were withdrawn. Jovanovski, who was selected first overall in the previous season's NHL draft, continued his playing career and signed with the Florida Panthers.

That same year, five members of the Saskatoon Blades were alleged to have sexually assaulted a 16-year-old girl who was unconscious at a house party. Ultimately, the charges against the players were dismissed.

=== 2000s ===
In 2000, three Barrie Colts players were charged with the sexual assault of a 16-year-old girl. Those charges were withdrawn several months later, with prosecution citing no reasonable prospect of conviction.

=== 2010s ===
In February 2012, Boston University called for the creation of a task force to investigate the "culture and climate" of the men's hockey team after two players were charged with sexual assault. Corey Trivino was charged with assault with intent to commit rape and ultimately pleaded guilty to the lesser charge of assault and battery, while Max Nicastro was cleared of charges on grounds of insufficient evidence. The task force's findings reported that a "culture of sexual entitlement and abuse" existed on the team, with some panel interviewees saying that some BU players gave "the perception that they need not seek consent for sexual contact". The findings resulted in team coach Jack Parker being stripped of his title as executive athletic director; however, Parker kept his coaching duties until his retirement the following year.

In August 2012, Nick Cousins, Andrew Fritsch and Mark Petaccio of the Sault Ste. Marie Greyhounds were charged with sexual assault. However, the charges were withdrawn in April 2013 by the Crown Attorney's Office, which, after reviewing the evidence provided, found "no reasonable prospect of conviction." Attorneys and detectives familiar with the case said that a series of photographs which depicted the complainant participating in a sexual act with more than one player present affected the Crown's chances for conviction. Former Sault Ste. Marie Crown Attorney Bill Johnson explained, "Even if [the woman] didn't want it to happen, the photograph raised the issue of whether you could prove lack of consent".

In March 2013, Windsor Spitfires player and New Jersey Devils prospect Ben Johnson was charged with the rape of a 16-year-old girl in the washroom of a Windsor nightclub during the Spitfires' end-of-season celebration. On September 1, 2016, he was formally convicted on the charge. The Devils, who had signed Johnson to an entry-level contract in 2014, terminated his contract the same day. In November 2015, Johnson was acquitted of a separate sexual assault charge, with the judge finding that the use of force in that case was not proven beyond a reasonable doubt. On October 25, 2016, he was sentenced to a 3-year prison term. Johnson served one month in jail at Windsor and 12 months in a prison in Kingston, Ontario.

In March 2014, the University of Ottawa suspended its men's hockey programme after multiple players were accused of sexual assault. In November 2014, the OHL suspended two players for 15 games after the players had made a number of misogynistic comments on social media.

In March 2015, Ohio State University forced women's hockey head coach Nate Handrahan to resign after being investigated for sexually harassing players.

In 2017, Chance A. Macdonald of the Gananoque Islanders pleaded guilty in Kingston's Ontario Court of Justice to a single count of common assault committed against a 16-year-old girl in the fall of 2015. The girl claimed she and female friends were invited to a party to welcome Islanders rookies, and that the party escalated to the degree that multiple players chased the girls throughout the house, with Macdonald at one point holding the complainant by force while he assaulted her. Macdonald was charged with sexual assault but was permitted to take a plea deal to assault. Macdonald, then a student at Queen's University in Kingston, was sentenced to 88 days in jail, to be served on weekends after his internship tied to his bachelor's degree had ended. Justice Allan Letourneau, the presiding judge, reportedly told Macdonald, "I played extremely high-end hockey and I know the mob mentality that can exist in that atmosphere."

=== 2020s ===
In March 2020, Alyssa Wruble, while playing on the Northampton Area High School hockey team, was bullied over being the only girl on the team, with numerous fans holding up signs and chanting for her to reveal her gender and saying that she had a penis. The Parkland Ice Hockey president Mike Byelick stepped down from his position due to the incident.

In May of that year, the Washington Capitals placed Brendan Leipsic on waivers after leaked messages from his private social media conversations showed him making misogynistic comments about women, including other players' wives and girlfriends. Leipsic's brother Jeremy, who was also involved in the conversations, was terminated from the University of Manitoba's hockey team.

Amid the COVID-19 pandemic, the IIHF cancelled the 2021 IIHF World Women's U18 Championship, but proceeded with the boys' 2021 World Junior Ice Hockey Championships. The IIHF was criticised by several for the decision, with U18 Team Canada player Jade Maisonneuve stating that "COVID doesn't exactly discriminate... I understand why the women's tournament was cancelled, but why both weren't is a little questionable."

In November 2020, Jarrod Skalde, assistant coach of the Wilkes-Barre/Scranton Penguins alleged that head coach Clark Donatelli sexually assaulted his wife. In a lawsuit, Skalde claimed Bill Guerin, the general manager of the Wilkes-Barre/Scranton Penguins, covered up the assault by telling Skalde to "stay quiet" about it. Guerin denied any wrongdoing on his part and claimed that he reported the assault allegation to senior management of the team's NHL affiliate, the Pittsburgh Penguins. The lawsuit was settled in November 2021. Guerin was later cleared of wrongdoing by an NHL internal investigation, though a separate investigation into his actions by the United States Center for SafeSport remains ongoing.

In 2021, while on loan to a Swedish hockey club during the 2020–21 OHL season, Logan Mailloux was criminally convicted in Sweden for photographing a woman during sex and then circulating the pictures to his teenage teammates without her consent. Despite the charge, the Montreal Canadiens went on to draft Mailloux with their first-round selection. The decision to draft Mailloux was criticized by Canadian Prime Minister Justin Trudeau, who said he was "deeply disappointed" by the team and described the selection as demonstrating a lack of judgment.

In January 2022, former NHL player Reid Boucher pleaded guilty to sexually assaulting a minor on two separate occasions in 2011; at the time of the incident, the minor was 12 years old while Boucher was 17.

Jake Virtanen was charged with sexual assault in January 2022 following an investigation by the Vancouver Police Department. The incident allegedly occurred in September of 2017. On July 26, 2022, Virtanen was cleared of all charges by a jury. During the trial, Virtanen said he believed he had the complainant's consent, but the complainant testified she tried to resist his advances. The defence argued the complainant did not do enough to say "no".

That same month, an investigation into an alleged sexual assault said to have occurred after the 2018 IIHF World Junior Championship revealed that Hockey Canada, which handles multiple sexual assault allegations per year, diverts a portion of player registration fees to a special fund worth approximately $15 million to "pay out settlements in cases of alleged sexual assault without its insurance company, and with minimal outside scrutiny". In federal hearings that month, Hockey Canada explained that from 1989 to 2022 it helped settle 21 cases, paying nearly C$9 million. Amid "growing calls for a leadership overhaul to address the troubling culture" in hockey, the organization's CEO Scott Smith said he had no plans to resign. In October of that year, Smith and the entire board of directors resigned. They were subsequently replaced by an all-new board.

The public outcry surrounding the Hockey Canada scandal led to the reopening of a case from 2003 involving allegations of a group sexual assault by members of the World Junior Canadian hockey team. An anonymous source contacted Canadian MP John Nater, alleging that multiple players on the 2003 World Junior team were recorded having sex with a non-responsive woman. The Sports Network corroborated the source's account of the events with two additional sources, including the owner of the video camera used to film the alleged incident. Jordin Tootoo and Nathan Paetsch, members of the 2003 team, denied any involvement and supported a full investigation into the allegations. Hockey Canada hired Jennifer White, a lawyer and investigator, as a third party investigator to look into the allegations in 2022. As of 2026, the investigation is ongoing and no charges have been filed. In addition, the 2022 Hockey Canada federal hearings led the Quebec City police department to reopen their investigation into an alleged group sexual assault in 2014 involving the Gatineau Olympiques.

In October 2023, Massimo Siciliano and Nicolas Daigle of the Victoriaville Tigres pleaded guilty to sexually assaulting a 17-year-old girl in Quebec City in 2021. Daigle also pleaded guilty to two charges of filming and sharing a video of the assault with his coach and teammates. Upon learning of the video, a Tigres employee reportedly told Daigle to delete it. In July 2024, both players were sentenced to roughly two-and-a-half years each in prison.

In October 2024, the CTV news program W5 reported on allegations of a group sexual assault involving eight former Ontario Hockey League players in 2014. The complainant, then 22 years old, was in a relationship with a 19-year-old Mississauga Steelheads player. The woman alleged that an encounter with her boyfriend that began as a consensual act turned into a group assault involving eight players ranging from ages 16 to 19. In March 2025, Peel Regional Police confirmed they were investigating these allegations.

That same month, a lawsuit was filed against four Windsor Spitfires players for a group sexual assault at an end-of-season party in 1984. The suit claims that a fifth player was "standing in the corner … crying throughout the remainder of the [alleged] assaults".

In April 2025, The Athletic reported that the New York Rangers retained a law firm in 2024 to investigate a former team employee's allegation that Artemi Panarin sexually assaulted her. Panarin and Madison Square Garden Sports, which owns the Rangers, paid settlements to the former employee without an admission of wrongdoing.

== Hockey Hall of Fame ==
In 2010, Cammi Granato and Angela James became the first two women to be inducted into the Hockey Hall of Fame as players. The Hall of Fame, however, introduced a rule at the same time limiting the number of women who could be inducted each year to two, and as of 2020 has only inducted six other women (and 36 men) leading to accusations of sexism, male chauvinism, and misogyny.

After scoring the Clarkson Cup–winning goal in 2015, Boston Blades forward Janine Weber was asked by the Hall to donate the stick she had scored with, however it was one of only two sticks she had. She was forced to reach out via Twitter to organise a sponsorship for herself to replace the stick she had donated.

In January 2019, the Hall of Fame was criticised for the disparity between the baby clothes in their gift shop, with the boys' clothes proclaiming "Future hockey legend" and the girls' clothes proclaiming "Cutie".

== Discrimination lawsuits ==
=== Canada ===
In 1981, Justine Blainey-Broker, born in 1973, won a roster position on a boys' team in the Metro Toronto Hockey League, was barred from playing by the league when she was 13 years of age because of her sex since ice hockey was now divided by male and female categories of the sport. Her discrimination complaint against the team was ultimately successful when it reached the Ontario Court of Appeal in 1986.

In 2000, a group of women filed a complaint against the University of Saskatchewan under the Saskatchewan Human Rights Code for giving the university's men's hockey team preferential treatment. The university lost the case.

After the University of New Brunswick downgraded the status of their varsity women's hockey programme in 2008 and stripped it of its funding, players on the team filed a discrimination complaint with the province's Labour and Employment Board. After the board ruled in the players' favour, the university reinstated the programme in 2017.

=== United States ===
In 2015, former Olympian Shannon Miller sued the University of Minnesota for discrimination after she was fired. The university had cited the need to cut costs behind the decision to fire her, yet did not fire the men's hockey program head coach, despite him having a higher salary and a substantially less successful record. In 2018, she won the case and was awarded $3.7 million in damages.

In June 2018, 11 former University of North Dakota women's players sued the university over the decision to axe the women's hockey program in 2017, alleging that the university failed to meet its Title IX requirements to effectively accommodate student interests and abilities.

== National Hockey League (NHL) ==
In August 2014, the Chicago Blackhawks announced that they stop playing "The Stripper" in between periods following a fan petition. Early that year, the team had been criticised for displays of sexism at the Blackhawks Convention, with the moderator, Mark Giangreco, focusing on the attractiveness of captain Jonathan Toews's partner instead of his trophy awards.

In April 2015, NHL commissioner Gary Bettman defended the use of chants by spectators comparing Anaheim Ducks forward Corey Perry to Katy Perry. The chants had been criticised as being sexist for attempting to degrade Perry by calling him a woman, especially since there had been previous similar incidents, such as calling Sidney Crosby "Princess Crosby". EA Sports' NHL 15 video game was criticised sexist portrayals of women hockey fans in its marketing for the game.

By mid-2019 less than 5% of hockey operations jobs in the NHL were held by women. In March 2019, the NHL and the NHLPA established a Female Hockey Advisory Committee to try and increased opportunities for women in the sport.

In April 2020, a former Tampa Bay Lightning youth hockey coach sued the team, alleging that she was fired after filing a complaint over being sexually assaulted by a team executive. Later that year, the Los Angeles Kings suspended their senior manager of game presentation and events after he was sued by a former Kings employee for sexual harassment. In November 2020, Jarrod Skalde sued the Pittsburgh Penguins, accusing the team of covering up sexual assaults committed by Clark Donatelli, the head coach of the team's AHL affiliate.

=== Lack of official domestic violence policy ===
The NHL is currently the only one of the big four men's professional sports leagues in North America not to have an official policy on domestic violence. Players accused or convicted of domestic violence may still be subject to league suspension if the NHL concludes that their suspension improves the reputation and/or interests of the league. Since 2016, league players have also been mandated to receive anti-sexual assault and domestic violence training.

=== Ice Girls ===
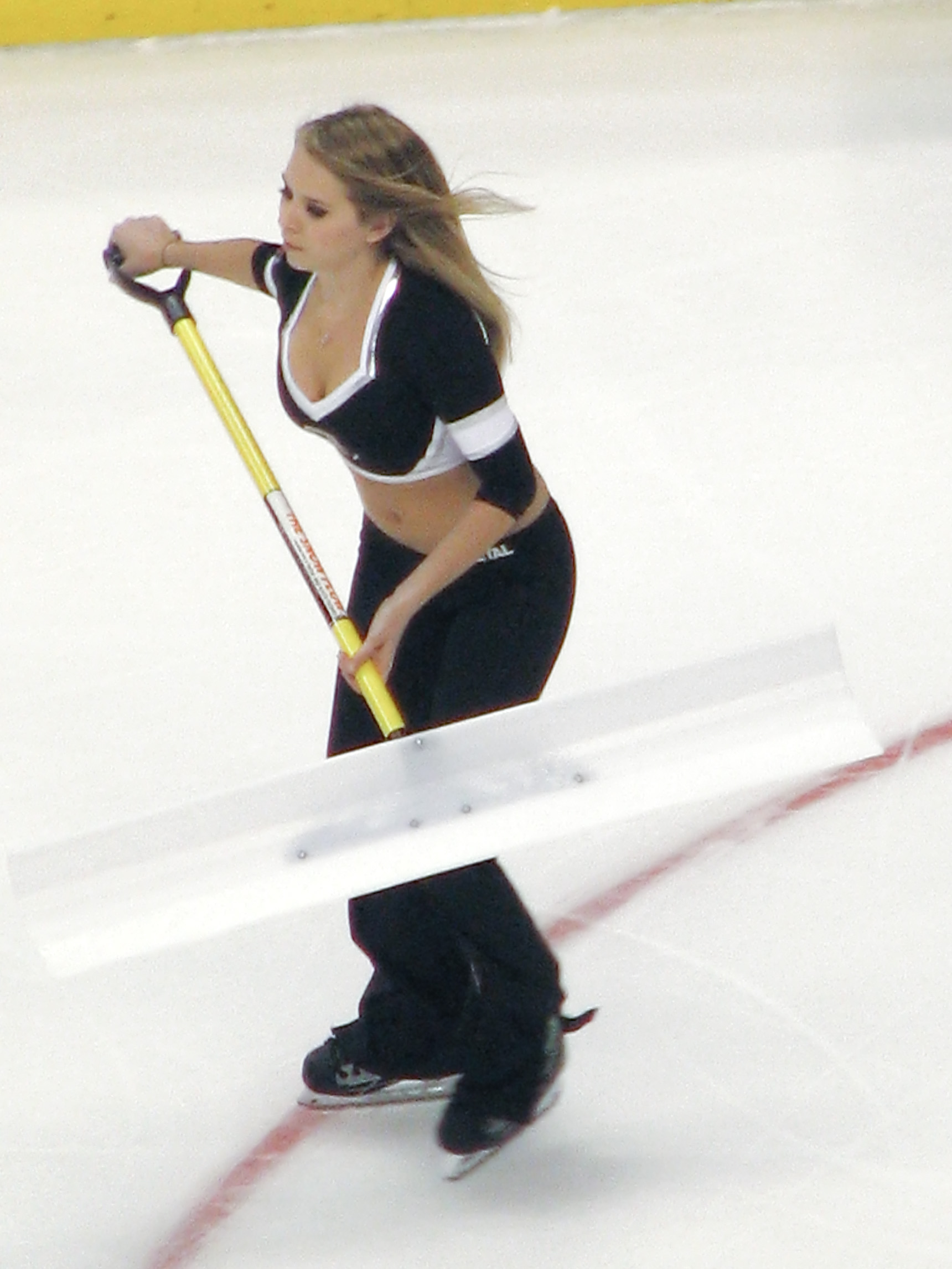
The revealing nature of the uniforms worn by Ice Girls, such as this Los Angeles Kings Ice Girl from 2008, has drawn criticism.

Several NHL teams have come under criticism for the use of cheerleading teams known as Ice Girls, consisting of young women wearing revealing uniforms. The practice has been criticised as objectifying and for poor working conditions faced by the women.

The first Ice Girls squad had been introduced by the New York Islanders in the 2001–02 season. In 2007, the New York Rangers stopped using Ice Girls after a lawsuit by a former Ice Girl accusing team officials of sexual harassment. In 2014, the Philadelphia Flyers temporarily stopped the practice after complaints of poor working conditions, including having to work outdoors in sub-zero temperatures in shorts and being forced to spend hundreds of dollars a month out of their own pocket on cosmetics. The Flyers re-introduced the squads after the replacement ice-cleaning workers were booed by fans. Later in 2014, the San Jose Sharks introduced Ice Girl squads, despite a fan petition gathering hundreds of signatures. In 2015, the Islanders stopped the practice after changing arenas.

Multiple NHL teams have defended the practice, with the Colorado Avalanche stating in 2014 that "It's what every college in the country does. It's what every NBA team in the country does. It's what every lacrosse team in the country does."

=== NHL relations with women's hockey ===
The league has received criticism for exhibiting a lack of initiative to support professional women's hockey on a more than superficial level. In 2019, the league donated only $100,000 to the NWHL, despite the average NHL team making a $25 million profit that year, and has owned a trademark for the name "Women's National Hockey League" (WNHL) since at least 2012 without making any moves to create such a league. After the collapse of the Canadian Women's Hockey League (CWHL), both the Buffalo Sabres and New Jersey Devils severed their affiliations with the local National Women's Hockey League (NWHL) teams. The league did, however, contribute some money to helping the CWHL pay off its debts.

A couple of weeks before the 2015 NHL Winter Classic, the NHL announced that a showcase game between the Canadian Women's Hockey League's Candiennes de Montréal, and the National Women's Hockey League's, the Boston Pride, would be held before the event. The game was marked by several controversies, including potentially sub-standard ice as the game was held directly after the NHL's teams' practice, a lack of publicity, and no broadcasting or streaming options available for fans to watch the games.

In 2019, the NHL was criticized after it emerged that the league would not be paying Brianna Decker for her demonstration of the passing accuracy skills competition, despite fans unofficially clocking her time as three seconds faster than the competition's winner Leon Draisaitl. After company CCM Hockey pledged to pay her an equal amount to what Draisaitl won, the NHL announced that it had clocked her time as six seconds longer than his and would be donating $25 000 to a charity of Decker's choice.

The league expanded women's participation in the 2020 All-Star game, and announced it would be paying the players an appearance fee and making a donation towards girls' hockey, but would not be offering prize money.

=== Goaltenders ===
In 1992, Manon Rhéaume became the first woman to attend an NHL training camp and suited up for the Tampa Bay Lightning in a pre-season game. Despite asking to be treated the same as the men's players, she was forced to use a separate dressing room. Then Lightning president and general manager, Phil Esposito, stated: "I don't care what anybody thinks, I'd be a liar if I said I wasn't using it for the publicity. The fact is, if I could put a horse in net—if it could stand on skates and stop the puck—I'd do it."

== Women's involvement in hockey ==
=== As players ===
A regularly cited barrier women face in hockey is the lack of youth teams and development resources. Cases exist where girls have tried to join high-performance boys' teams only to find themselves being cut, a decision they believed to be made due to their sex.

==== Stereotypes about female players ====
There are a number of persistent stereotypes surrounding women in hockey, such as players being perceived as too masculine, with players facing pressure to take on a more feminine appearance. Ed Snider Youth Hockey Foundation coach Nora Cothren has also stated that "the presence of homophobia in women's sports is different than that in men's sports. There is a fear among female athletes that if they speak up about gay issues, they will be automatically lumped into the stereotype of gay female athlete."

Women are also frequently stereotyped as being inherently less physically capable of high-level athletic performance. However, Umeå University professor Kajsa Gilenstam found in her doctoral thesis that the poor quality of equipment female hockey players had to use significantly impacted performance: "nine out of ten female players increased puck velocity when a more flexible stick and a lighter puck were used." Further research by Gilenstam has suggested "a similar capacity of producing strength and aerobic power in female and male hockey players."

=== As coaches ===
While many women have played professional women's ice hockey, women have experienced barriers to success in finding coaching positions in the men's game. In 2016, Dawn Braid became the first woman to hold a full-time NHL coaching position, being named a skating coach for the Arizona Coyotes. In April 2020, former Swiss Olympian Florence Schelling became the first woman to be named general manager of a top-flight professional men's team when she named as SC Bern GM. Ahead of the 2020–21 season, only two of the six NWHL head coaches were women.

Former Russian player Alexandra Kapustina has stated that: "A man with no hockey experience at all stood more chance of getting a coaching role than I did, despite my vast background in women’s hockey and my coaching certificates. All those efforts crashed into a barrier of sexism."

A 2016 study of Albertan girls' hockey found that it was commonly assumed that fathers would volunteer for coaching roles and that teams rarely attempted to communicate with or retain women as coaches. A 2015 analysis of Minnesota girls' hockey found that only 21% of teams were led by a female head coach, an increase from 0 in 2008.

Ahead of the 2012-13 NCAA women's Division I season, only 8 out of the 36 teams had women as head coaches.

=== As officials ===
As of 2019, there were only 2,000 women among the 31,000 hockey officials registered in Canada and only 1,500 among the 25,000 registered in the United States. In 2019, the first woman officiated at the NHL pre-training camp prospects tournament level.

During the 2018–19 season, Cassandra Gregory was due to be the first female official in the Alberta Junior Hockey League after being recommended by the regional refereeing committee, however the league did not assign her to any games. Under the Hockey Canada referee qualifications system, women cannot reach Level 6, while men can. In 2019, Charlotte Girard, who had served as an official at the Olympic level and in the Ligue Magnus, the top tier of French men's hockey, spoke out about the abuse she had faced in the sport, including being physically attacked in pre-match warmups and being left out of communications between other officials.

A 2019 thesis from a graduate student at the University of Toronto found that "women officials across Canada experience abusive behaviour, and believe that discrimination prevents them from advancing to higher levels of officiating."

=== As fans ===
A "puck bunny" is defined as a female ice hockey fan whose interest in the sport is primarily motivated by sexual attraction to the players rather than enjoyment of the game itself. The stereotype is often criticized as being derogatory towards female fans, both by objectifying them and branding them as inauthentic. The stereotype runs into and overlaps with the prevailing idea that the majority of female fans at games are less knowledgeable about the game than male fans. However the idea has not been backed up by evidence. Concerns about the sexualization of the players has increased in the 2020s, with the rise of female fans that are labeled as fans of BookTok or queer hockey romance show Heated Rivalry, who at times call the rink a "boy aquarium" and display signs at games, which at times can be sexual such as the sign of “Will and Mack 2 man” referencing San Jose Sharks players. Additionally, Seattle Kraken center Alex Wennberg and his wife Felicia spoke out about some members of the BookTok community, that while they support female empowerment some of the comments and videos had crossed lines and came off as more exploitative and predatory.

Professional hockey leagues have been criticised for reducing women to stereotypes in marketing and merchandise, such as the overuse of the colour pink in creating merchandise for women and gender disparities in the slogans. In 2018, Walmart and sports apparel company Sauce Hockey received complaints when the latter's line of women's t-shirts made it onto Walmart's website via a third-party seller; the shirts came with graphic descriptions of women as groupies for hockey players. In 2025, Canadian apparel company HockeyBenders was criticized for selling t-shirts and hoodies with demeaning messaging about women. It subsequently pulled the product line in question from its website.

After the release of Heated Rivalry there was a spike of interest in the sport and an increase in women hockey fans, for both male and female leagues. Following the aftermath of the US men's ice hockey win during the 2026 Winter Olympics there was a surge of fans posting about their experiences of misogyny and exclusion in the sport.

== Issues ==
Women who are hockey fans often face harassment targeted at their sex and/or gender appearance both at sporting events and online.⁣

In 2017, HockeySverige performed a series of interviews on sexism in the sport with top players in Sweden, including several players speaking anonymously about being sexually harassed by men in the sport. Swedish national team defender Johanna Fällman stated that "It feels like hockey is several steps behind the rest of society in Sweden." A 2018 investigation by SVT Sport found that 9 out 10 girls youth players in the Västergötland region experience degrading and sexist comments.

The barriers facing women in ice hockey can also vary from region to region, with women in more conservative regions often having higher barriers to participation. Women of colour often face increased discrimination and barriers in the sport, with feminism in ice hockey having faced criticism for its lack of intersectionality.

Hockey has been widely accused of a culture of conformity, presenting an additional barrier to attempts to speak out about and change issues in the sport. It has also been suggested that the importance of the sport within Canadian culture has hindered scrutiny of the sport's issues.

=== Rape culture ===
There has been extensive discussion surrounding the widespread presence of rape culture in hockey as an issue affecting both sexes and different genders, especially in boys' junior hockey. A number of major incidents can be found on record involving players who have been charged for sexual assault during the 2000 era with testimonies from multiple former players discussing locker room cultures that degrade players and promote the objectification of women. There have also been multiple junior boy's teams involved in serious hazing incidents. In locker room slang, sexual conquests are commonly referred to as "kills".

A 2012 report by a Boston University task force following two incidents of players being charged with sexual assault found that a culture of "sexual entitlement" and alcohol abuse existed in the men's hockey programme. In 2014, Vice reported on "The Junior Hockey Bible", an online publication about junior hockey players' experiences which circulated amongst the community as a series of email chains starting from the early 2000s. The document contained a large number of degrading slang terms for women and sexual acts to be performed on them, with Vice describing it as a "sexual assault guide book". The Bible also included information for players on how to guard against assault accusations by hiding incriminating evidence.

A 2014 study from Lakehead University found that social problems in hockey "include, but are not limited to: extreme violence resulting in injuries and death, hazing rituals, multiple types of sexual violence, drug abuse, financial corruption, as well as various forms of prejudice and discrimination." A 2020 study from Sweden found that "Identified as components of the ice hockey culture and ‘natural’ parts of the game and community, rules that trigger fights, harsh and careless playing styles, a normalising of sexist and derogatory attitudes/language and an exaggerated alcohol consumption."

In November 2018, former NHLer Daniel Carcillo indicated that as a rookie of the 2002-03 Sarnia Sting, he and other rookies were subjected to several forms of severe hazing, which crossed over into physical and sexual assault. The accusations were corroborated by several other former Sting teammates, and a class-action lawsuit was launched. In December 2020, a large number of testimonies by former OHL players were filed to the Ontario Superior Court, detailing accounts of physical, psychological, and sexual abuse.

=== Lack of investment ===
Another regularly cited barrier is the lack of investment in professional women's leagues. Even in European leagues such as the Swedish Women's Hockey League (SDHL), where women's teams are part of the same organization as the men's teams, concerns about access to resources are widespread. Calls to invest in women's leagues are often dismissed as charity or as leagues not being able to prove themselves, despite the fact that men's leagues have often received large public subsidies to stay afloat. Some studies have found that women's sports receive less than 5% of all commercial investment in sports, despite having significant and significantly growing reach.

=== Pay gap ===
Player salaries in professional women's hockey leagues are often extremely low even in the most elite leagues and have mostly been a recent development in the sport. The National Women's Hockey League (now renamed the Premier Hockey Federation) became the first league to offer a salary to all its players when it formed in 2015, but cut those salaries in half after only a year. In both the former NWHL and the now-defunct Canadian Women's Hockey League (CWHL), the highest-paid players received around $10,000 per year.

A Unionen report released in January 2020 found that the average top-flight men's hockey player in Sweden earns more than the combined salaries for an entire top-flight women's team, with the average Swedish Hockey League (SHL) player earning 121 000 kr a month and the average Swedish Women's Hockey League (SDHL) player earning less than 5500kr a month. The report further found that 99% of the SHL players felt they were able to earn a living playing hockey, while only 7% of the SDHL players felt the same. The report also examined the resources available to players, finding that 91% of men's players had access to team doctors compared to 29% of women, and that 83% of the men were satisfied with the conditions they faced in hockey, while only 27% of the women were.

The low salaries force players to hold second full-time jobs, contributing to high levels of stress and burnout. A 2019 Hockey Sverige analysis found that of all 180 Swedish players playing in the SDHL in the 2014–15 season, over 100 had retired by 2019. In July 2020 Swedish national team player Fanny Rask announced her retirement from hockey via an Instagram post in which she voiced her frustration with the pace of professionalization in women's hockey and her exhaustion with the financial insecurity of being an SDHL player.

What I dreamed of in my youth was to become a professional [ice hockey player]. That the [women's] league would grow to such an extent that we could live on hockey. (No, not millions, everyone knows it is unreasonable still.) But I have always thought that I would be able to join-in when we become professionals. But it has not happened and I feel that we are at a standstill... And I do not see that there will be any change. Of course, I know that things are happening but for me it is going too slowly and I am incredibly uncertain that it will ever happen... So maybe I chose the wrong path, had the wrong dream and too high of demands. I hope there are some people who still have the strength to carry on and who work for a future for women's hockey. My energy has run out, I'm empty and I'm sorry.

The lack of opportunities to make a living while playing the game also has the effect of driving young girls out of the sport, as they will not see any future in the sport.

=== Media coverage ===
The lack of media coverage of professional women's leagues is regularly cited as a major in the absence of women in hockey and as a major obstacle to the growth of professional women's hockey. Academic research has indicated that women's sports receives less than 4% of all sports media coverage, despite the fact that over 30% of all athletes are women. Media coverage of women's hockey events has also tended to be of poor quality, with low definition streams from hard-to-watch angles, as well as there being a lack of full-time journalists dedicated to covering women's hockey.

Media coverage of women's hockey has also been criticized for focusing too much on players' relatives and their personal lives and not enough on their playing performances. Coverage has also tended to comment disproportionately on players' physical appearances. A 2016 study on sports coverage from Cambridge University stated that "language around women in sport focuses disproportionately on the appearance, clothes and personal lives of women, highlighting a greater emphasis on aesthetics over athletics."

A doctoral thesis by Ryerson University professor Donna Gall found that most potential viewers of women's hockey did not know where to access coverage of games. Gall's conclusion was that this was caused by media coverage which tended to focus on the issues facing women's hockey rather than the actual ongoing competitions, making it hard for potential viewers to follow games. A study of NBC's play-by-play commentary during the women's tournament at the 2010 Winter Olympics found that the women's players were more often compared to men's players than to other women, and that the male commentators were far more likely to hold male players up as role models for women's players.

Attempts to promote the growth of women's hockey media coverage have often been met with resistance. One often-presented argument is that women's hockey does not deserve media coverage because nobody would watch it if it did get coverage. Canadian professor Courtney Szto has spoken out against that argument by noting that a number of sporting events only significantly after they received widespread coverage, including the IIHF World Juniors. She has also pointed out that the 2019 Clarkson Cup finals, one of three CWHL games broadcast on TSN in the 2019–20 season, received ratings comparable to other sports broadcasts on the network such as Premier League games. The NWHL became the first North American professional women's hockey league to sign a broadcasting deal with a rights fee when they signed a three-year deal with Twitch in 2019. In 2018, C More had signed a deal with the SDHL to broadcast 12 games during the 2018–19 season.

Women also face higher barriers to entering the sport as journalists, often facing discrimination. Andi Petrillo, who became the first female reporter to travel on the Toronto Maple Leafs' team charter in 2006, stated that: "Some people didn't care but some made my life hell because of my gender. If I was seen talking to a player, some reporters felt I was flirting."

=== Lack of record-keeping ===
Women's competitions also face barriers to accessing statistics, which can affect coverage of the game, access to information on the sport for fans, and efforts by players and coaches to improve performance. In 2015, online hockey statistics website Elite Prospects began adding female players to their database for the first time. Sports data analyst Meghan Chayka has stated that "unless you show up on a box score in women’s hockey, traditionally it’s lost. Even a lot of the game tape is hard to find."

After the Canadian Women's Hockey League (CWHL) put all its archived artifacts and its trophies up for auction as part of the liquidation process of its collapse, several members of the women's hockey community raised concerns about the possibility that it could lead to a significant erasure of the game's history. The CWHL put all nine of the league's trophies on the auction block, including the Angela James Bowl which was awarded to the leading point scorer each season, and the Jayna Hefford Trophy which was awarded to the league's Most Valuable Player (MVP). Trophies for the Coach of the Year, Goaltender of the Year, and Rookie of the Year were also auctioned off.

The gut wrenching part about seeing these trophies go up for sale as if they are regular commodities and not historical and cultural artifacts is because it's possible that a big part of women's hockey history could be erased... We cannot say that public memory exists for women's hockey. We are writing that history every day and we are fighting to have women included on selection committees and induction lists; therefore, those trophies need to end up in a public archive.

— Dr. Courtney Szto, "Trophies Matter: Women’s hockey and the politics of memory", Hockey in Society (April 26, 2019)

The Clarkson Cup, named after former Canadian Governor General, Adrienne Clarkson, was designed by Inuit artists and depicted the sea goddess, Sedna.

== See also ==
- Misogyny in sports
- Code of Misconduct
- Hockey Canada sexual assault scandal
- 2019 Sweden women's national ice hockey team strike
- U.S. women's national soccer team pay discrimination claim
- Gender pay gap in sports
- Race and ethnicity in the NHL
- Transgender people in ice hockey
- Violence in ice hockey

== Works cited ==
- Robinson, Laura (1998). Crossing the Line: Violence and Sexual Assault in Canada's National Sport. McClelland & Stewart. ISBN 0-7710-7560-X.
