= Frontrunner =

Front-runner is a term to describe the leader in a race, whether in politics, sports or a beauty pageant.

It may also refer to:

== Arts and media ==
- The Front Runner (film), a 2018 political drama directed by Jason Reitman
- The Front Runner (novel), a 1974 gay novel by Patricia Nell Warren from which LGBT running and walking clubs derived their name
- Frontrunner (album), 2018, by Frontperson
- "Front Runner", a Stan Rogers song from the 1978 album Turnaround
- "Front Runners", a 2012 episode of Star Wars: The Clone Wars
- Frontrunner, a 2008 documentary about Massouda Jalal's campaign for the presidency of Afghanistan

== Vehicles ==
- Front Runner, a sailboat
- FrontRunner, a commuter rail train in Utah
- Front Runner UGV, an unmanned ground vehicle, made in Israel
- FrontRunner, a railroad boxcar model built by TTX Company

== Other uses ==
- FrontRunners, a group of Indigenous Canadian athletes
- Frontrunners, a collective name for the worldwide network of LGBT running and walking clubs
