= Crossing the Line =

Crossing the Line may refer to:

== Film and television ==
- Crossing the line (filmmaking), breaking the 180-degree rule
- Crossing the Line (2002 film), a film by Graeme Clifford
- Crossing the Line (2006 film), a documentary by Daniel Gordon
- Crossing the Line (2008 film), a 2008 short by Peter Jackson and the first film made with the Red One camera
- "Crossing the Line" (Friday Night Lights), a 2006 television episode
- "Crossing the Line" (Pole to Pole with Michael Palin), a 1992 television episode
- Crossing the Line, an alternate US title for the film The Big Man, by David Leland
- Crossing the Line, an alternate UK title for the film Little Woods, by Nia DaCosta
- Crossing the Line, a 2007 documentary by Pietro Marcello

== Books ==
- Crossing the Line (novel), a 2004 novel by Karen Traviss
- Crossing the Line: Violence and Sexual Assault in Canada's National Sport, a 1998 book by Laura Robinson
- Crossing the Line (McKenzie book), a 2023 non-fiction book by Nick McKenzie

== Events ==
- Crossing the Line Festival, an annual fall arts festival held by French Institute Alliance Française in New York City
- Crossing the Line '99, a 1999 professional wrestling event
- "Crossing the Line", a song from season 3 of Rapunzel's Tangled Adventure
- "Crossing the Line", a song by Trust Company from True Parallels

== See also ==
- Cross the Line (disambiguation)
- Crossing Lines, a crime drama television series
- Crossing a Line, 2022 book by Amahl Bishara
- "Crossing a Line", 2018 song by Linkin Park off the album Post Traumatic
- Line-crossing ceremony in a ship voyage
