= Juron =

Juron can be a masculine given name or a surname. Notable people with the name include:

- Juron Criner (born 1989), American football wide receiver
- Jordan Juron (born 1994), American ice hockey forward
