= Crossing the Lines =

Crossing the Lines may refer to:

- Crossing the Lines (project), a flood control project
- Crossing the Lines (Bragg novel), a 2003 novel by Melvyn Bragg
- Crossing the Lines (Gentill novel), a 2017 novel by Sulari Gentill

== See also ==
- Crossing the Line (disambiguation)
