= NHL cheerleading =

Cheerleading in American professional hockey

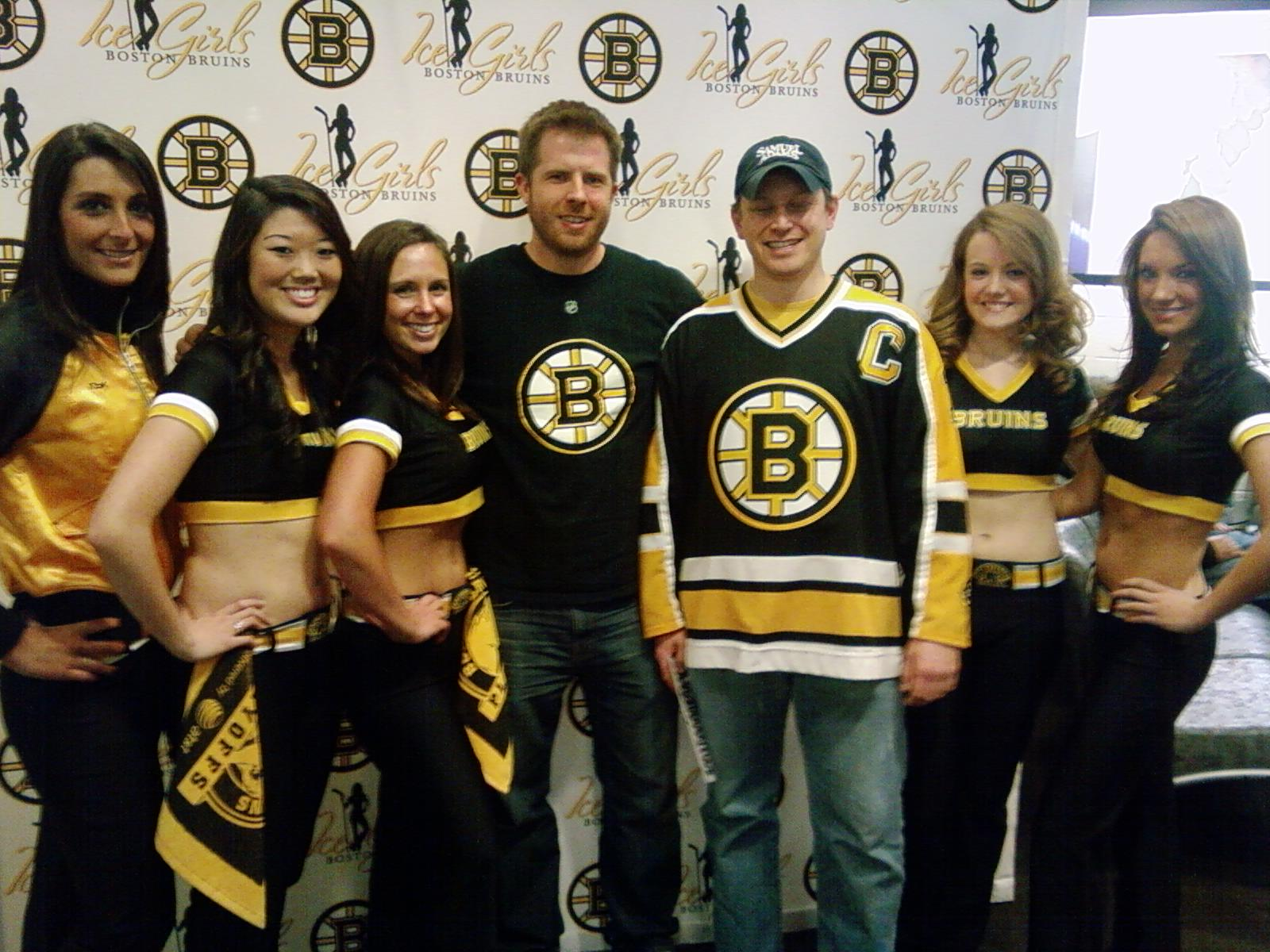
Boston Bruins Ice Girls with fans in 2010

The National Hockey League (NHL) is a professional hockey league with teams in the United States and Canada. Some of the teams have a squad of dancers, ice skaters, or promotional representatives called NHL Cheerleaders or NHL Ice Girls. These teams were historically all-female but some have become co-ed in the 21st century. NHL Cheerleaders are involved in dancing and performances, charity work, modeling, and public relations for the league's hockey teams.

The NHL's first Ice Girls team, affiliated with the New York Islanders, made its debut during the 2000–01 NHL season. Traditionally, NHL teams had all-male ice teams to clean the ice during the games, and the Islanders rebranded the concept to incorporate dancers and models. The Dallas Stars followed suit, launching their inaugural Dallas Stars Ice Girls in the 2001–02 NHL season. Their first team consisted of ten women ice skaters to clear away accumulation of snow around the goals and boards during period time outs. By the 2006–07 NHL season, the Ice Girls performed choreographed dances and engaged in promotional activities and community events. The first Canadian team in the NHL to introduce an Ice Girls group was the Edmonton Oilers in 2010. The Oilers disbanded the cheer team in 2016.

In the 2010s and 2020s, some NHL teams did away with the traditional Ice Girls and opted for co-ed "promo teams", including the Boston Bruins and the Carolina Hurricanes, with more emphasis on fan relations and less on performances. This was due to several NHL teams facing criticism for sexual exploitation and objectification of the women dancers and arguments about poor working conditions and low pay.

== Teams ==
A list of some of the NHL Ice Girls and Cheerleaders includes:

NHL Team	Cheerleading Team Names
Anaheim Ducks	Power Players
Boston Bruins	Boston Bruins Promo Team
Carolina Hurricanes	Canes Crew
Chicago Blackhawks	Chicago Blackhawks Ice Crew
Dallas Stars	Dallas Stars Ice Girls
Florida Panthers	Florida Panthers Dance Team
Los Angeles Kings	LA Kings Ice Crew

== Notable cheerleaders ==
- Kate Steinberg, internet and television personality, former cheerleader for the Chicago Blackhawks

== See also ==
- List of NHL mascots
- NBA cheerleading
- NFL cheerleading
