= Cross the Line =

Cross the Line may refer to:

- Cross the Line (novel), a 2016 novel in the Alex Cross series by James Patterson
- Cross the Line (film) (Spanish: No matarás), a 2020 Spanish thriller film directed by David Victori
- "Cross the Line", a 1986 song by Spandau Ballet from the album Through the Barricades
- "Cross the Line", a 2003 song by Kabir Suman from the album Reaching Out
- "Cross the Line", a 2019 song by James Morrison from the album You're Stronger Than You Know

== See also ==
- Crossing the Line (disambiguation)
