= Kate Steinberg =

American social media personality

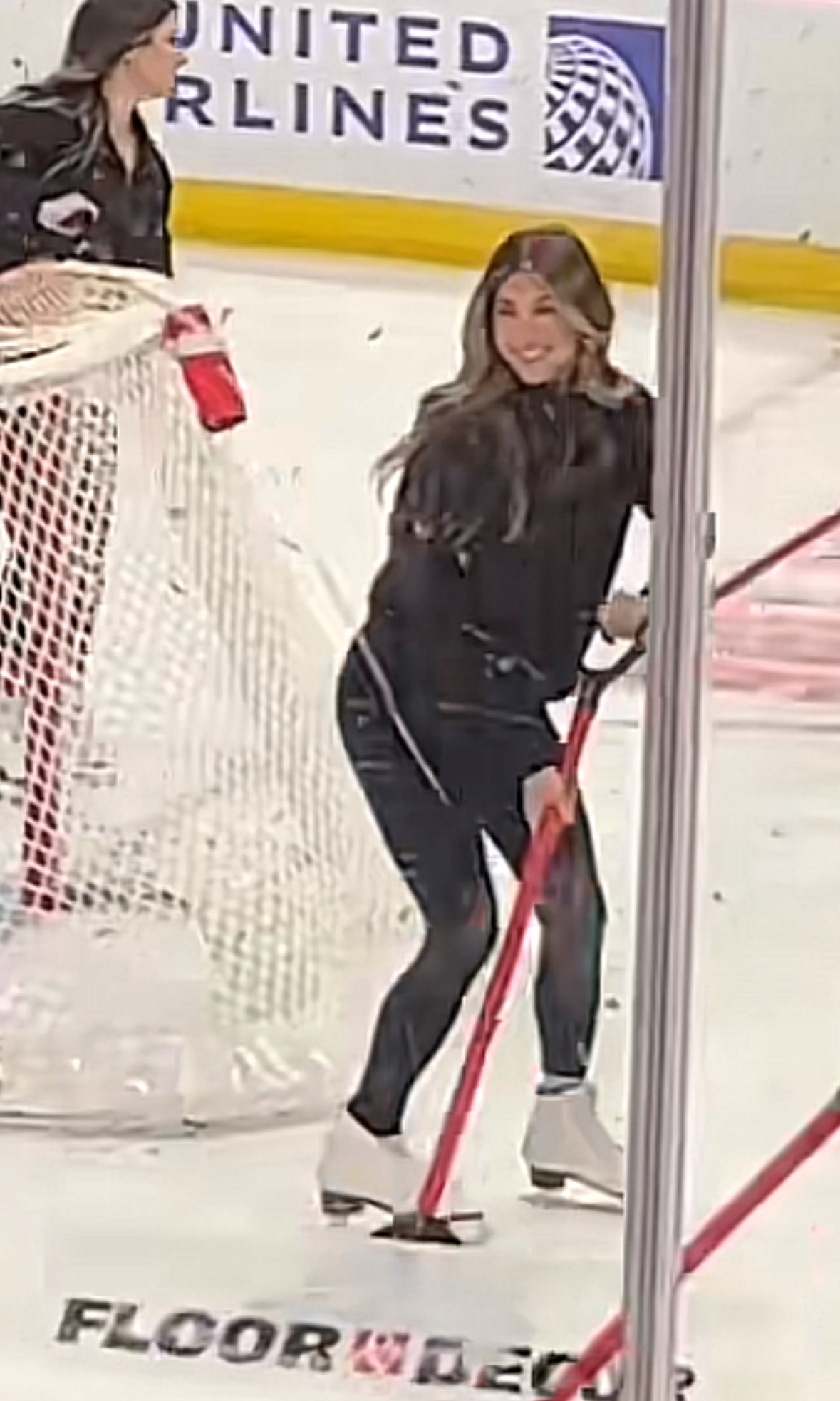
- Steinberg as a Chicago Blackhawks Cheerleader in 2022
- Born: July 19, 1991 (age 35); Chicago, Illinois, U.S.
- Education: DePaul University (BA)
- Occupations: Social media influencer television personality cheerleader
- Partner(s): Chad Savage (2020–present; engaged)

TikTok information
- Page: itskatesteinberg
- Followers: 2.9M
- Last updated: June 5, 2026

Kate Steinberg (born July 19, 1991) is an American social media personality, television personality, and former professional cheerleader. She competed on the HBO Max's 2020 reality television dating series 12 Dates of Christmas in 2020 and was an NHL cheerleader for the Chicago Blackhawks.

== Early life and education ==
Steinberg grew up in the Chicago area. She trained in pom dance and joined Wheeling High School's cheerleading squad during her junior year of high school. She studied advertising and public relations at DePaul University, where she was a member of the DePaul Blue Demons cheerleading squad and a member of Alpha Gamma Delta, the Golden Key International Honour Society, and the Public Relations Student Society of America.

== Career ==
Steinberg continued to cheer professionally, participating in a cheerleading program with the Chicago White Sox and later becoming an NHL cheerleader for the Chicago Blackhawks.

She began creating content on TikTok in 2019, focusing on lived experiences of millennials and nostalgia for youth culture of the 1990s and 2000s. By 2025, she amassed 2.6 million followers on TikTok and over 847,000 followers on Instagram. Steinberg left her job in advertising to pursue a full-time social media career.

Steinberg was a participant on HBO Max's 2020 dating game show reality television series 12 Dates of Christmas.

In 2024, she competed on the American gameshow The Price is Right and won a Nissan Versa. Per the show's terms and conditions, she was able to claim a credit for the value of the car and used that to get a Toyota RAV4.

== Personal life ==
Steinberg became engaged to Chad Savage, a cast member on 12 Dates of Christmas, during the show's finale in 2020. On September 23, 2025, Savage re-proposed to Steinberg. They live in West Hollywood.
