= Laura Robinson (journalist) =

Canadian sports journalist (born 1957/58)

Laura Jane Robinson
- Born: 1957/1958
- Education: University of Western Ontario
- Occupations: Journalist, author
- Known for: sports discrimination & abuse reports
- Notable work: Crossing the Line: Sexual Assault in Canada's National Sport (1998 book)

Laura Robinson (born 1957 or 1958) is a Canadian sports journalist and author who has reported on sexual abuse as well as racial and sexual discrimination in Canadian sports. She is the author of the 1998 book Crossing the Line: Sexual Assault in Canada's National Sport.

== Early life, education, and sports ==
Robinson grew up in Mississauga, Ontario in the 1970s. She studied social sciences at the University of Western Ontario.

Robinson was a Nordic skier, runner, and three-time Ontario cycling champion, and a rowing champion for Ontario and Canada in 1979. When she began competitive cycling, she experienced gender discrimination. Prizes then for men's races were cash or new bikes while female riders earned bubble bath or chocolates.

At the age of 16 years old, Robinson had to leap out of a car to avoid the advances from a 30-year-old coach. In 1987, a serious bicycle accident in Vancouver were a motivational and financial factors motivating Robinson towards a career in journalism.

== Career ==
In 1990, Robinson's first paid article was a The Globe and Mail op-ed on the need for women athletes to overcome 'pink-ribbon syndrome.' She was a sports columnist for a couple of years for Toronto's Now Magazine and produced a Fifth Estate 1996 documentary Thin Ice that investigated hazing and sexual abuse in junior ice hockey. Her 1992 article, Sexual Abuse: Sport's Dirty Little Secret was published by the Toronto Star. In July 1992, a senior editor of the Toronto Star messaged Robinson (a freelance reporter at the time) stating that obsessiveness in her conversation with him could be admirable, but also possibly irritable. The message was later discussed by Robinson in the 2015 Furlong defamation court case.

In 1994, Robinson twice interviewed Ken Shields, the Order of Canada recipient and former head coach of Canada's national basketball team. The Globe and Mail published her report about possible racial discrimination against Black people due to their lack of participation as players on the national team. Shields later cited the interview when testifying in court in 2015 during her lawsuit versus John Furlong.

In 2011, Robinson won silver medal Book of the Year Award from the American Library Association for her children's book Cyclist BikeList: The Book For Every Rider. Also in 2011, a newspaper serving Ontario First Nations asked Robinson to review the bestseller memoir published by John Furlong to investigate possible inaccuracies or omissions, such as his first arrival in Canada in 1969. Later in the year, she published a little-noticed story on the Danish website Play the Game about Furlong's first time in Canada which included comments by former students that were positive and very opposite from the accusations published in 2012. In July 2012, the Toronto Star reviewed and edited Robinson's first draft of her article about abuse allegations against Furlong from 1969–70 and withdrew from publishing it; Vancouver newspaper The Georgia Straight, published it two months later. The article received national attention for accusing Furlong of physically abusing students when he was an instructor at Immaculata Roman Catholic Elementary School in Burns Lake, British Columbia. Robinson published a second article that same day in the Ontario-based Indigenous newspaper Anishinabek News, in which she wrote that one student had reported a sexual assault to the Royal Canadian Mounted Police (RCMP). Furlong launched legal processings against The Georgia Straight, but dropped them a year later. Robinson attempted litigation against Furlong, but lost the case.

In 2014, Robinson was consulted by a University of Ottawa task force addressing the one-year suspension of its men's varsity hockey team for two players charged with sexual abuse.

In May 2023, Robinson was to speak at a Human Rights Tribunal for abuse victims in Burns Lake and systemic racism of the RCMP in mishandling the case. In 2026, the tribunal ruled in favour of the victims and ordered the RCMP to pay compensation and review its policies.

== Books ==
- She Shoots, She Scores: Canadian Perspectives on Women and Sport (Thompson Educational Publishing, 1997)
- Crossing the Line: Sexual Assault in Canada's National Sport (Toronto: McClelland & Stewart, 1998) about hazing and sexual assault in junior hockey
- Black Tights: Women, Sport, and Sexuality (HarperCollins, 2002)
- Great Girls: Profiles of Awesome Canadian Athletes (Harper Trophy Canada, 2004) children's book about female athletes with disabilities.
- The Frontrunners: Niigaanibatowaad (Brucedale Press, 2008) FrontRunners at the 1967 Pan Am Games, Winnipeg
- Cyclist BikeList: The Book For Every Rider (Toronto: Tundra Books, 2010) (juvenile)

== Personal life ==
Robinson is married. In 2013, she lived near Owen Sound, Ontario.
