= Elite Prospects =

Ice hockey database

- Website type: Ice hockey statistics database
- Available in: English
- Headquarters: Stockholm, Sweden
- Founder: Johan Nilsson
- Website: www.eliteprospects.com
- Launched: 2 December 1999; 26 years ago
- Current status: Active

Elite Prospects (stylised as EliteProspects and abbreviated to EP) is a Swedish ice hockey statistics website and database. The site indexes players, coaches, teams and leagues across professional, junior and college hockey worldwide. With more than 1.27 million player profiles, it has been described as ice hockey's equivalent to Wikipedia.

The site was founded in 1999 by Johan Nilsson, then a high school student in Kalmar, Sweden.

== History ==
Elite Prospects was started on 2 December 1999 by Johan Nilsson, a student in Kalmar. Early content consisted of weekly scouting reports and simple HTML player pages aimed at a North American audience.

The site migrated from static HTML to a MySQL database in 2004. In summer 2005, Nilsson began systematically tracking player transfers, a feature he has cited as the main driver of the site's early growth. In 2007, the site was acquired by the Swedish sports-media company Everysport, with Nilsson continuing to lead it; he transitioned to working on Elite Prospects full-time in 2012.

Live coverage of the NHL Entry Draft was launched in 2010. The database surpassed one million registered players in February 2023. For the 2024 World Junior Championship, held in Gothenburg, Elite Prospects was the "official career partner".

The company has offices in Stockholm, Växjö, and Tampa, Florida.

== Content and features ==
Volunteer fact-checkers update information, and statistical corrections are reviewed by a support team that requires confirmation from leagues or clubs before changes are applied. While players can request updates to their height, weight, and points, Elite Prospects requests an official source to verify updates.

EP Premium is the site's subscription tier introduced in 2018. As of 2024, Elite Prospects has 20,000 active subscriptions, more than half of which are players.

== "EP-scouting" ==
The term EP-scouting describes sports directors perceived to rely on Elite Prospects rather than in-person scouting when evaluating signings. In an interview with the Swedish Hockey League, Nilsson noted that "EP-scouting" was likely uncommon at the SHL level but more frequent at lower divisions.
