= Crossing the Line: Violence and Sexual Assault in Canada's National Sport =

1998 non-fiction book by Laura Robinson

- Author: Laura Robinson
- Language: English
- Subject: Sexual abuse in junior ice hockey in Canada
- Genre: Non-fiction
- Publisher: McClelland & Stewart
- Publication date: 1998
- Publication place: Canada
- Pages: 256
- ISBN: 0-7710-7560-X

Crossing the Line is a 1998 non-fiction book by Canadian journalist Laura Robinson about sexual abuse in junior ice hockey.

The book documents examples of abuse, and critiques the roles of the Canadian media and of the owners of ice hockey teams.

== Publication and background ==
Crossing the Line: Violence and Sexual Assault in Canada's National Sport was published by McClelland & Stewart in 1998. It was written by Canadian Toronto Star and Globe and Mail sports journalist Laura Robinson. Robinson was also the producer of The Fifth Estate's 1996 documentary Thin Ice that investigated hazing and sexual abuse in junior ice hockey.

The junior ice hockey league is the feeder league for the National Hockey League.

== Synopsis ==
The book documents hazing, abuse, and rituals in Canadian junior ice hockey, and is informed by interviews with players, coaches, and both female and male victims of abuse. Stories include that of Graham James, Sheldon Kennedy, Gordon Stuckless, and Martin Kruze. The book documents cycles of abuse where victims become abusers, and where sexual abuse is combined with substance abuse.

The book documents how Canadian society idolizes ice hockey players from a young age and draws parallels between public enthusiasm for ice hockey and organized religion. It notes how Canadian media presents ice hockey through a sexualised lens: equating sporting success with virility and losing a game with impotence. The book portrays ice hockey teams as dysfunctional families where violence is engrained. It graphically documents anal sex between men, gang rape, and abuse that includes tying string around the penises of rookie players. The book alleges that the problem of sexual abuse in junior ice hockey is widespread and underreported.

The book calls for an end to the separation of boys and girls in junior ice hockey, and the return to community ownership of ice hockey training facilities. The book identifies the root cause of the problem as the corporations that own the ice hockey teams and their prioritization of profit over the wellbeing of hockey players and the community.

== Critical reception ==
Martin D. Schwartz of Ohio University compared the book to writing by American sociologists Gary Alan Fine, Michael Messner, and author Mariah Burton Nelson that dealt with the degrading sexualization of women. Schwartz described the proposed solution in the book as "correct", but "a bit on the utopian side". The review by Sandra Kirby, from the University of Winnipeg, praised the authors' level of research and stated that it was "hard to disagree with her conclusions".

== See also ==
- Hockey Canada sexual assault scandal
- Misogyny in ice hockey
