= Crossing a Line =

2022 book by Amahl Bishara

Crossing a Line: Laws, Violence, and Roadblocks to Palestinian Political Expression
- Author: Amahl Bishara
- Publisher: Stanford University Press
- ISBN: 978-1-5036-3137-3

Crossing a Line: Laws, Violence, and Roadblocks to Palestinian Political Expression is a nonfiction book by Amahl Bishara. The book is an ethnography of political expression for Palestinian citizens of Israel and Palestinians in the occupied West Bank, based on Bishara's field research in the region.

Crossing a Line was published by Stanford University Press in 2022. It received positive reviews.

== Background ==
Amahl Bishara is an associate professor of anthropology at Tufts University and a Palestinian American. Her father's side of the family are Palestinian citizens of Israel, and she also has an Israeli passport; her partner has familial ties to Aida Refugee Camp in the West Bank. Bishara conducted previous field research into journalism in the West Bank during the Second Intifada, while traveling to Galilee to visit her family. This research culminated in her first book, Back Stories: U.S. News Production and Palestinian Politics. Overall, she has spent more than 20 years conducting fieldwork in the occupied Palestinian territories and Israel, leading her to see the ways Palestinians experience political expression and action in different ways depending on their location and background.

I was inspired to write this book both by my life experiences and through a sense of intellectual and political urgency.

— Amahl Bishara

Crossing a Line was published by Stanford University Press in 2022. It is 350 pages long.

== Synopsis ==
Crossing a Line is an ethnography of the political aspects of expression for Palestinian citizens of Israel as well as Palestinians in the occupied West Bank, specifically exploring the fragmentation and connection of Palestinians between and beyond these two regions. Rather than comparing the regions, Bishara states that "distinct threats to expression in different parts of Palestine compound limits on expression for all Palestinians".

The first chapter discusses the name Palestine and its shifting connotations over time. Each subsequent chapter explores a different method of expression and how it is utilized on either side of the Green Line. These include protests in Lod and Bethlehem against the 2014 Gaza War, commemorations of Nakba Day in various locations, mourning on Facebook of Palestinians killed by Israeli forces, a photography exchange arranged by Bishara between Jaffa and Aida Refugee Camp, and kinship and care work during incarceration. Chapters are separated by narrative interludes in which Bishara recounts her experiences crossing the Green Line. She refers to these interludes as "Passages".

== Reception ==
Choice recommended Crossing a Line in 2023, describing it as a critical and revealing work of research, and praising its accessibility to general readers as well as academics. PoLAR: Political and Legal Anthropology Review praised the "vivid detail" of Bishara's writing.

A 2023 review in Race & Class discussed Crossing a Line alongside Palestine Hijacked by Thòmas Suárez, praising both as "works that combine intellectual rigour with a commitment to justice for the dispossessed". The review described the book as "a meticulous study of Israel's continuing domination and steady appropriation through multiple forms of fragmentation, immobilisation, ghettoisation and violence". Also in 2023, a review in Against the Current praised the book's focus on "ordinary Palestinians" and described it as a "refreshing" text.
