= Premier Hockey Federation Players' Association =

PHFPA
- Premier Hockey Federation Players' Association
- Founded: 2015
- Dissolved: 2023
- Location(s): United States; Canada
- Executive Director: Nicole Corriero

The Premier Hockey Federation Players' Association (PHFPA), formerly known as the National Women's Hockey League Players' Association (NWHLPA), was a representative body for professional ice hockey players in the Premier Hockey Federation (PHF). The association was founded in 2015, the year of the league's founding, and disbanded in 2023 after the league was purchased and dissolved as part of the establishment of the Professional Women's Hockey League (PWHL). Former PHF players now playing in the PWHL are members of the PWHL Players Association.

== History ==
In 2015, the NWHL announced that its players' association would consist of two elected players from each team. Erika Lawler served as the director of the players' association in its inaugural season. The elected player representatives during the NWHL's inaugural season were Emily Pfalzer and Meghan Duggan from Buffalo Beauts, Celeste Brown and Taylor Holze from the New York Riveters, Kelli Stack and Kaleigh Fratkin from the Connecticut Whale, and Hilary Knight and Brianna Decker from the Boston Pride.

In the midst of the league's second season in 2016–17, the league announced that it would be immediately cutting player salaries by up to 50% to address financial sustainability. To that point, the league had committed to a salary range between $10,000 and $26,000 per player. In response to the cuts, players made calls for greater transparency from the league. By 2019, players reported being paid as little as $2,000 per season.

In 2019, the NWHLPA negotiated what it called a "breakthrough" agreement with the NWHL, resulting in an undisclosed increase to salaries and a 50-50 split of sponsor-related revenues after NWHL operating costs were met. According to the PA, these were the first "substantial gains" players had made since the league was founded.

In 2023, as it became clear that the Professional Women's Hockey Players Association (PHWPA), which had been organizing a boycott of the NWHL since 2019, was preparing to launch a new professional women's league, the PHFPA held discussions about formally unionizing. Ultimately, the PHF was acquired by PWHPA business partner Mark Walter in June, and the league was wound down as part of the launch of the new Professional Women's Hockey League (PWHL). The PWHLPA negotiated a landmark eight-year collective bargaining agreement (CBA) with the new league, which was ratified in July 2023. PHF players were not party to negotiations, nor did they have a chance to review or vote on the agreement.

In July 2023, the outgoing PHF Board of Governors appointed a PHF Player Leadership Committee to work with the new league and help PHF players, who were provided severance packages, with the transition. The Committee included at least one representative from each former PHF team: Jillian Dempsey and Allie Thunstrom from Boston; Dominique Kremer from Buffalo; Kacey Bellamy and Kennedy Marchment from Connecticut; Fratkin, Madison Packer, and Katerina Mrázová from the Riveters; Sydney Brodt from the Minnesota Whitecaps; Ann-Sophie Bettez from the Montreal Force; and Shiann Darkangelo from the Toronto Six. On July 2, the players released a statement expressing their support for the new league and stating that "all women's hockey players are united stronger than ever".
