= Front Runner =

Sailboat

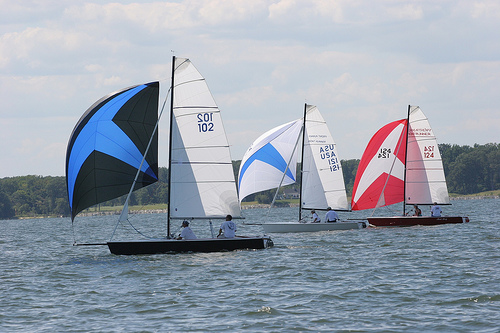

Boat
- Crew: 2
- Draft: 4 ft 6 in (1.37 m)

Hull
- Hull weight: 750 lb (340 kg)
- LOA: 19 ft (5.8 m)
- LWL: 18 ft 6 in (5.64 m)
- Beam: 7 ft (2.1 m)

Sails
- Jib/genoa area: 62 sq ft (5.8 m^{2})
- Spinnaker area: 325 sq ft (30.2 m^{2})
- Upwind sail area: 202 sq ft (18.8 m^{2})

The Front Runner is a small day sailing dinghy. It is a high-performance, responsive, and comfortable one-design class sailboat. It is stable and user-friendly, having an immense cockpit with all control lines leading aft (to the cockpit). While designed for racing, it also functions as a small cruising day sailer because of the storage space under the deck in the bow.

The Front Runner was developed by Bill Spencer in the early 1990s, culminating in its production starting in 1996. The sailboat was produced in three different places: Gloucester, Virginia, Irvington, Virginia, and Hollywood, Maryland. It has a total of 202 square feet (18.8 m^{2}) of sail area (including only the mainsail and jib; with the spinnaker it reaches 527 square feet (49.0 m^{2}) of sail area). For the spinnaker it has a retractable bowsprit. The main is loose-footed, and its jib is roller furling. It has no trapeze due to its exceptional balance and hull construction. Its rig, a low-profile, 3 point fractional Sloop rig, kick-up rudder, and swinging keel make the Front Runner a high-performance sailing craft.

To this date, between 25 and 30 Front Runners have been manufactured. These craft are sailed primarily in Deltaville, Virginia, but several reside in Florida, Delaware, Northern Virginia, and the Solomon Islands.

== Sources ==
http://www.fbyc.net/

http://video.google.com:80/videoplay?docid=-7131099101976149457&pr=goog-sl

http://www.iboats.com/Front_Runner_Sailboats__Front_Runner__2002/bp/64b165620r2

http://www.fbyc.net/Fleets/OneDesign
