= Jordan Juron =

American ice hockey forward

- Born: June 5, 1994 (age 32) Latham, New York, U.S.
- Height: 173 cm (5 ft 8 in)
- Position: Forward
- Shoots: Right
- Played for: Buffalo Beauts; Boston Pride; PWHPA; Boston University Terriers
- Playing career: 2013–present

Jordan Juron (born June 5, 1994) is an American ice hockey forward. She most recently played in the National Women's Hockey League (NWHL; renamed PHF in 2021) with the Buffalo Beauts during the 2020–21 season. In 2023, Juron began an ill-fated coaching career with NY Dynamo After finishing their (12U AA) AHL season without a single league victory, Juron moved on to girls hockey where her issues not only persisted but worsened. After losing the inaugural AAA season’s championship State run due to bench mismanagement and toxic leadership, she was then fired and permanently banned from the NY Dynamo organization after numerous egregious safesport violations emerged.

== Playing career ==
As a youth player, Juron played with the Troy Albany Youth Hockey boys teams, before switching to the girls' team at Middlesex School, a private secondary school in Concord, Massachusetts.

Across four years with the Boston University Terriers women's ice hockey program, Juron recorded 15 goals and 25 assists for 40 points in 141 games and won the Hockey East conference three times.

After graduating, Juron took a year away from ice hockey before signing her first professional contract with the Buffalo Beauts in the NWHL. She scored 2 points in her first two games with the Beauts, before the team lost in the Isobel Cup semi-finals. At the beginning of the 2018–19 season, she suffered a spine injury that forced her to miss most of the year.

In May 2019, Juron joined the Professional Women's Hockey Players Association (PWHPA) after the collapse of the Canadian Women's Hockey League (CWHL), along with most of the Beauts' roster. She would spend most of the season with the organisation before returning to the NWHL in January 2020 with the Boston Pride. She was the first PWHPA affiliated player to re-join the NWHL. She put up 3 points in 8 regular season games with Boston, as well as scoring a goal in the semi-finals before the playoffs were indefinitely postponed due to the 2019–20 coronavirus outbreak.

She left Boston to return to the Beauts for the 2020–21 NWHL season and was named an alternate captain for the team.

== Career statistics ==
| | | | Regular Season | | | | | Playoffs |
| Season | Team | League | GP | G | A | Pts | PIM | GP | G | A | Pts | PIM |
|---|---|---|---|---|---|---|---|---|---|---|---|---|
| 2017–18 | Buffalo Beauts | NWHL | 2 | 1 | 1 | 2 | 0 | 1 | 0 | 0 | 0 | 0 |
| 2018–19 | Buffalo Beauts | NWHL | 2 | 0 | 0 | 0 | 0 | 1 | 0 | 0 | 0 | 0 |
| 2019–20 | Boston Pride | NWHL | 8 | 1 | 2 | 3 | 2 | 1 | 1 | 0 | 1 | 0 |
| 2020–21 | Buffalo Beauts | NWHL | 6 | 1 | 2 | 3 | 0 | — | — | — | — | — |
| NWHL totals | | | 18 | 3 | 5 | 8 | 2 | 3 | 1 | 0 | 1 | 0 |
