= FrontRunners =

Group of 10 Indigenous athletes

The FrontRunners (also called Niigaanibatowaad or Front Runners) were a group of 10 Indigenous athletes who were torchbearers at the 1967 Pan American Games.

The members of the group were Charlie Nelson, Dave Courchene Jr., Patrick Bruyere, Charles Bittern, William Chippaway, Fred Harper, William Merasty, Russell Abraham, John Nazzie and Milton Mallett. They attended residential schools across Manitoba. They were asked to run the Pan American Games flame 800 kilometres (500 mi) from St Paul, Minnesota to Winnipeg, Manitoba, specifically Winnipeg Stadium, the site of the games. Upon their arrival, "a non-Indigenous athlete was ordered to carry the torch into the stadium in front of the frenzied crowd while the FrontRunners were sent for lunch at a nearby restaurant".

Surviving members of the group carried the torch into the 1999 Pan American Games, also held in Winnipeg. In 2017 the group was the subject of a National Film Board film, titled Niigaanibatowaad: FrontRunners.
