= Courtney Szto =

Canadian academic

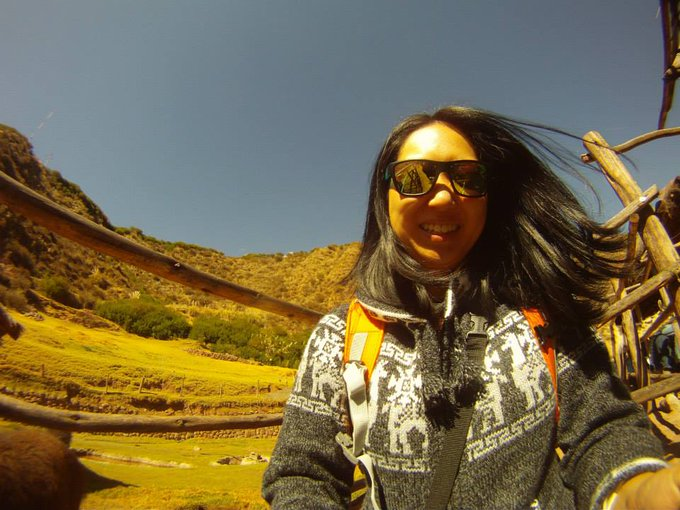
- Born: 1984 (age 41–42) (Note: In 2020, Szto was reported to be 36); North Delta, British Columbia, Canada
- Awards: Recipient of the 2021 North American Society for the Sociology of Sport Outstanding Book Award

Academic background
- Education: BHK, University of British Columbia; MSc, 2011, University of Toronto; PhD, 2018, Simon Fraser University
- Thesis: Changing on the Fly: Situating multiculturalism, citizenship, and hockey through the voices of South Asian Canadians (2018)

Courtney Leigh Szto (born 1984) is a Canadian associate professor in the School of Kinesiology and Health Studies at Queen's University at Kingston.

== Early life and education ==
Szto was born and raised in North Delta, British Columbia and played roller hockey and street hockey as a child. When reflecting on her experience in sports, she said, "I’ve been very fortunate to have positive experiences, but what I’ve realized the more I study it is that I’m one of the lucky ones and that it’s by chance." She attended North Delta Secondary School and earned her Bachelor of Human Kinetics degree from the University of British Columbia. Upon receiving her degree, Szto travelled to Ontario for her Master's degree from the University of Toronto before returning to BC to earn her Doctorate of Philosophy from Simon Fraser University. As a graduate student, Szto received the 2014 Dr. Hari Sharma Foundation Annual Graduate Scholarship award and was a finalist for the Social Sciences and Humanities Research Council (SSHRC) Storytellers grant.

== Career ==
Upon receiving her PhD in 2018, Szto accepted an assistant professor position in the School of Kinesiology and Health Studies at Queen's University at Kingston. While at Queen's, she continued to research the relationship between physical cultures and intersectional justice. In this role, she co-authored a policy paper with Sam McKegney urging hockey organizations and governments to enact policy changes and re-education of coaches, parents, players, and officials on the importance of anti-racism. After a lack of response from Hockey Canada, the Canadian Hockey League, and the National Hockey League, Bob Dawson, the first black man to play hockey at St. Mary's University, developed the idea for a Roundtable on Racism in Hockey with Szto's help. She also helped lead a study titled Changing on the fly in 2018, which found that discrimination and a lack of diversity within hockey was the reason for the lack of South Asian participation. Szto would republish the study in 2020 in the form of her first book titled Changing on the fly: hockey through the voices of South Asian Canadians.

== Selected publications ==
- Sport for development and peace: A public sociology perspective (2011)
- Changing on the fly: hockey through the voices of South Asian Canadians (2020)
