= Center for Mark Twain Studies =

Historical site associated with Elmira College

The Center For Mark Twain Studies is a cultural humanities site associated with Elmira College. The Center manages two historic sites, the Mark Twain Study and Quarry Farm, where the American author, Mark Twain, composed many of his works, including his 1884 novel Adventures of Huckleberry Finn. The center also includes exhibits and archives. It administers research fellowships and delivers extensive programming, including lectures series, symposia, teachers institutes, digital resources, podcasts, and the quadrennial International Conference on the State of Mark Twain Studies.

== History and founding ==
Samuel Clemens (Mark Twain) first visited Elmira in 1868 at the invitation of Charles Langdon, a young man he had befriended during the Holy Land Excursion of the Quaker City (formerly USS Quaker City), a pleasure cruise which Twain would soon turn into his first bestselling book, The Innocents Abroad (1869). During the trip, Langdon had shown Clemens as picture of his sister, Olivia Langdon. On New Year's Eve 1867, Sam Clemens and Livy Langdon were formally introduced, beginning a courtship which would result in marriage on February 2, 1870.

Shortly after their engagement, Langdon began worrying that her marriage to the itinerant Clemens would permanently sever her from her family, inspiring Clemens to make "an extraordinary promise." Starting the year after they were married, the Clemens family made an annual Summer pilgrimage to Quarry Farm, where they stayed, usually for 3–4 months, with Livy Clemens's older sister and her husband, Theodore and Susan Crane.

In addition to allowing his wife and daughters to maintain strong ties with their extended family and the Elmira community, Sam quickly found that it was an exceptional writing environment. "I can write ten chapters in Elmira where I can write one [in Hartford]," he told a friend in 1875. The previous year, the Cranes had built for him an Octagonal Study, designed to resemble the pilot house on a steamboat, at the peak of East Hill, overlooking the Chemung River Valley, about 100 yards from the main house at Quarry Farm. Here he would compose the majority of four novels, three memoirs, and hundreds of stories, essays, and speeches over the next two decades. In 1886, he told a visiting reporter, "This may be called the home of Huckleberry Finn and other books of mine, for they were written here."

Sam and Livy Clemens made their last extended residency at Quarry Farm in 1903, the year before her death. Both are buried nearby in the Langdon family plot at Elmira's Woodlawn Cemetery. But the property remained in the Langdon family for generations, until it was entrusted to Elmira College in 1982, the official founding of the Center For Mark Twain Studies, by Jervis Langdon Jr. Livy Clemens had been a student at Elmira Female College and her father, Jervis Langdon, was among the college's founders. The family ties to the college were deepened when the Clemens's niece, Ida Langdon, became a professor there. She arranged for the Octagonal Study to be relocated from Quarry Farm to the Elmira College campus in 1952. Her nephew, Langdon Jr., was the final member of the family to reside at Quarry Farm. He set the terms of the agreement with Elmira College that Quarry Farm would never be open to the general public, but would be reserved for promoting scholarship about Mark Twain and his circle.

== Quarry Farm Fellows ==
In observance of Langdon Jr.'s mandate, CMTS sponsors an annual fellowship competition for scholarly "scholarship and creative works related to Mark Twain, including, but not limited to, his literature, life, family, associations, influences, reception, and significance." In 2022, they made awards to 11 Fellows, each of whom was granted a 1-4 week residency at Quarry Farm, as well as an honorarium and access to archival collections. One fellowship was reserved for a creative writer, one for a visual artist, and three for early career researchers.

== Programming ==
=== The Trouble Begins lectures ===
In 1985, the sesquicentennial of Sam Clemens's birth and the centennial of Adventures of Huckleberry Finn, CMTS launched its first lecture series, The Trouble Begins at 8, the title draw from the advertising for Twain's first lecture. The initial program features five lecturers, including Leo Marx and Henry Nash Smith. The series was expanded in 1988 and several times since. Since 2017, it has consisted of 10-12 lectures each year, split between "The Barn," an auditorium retrofitted for the purpose on the Quarry Farm grounds, and the Elmira College campus, as well as additional Summer lectures at the Park Church. Many lectures, going back to the initial program in 1985, are recorded and archived on the CMTS website.

=== The International Conference on The State of Mark Twain Studies ===
Every four years, CMTS hosts a conference for hundreds of Twain researchers. The first gathering took place in 1989. The 2021 conference was postponed until 2022.

==== Conferences ====
- 1989 "Mark Twain & A Connecticut Yankee in King Arthur's Court," Keynote Address by Justin Kaplan
- 1993 "Lifetime Achievements of Louis J. Budd," Keynote by Budd
- 1997 "Celebrating the Centennial of Following The Equator," Keynote by Hamlin Hill
- 2001 [No Theme], Keynote by Ken Burns
- 2004 [No Theme], Keynote by Ron Powers
- 2009 "The Report of My Death Was An Exaggeration: Observing the Centennial of the Death of Samuel Langhorne Clemens," Keynote by Russell Banks
- 2013 "One Man, Many Legacies: 'Yours Dreamily, Mark Twain'," Keynote by Hal Holbrook
- 2017 "The Assault of Laughter," Keynote by Ben Tarnoff
- 2022 "Growth: The Most Rigorous Law of Our Being," Keynote by Jimmy Santiago Baca

=== The Quarry Farm Weekend Symposium ===
CMTS also hosts a much smaller annual symposium each Fall on specialized topics.

==== Symposia Themes ====
- 2008 "A Centennial Symposium on Mark Twain's The Mysterious Stranger," Keynote Address by Alan Gribben
- 2010 "en route: Mark Twain's Travel Books A Tramp Abroad and Following The Equator," Keynote by Louis J. Budd
- 2012 "Complicating Twain: Biography, Autobiography, & the Personal Scholar," Keynote by Laura Skandera Trombley
- 2016 "Mark Twain & Youth," Keynote by Jon Clinch
- 2018 "American Literary History & Economics in the New Gilded Age," Keynote by David Sloan Wilson
- 2019 "Mark Twain & Nature," Keynote by Michael P. Branch
- 2020 "American Humor & Matters of Empire," Keynote by John Wharton Lowe
- 2021 "Mark Twain & The West: Celebrating the 150th Anniversary of Roughing It," Keynote by Bruce Michelson
- 2022 "Abolition Studies," Keynote by Sarah Haley
- 2023 "Mark Twain & Science Fiction," Keynote by Sheila Williams
- 2024 "Gilded Ages," Keynote by Nathan Woolf

=== The Summer Teachers Institute ===
Each July, CMTS hosts primary and secondary teachers for a two-day workshop. Since 2019, the STI has been coordinated by Jocelyn Chadwick and CMTS's resident scholar, Matt Seybold.

=== The American Vandal Podcast ===
Seybold is also the producer and host of the CMTS podcast, The American Vandal Podcast:

- Season 1, [No Theme], 12 Episodes, Fall 2020
- Season 2, [No Theme], 13 Episodes, 2021
- Season 3, "Vandalizing The Chair," 4 Episodes, Fall 2021
- Season 4, "The World's Work," 7 Episodes, Winter 2022
- Season 5, "Mark Twain Among The Indians," 3 Episodes, Summer 2022 (Guest-hosted by Mika Turim-Nygren)
- Season 6, "HBO: From Pulp To Prestige," 6 Episodes, Fall 2022
- Season 7, "Social Problems," 4 Episodes, Fall/Winter 2022
- Season 8, "Criticism LTD," 16 Episodes, Fall 2023
- Season 9, "The Corporate Allegory Binge," 4 Episodes, Winter 2023-2024

== Staff ==
Full-time staff at CMTS include a director, a resident scholar, an archivist, and a caretaker, who lives in a guest house constructed on the Quarry Farm property. Since 2016, the director has been Joseph Lemak.

== See also ==
- Mark Twain
