= Old Campus (disambiguation) =

Old Campus most often refers to the oldest area of the Yale University campus in New Haven, Connecticut.

Old Campus or Old Campus Historic District may also refer to:

- Georgia Institute of Technology Historic District, in Atlanta, Georgia
- University of Minnesota Old Campus Historic District, in Minneapolis, Minnesota
- Old Campus Historic District (St. Lawrence University), in Canton, New York
- Elmira College Old Campus, a historic area of Elmira College in Elmira, New York
- Old Campus District, University of South Carolina, in Columbia, South Carolina
