= Jervis Langdon Jr. =

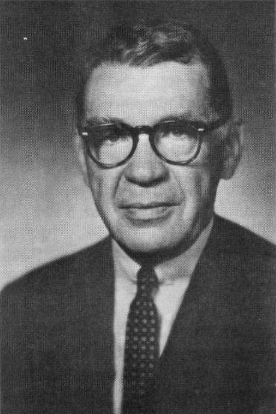
- Langdon in 1974

Jervis Langdon Jr. (January 28, 1905 – February 16, 2004) was an American railroad executive noted as president of B&O, the Rock Island, and Penn Central.

Langdon was a member of The Hill School class of 1923, but was expelled due to participating in a party where alcohol was involved (although he did not consume it). He then matriculated at Cornell University, and graduated with the class of 1927. He was nominated for the Rhodes Scholarship, but was ultimately not selected.

He served as a colonel in the Army Air Force during World War II.

He was a grand-nephew of Mark Twain, and in 1982, he donated his family house Quarry Farm to Elmira College for the use of studies of the author.
