= Mark Twain Study =

Mark Twain's personal study in Elmira, New York

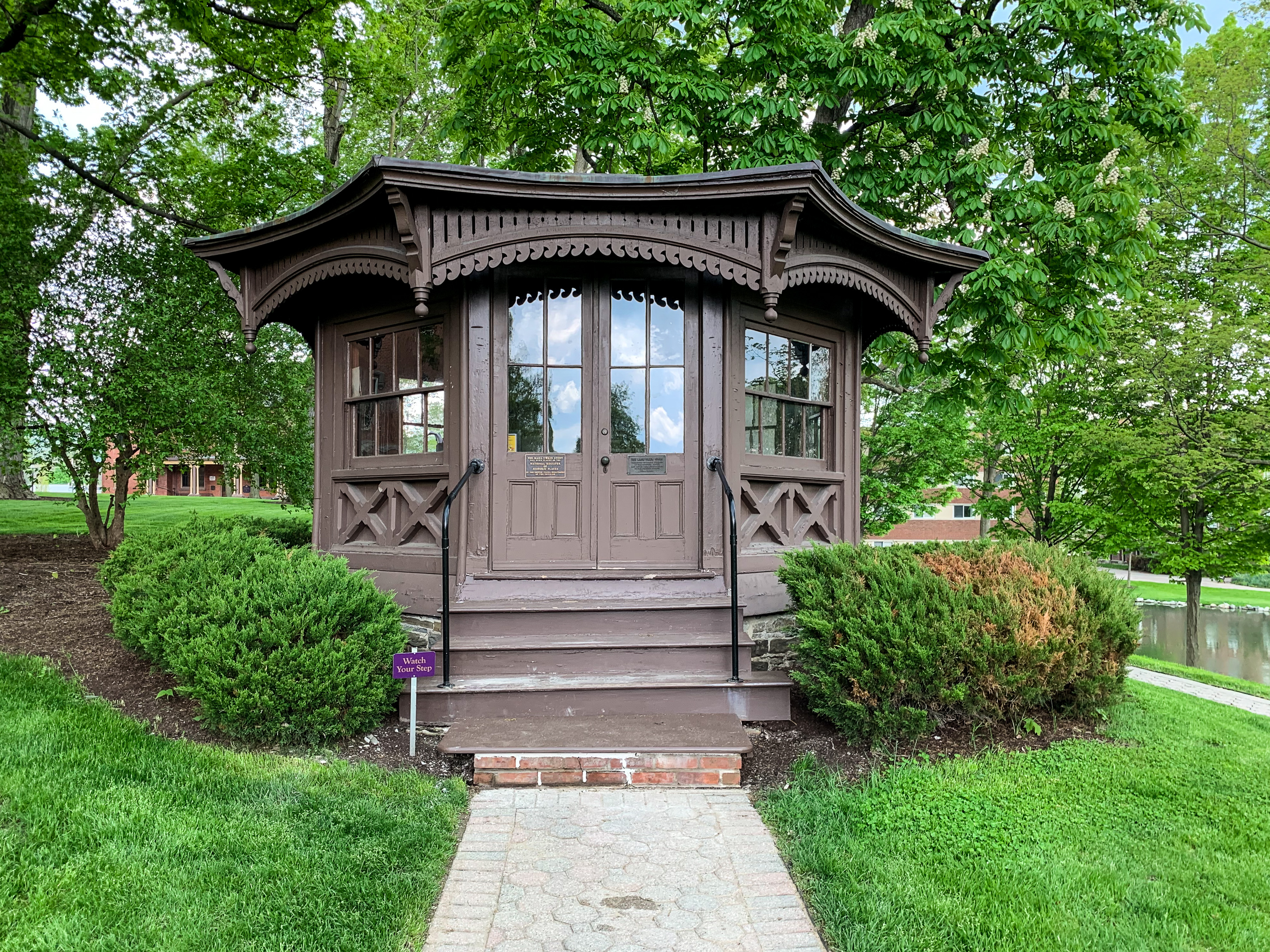
- The Mark Twain Study on the campus of Elmira College
- Interactive map of the Mark Twain Study area
- Alternative names: The Octagonal Study

General information
- Status: Museum
- Type: Writer's study
- Architectural style: American Vernacular
- Location: Elmira, New York
- Coordinates: 42°5′52.57″N 76°48′50.52″W
- Year built: 1874
- Opened: 1952 (at current location)
- Owner: Elmira College
- Operator: Center for Mark Twain Studies

Technical details
- Material: Wood

Other information
- Number of rooms: 1

Website
- www.elmira.edu/welcome-to-elmira/center-for-mark-twain-studies

The Mark Twain Study is a one-room, octagonal wooden building located on the campus of Elmira College in Elmira, New York. Constructed in 1874 at the nearby Quarry Farm, the summer home of Twain's sister-in-law, Susan Crane, it was where author Mark Twain (Samuel L. Clemens) wrote a number of his works, including The Adventures of Tom Sawyer (1876), Adventures of Huckleberry Finn (1884), Life on the Mississippi (1883), and A Connecticut Yankee in King Arthur's Court (1889).

The study was moved from its original location to the Elmira College campus in 1952. The relocation was intended to ensure its preservation and accessibility. It is now part of the college's Center for Mark Twain Studies.

== History ==
Mark Twain's connection to Elmira began with his marriage to Olivia Langdon Clemens in 1870. The family spent their summers at Quarry Farm, owned by Olivia's sister, Susan Crane, and her husband, Theodore Crane. In 1874, Susan Crane had a private study built for Twain on a knoll near the main house.

The building was designed as an octagon with a large window. Twain referred to it as his "little nest on the hill." During his summers at Quarry Farm from 1874 to 1890, he completed sections of novels and travel narratives. The study's secluded location provided an environment for his work.

In 1930, Quarry Farm was bequeathed to Elmira College. In 1952, the study was moved to the college campus. It was reconstructed near the main library and dedicated on June 9, 1952, by Twain's niece, Ida Langdon.

== Architecture and Description ==
The Mark Twain Study is an example of American vernacular architecture from the late 19th century. It is a one-room, wood-frame structure with an octagonal shape and a conical, shingled roof. The exterior is painted a light cream color with dark trim. A large window originally faced southeast, providing a view of the surrounding countryside.

The interior contains a desk, a chair, and a pot-bellied stove. These items are consistent with its use as a writer's workspace.

The study is one of four sites associated with Mark Twain in the United States.

== Current use ==
The Mark Twain Study is part of the Center for Mark Twain Studies at Elmira College. It is open to the public for tours. The study is a setting for the annual "Trouble Begins at 8" lecture series, which features scholarly presentations on Twain's work.

In 2017, the study underwent a restoration to address structural issues, including the windows and original finishes.

== See also ==
National Register of Historic Places listings in Chemung County, New York
