= Anna Pratt =

Anna Pratt may refer to:

- Anna Alcott Pratt (1831–1893), sister of American novelist Louisa May Alcott
- Anna Beach Pratt (1867–1932), American educator and social services organizer
