= Patty Abramson =

American venture capitalist

Patricia "Patty" Abramson
- Born: September 7, 1944; Pittsburgh, Pennsylvania
- Died: August 26, 2019 (aged 74)
- Education: Elmira College, American University
- Occupations: Business executive, Venture capitalist
- Known for: Co-founding the Women's Growth Capital Fund

Patricia "Patty" Abramson (September 7, 1944 – August 26, 2019) was an American venture capitalist and business executive who co-founded the Women's Growth Capital Fund, a venture capital fund focused on investing in women-owned businesses. Abramson previously worked in marketing and communications, including as a partner at Hager, Sharp & Abramson, before founding her own firm, Abramson Communications.

== Early life and education ==
Abramson was born on September 7, 1944, in Pittsburgh but was raised in Philadelphia. She completed her bachelor's degree at Elmira College in 1966 and acquired a master's degree in journalism from American University in 1975.

== Career ==
Abramson began her career as an account executive at Abramson Himelfarb. She later transitioned to the role of promotion director for the Sentinel Newspapers. In 1979, she joined Hager, Sharp & Abramson, a firm in Washington, D.C., eventually leading to the foundation of Abramson Communications in 1989.

In 1997, Abramson established the Women's Growth Capital Fund, a venture capital fund dedicated to investing in women-owned businesses. This initiative was a response to challenges she faced in obtaining credit, even post the enactment of the 1974 Equal Credit Opportunity Act. The fund successfully attracted $8 million in venture capital in its inaugural year and achieved a designation from the U.S. Small Business Administration. Over the first five years of the fund, Abramson raised approximately $30 million and invested into a variety of companies.

== Personal life ==
Outside her business pursuits, Abramson was involved in various civic and professional organizations in Washington, including the Georgetown Day School and the Edlavitch Jewish Community Center.

She was first married to David B. Abramson, which ended in divorce. Later, she married Les Silverman, a senior partner emeritus at McKinsey & Co. Abramson is survived by two daughters from her first marriage, a stepdaughter, a sister, and five grandchildren.
