= Elmira College Old Campus =

Historic district in New York, United States

- U.S. National Register of Historic Places
- U.S. Historic district
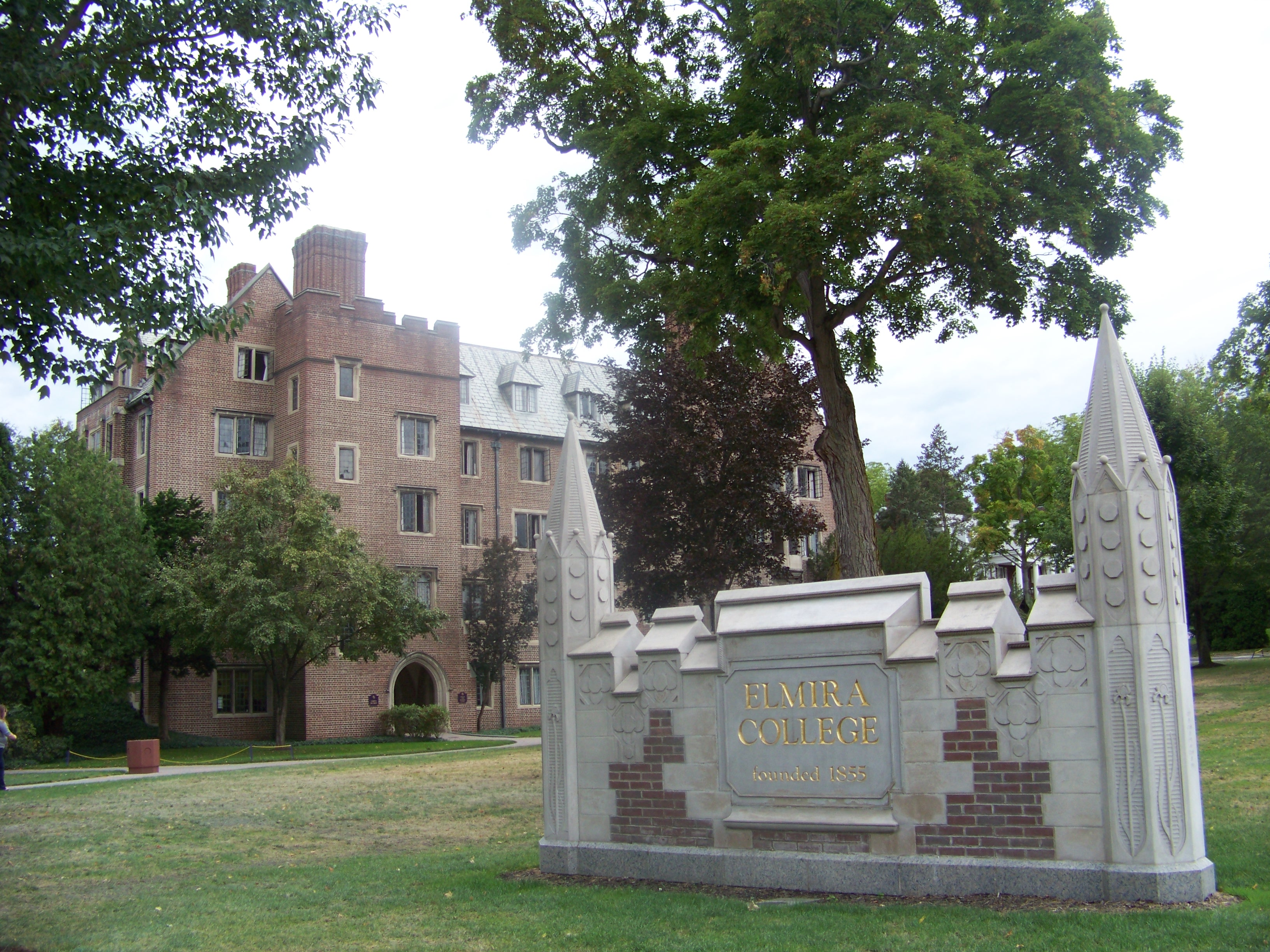

- Location within New York Location within the United States
- Location: Elmira, New York
- Coordinates: 42°5′52″N 76°48′53″W
- Built: 1855
- Architect: Multiple
- Architectural style: Classical Revival, Late Gothic Revival, Romanesque
- NRHP reference No.: 84002068
- Added to NRHP: August 23, 1984

The Elmira College Old Campus is the historic part of Elmira College in Elmira, New York. Historically known as The Elmira Collegiate Seminary or The Elmira Female College, the college was the first in the United States to offer to women a degree program on a par with programs offered to men. The contributing structures are significant examples of the architecture of the period. The contributing buildings are Cowles Hall, Hamilton House, Mark Twain Study, Gillett Hall, Carnegie Science Hall, Fassett Commons, Tompkins Hall, and Hamilton Hall.

== Gallery ==
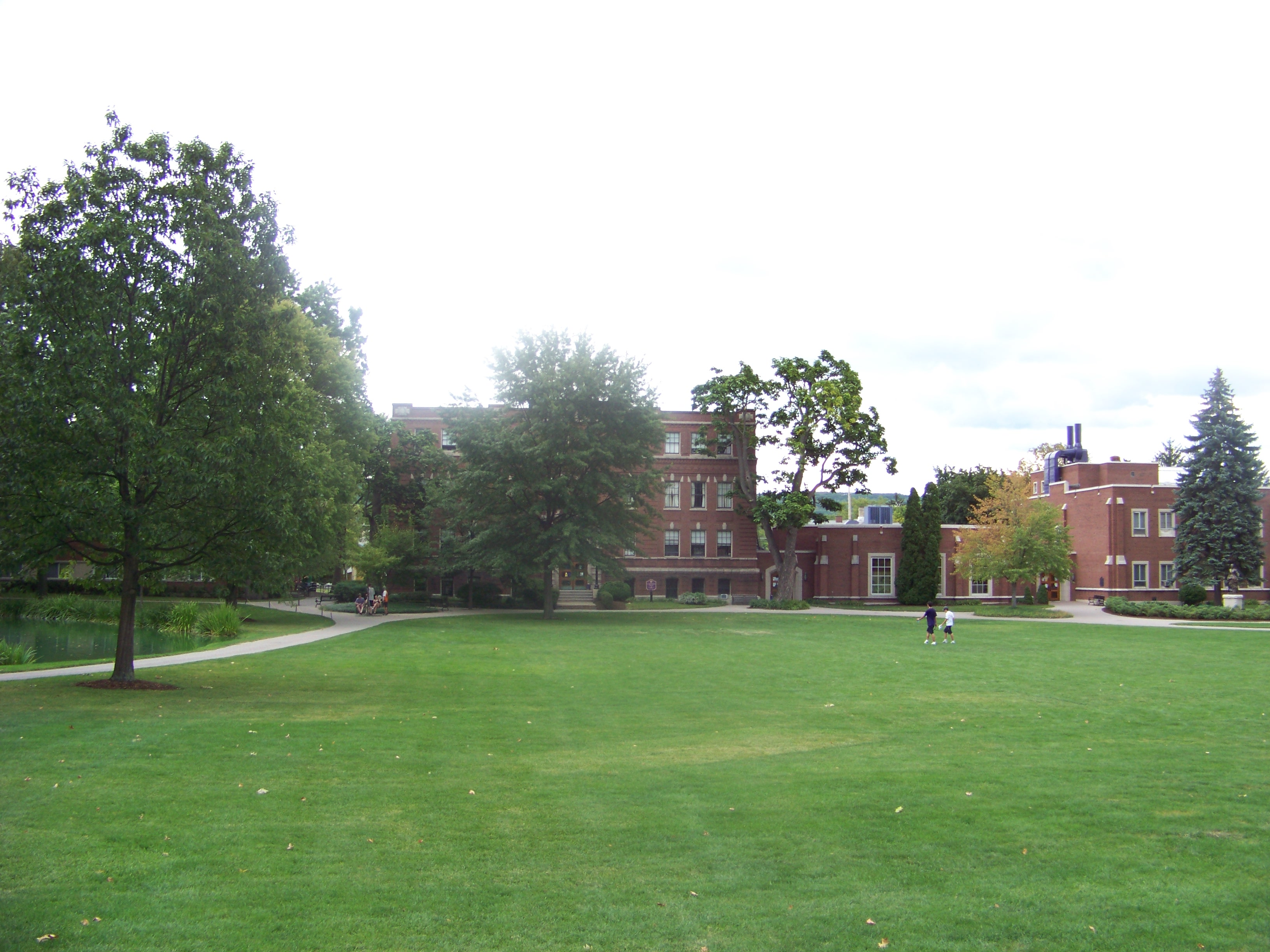
Carnegie Hall

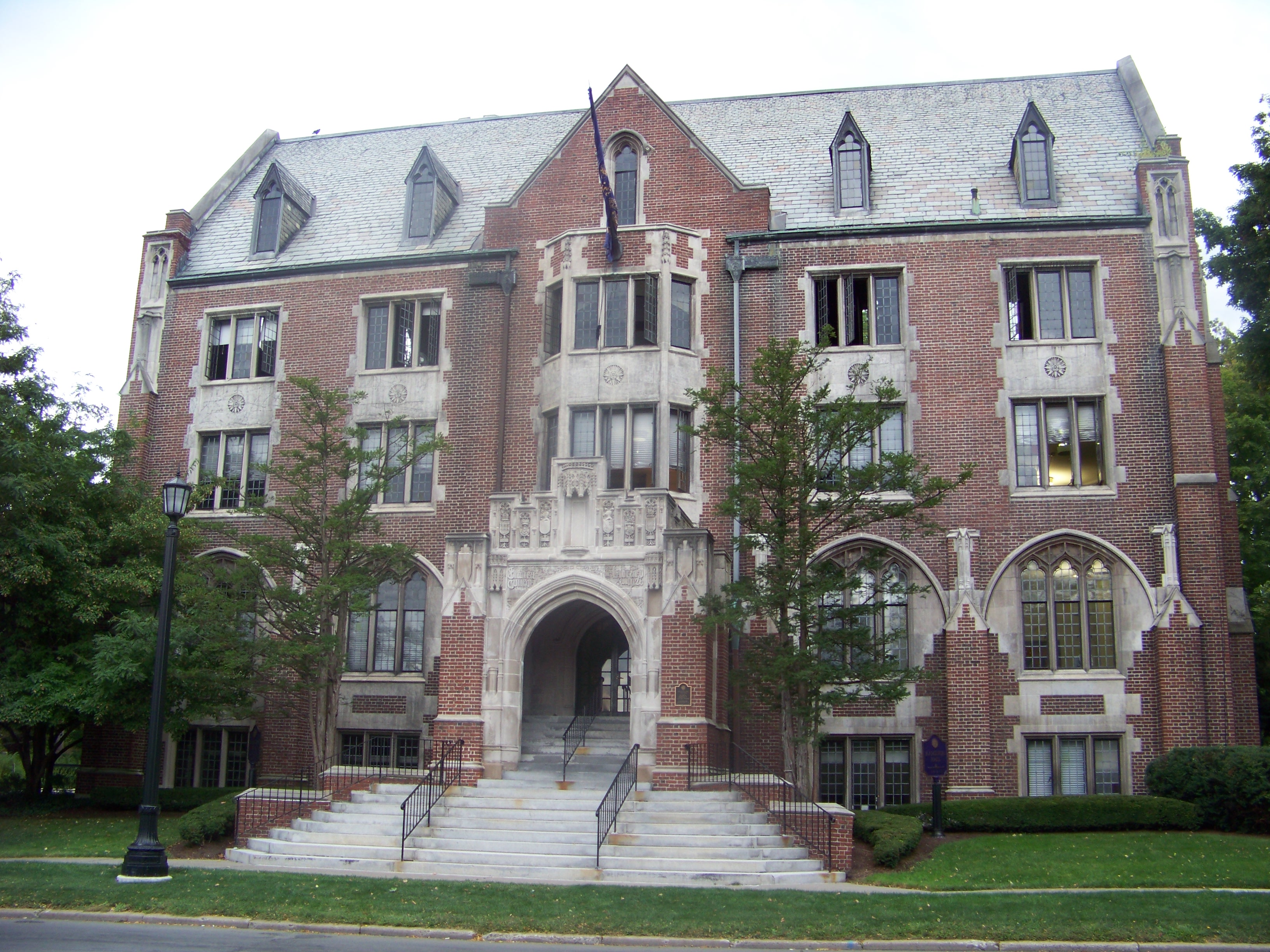
Hamilton Hall

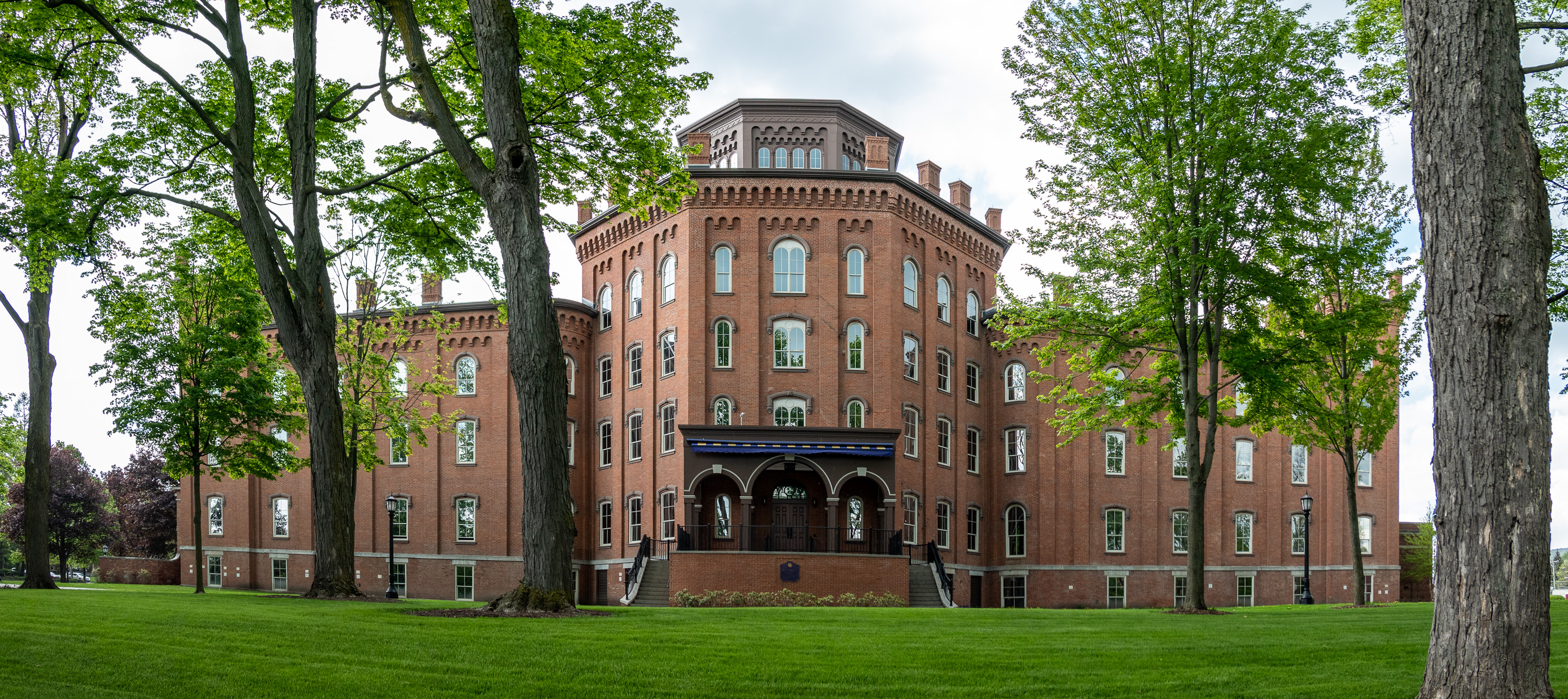
Cowles Hall

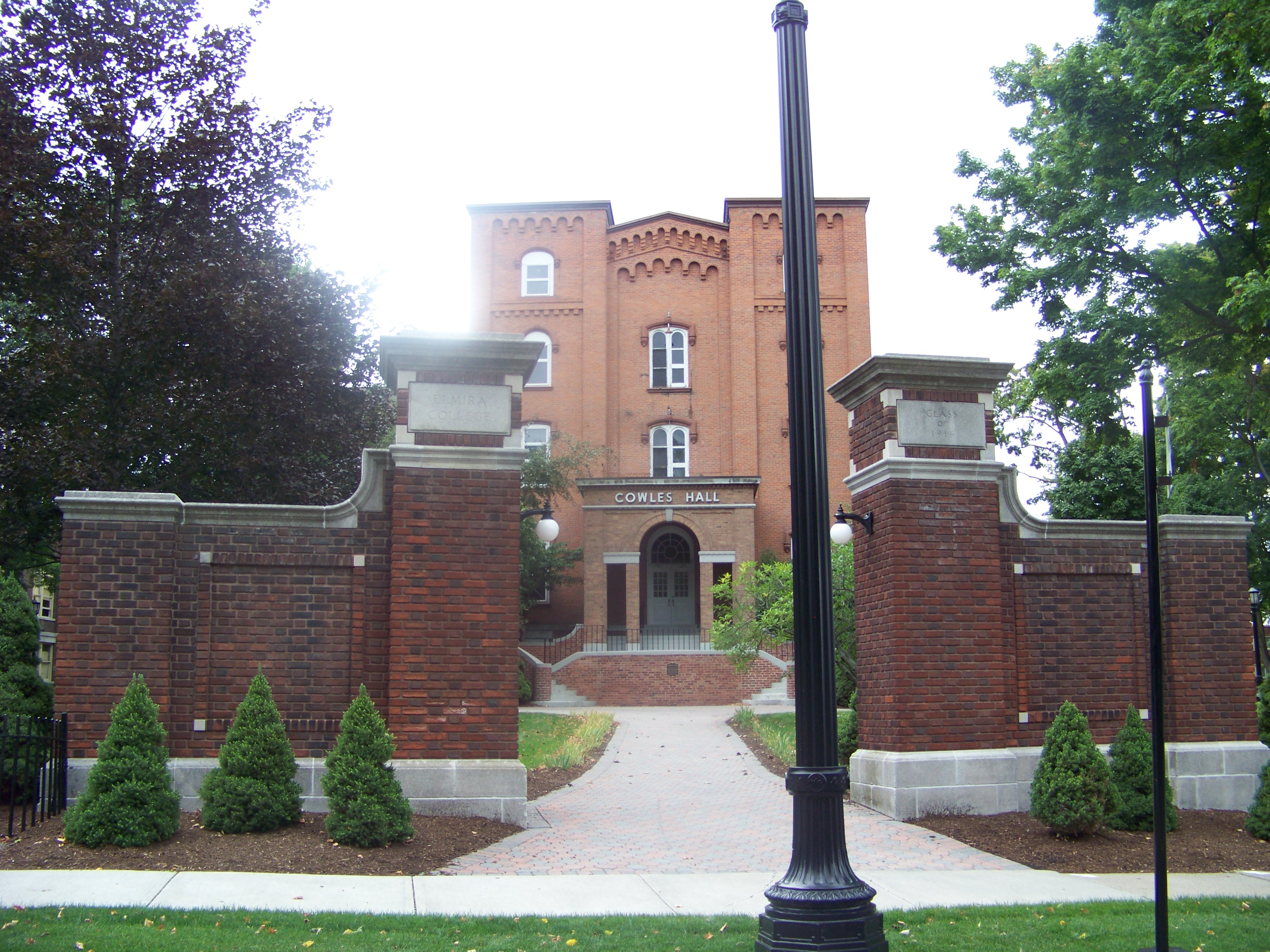
Cowles Hall entrance

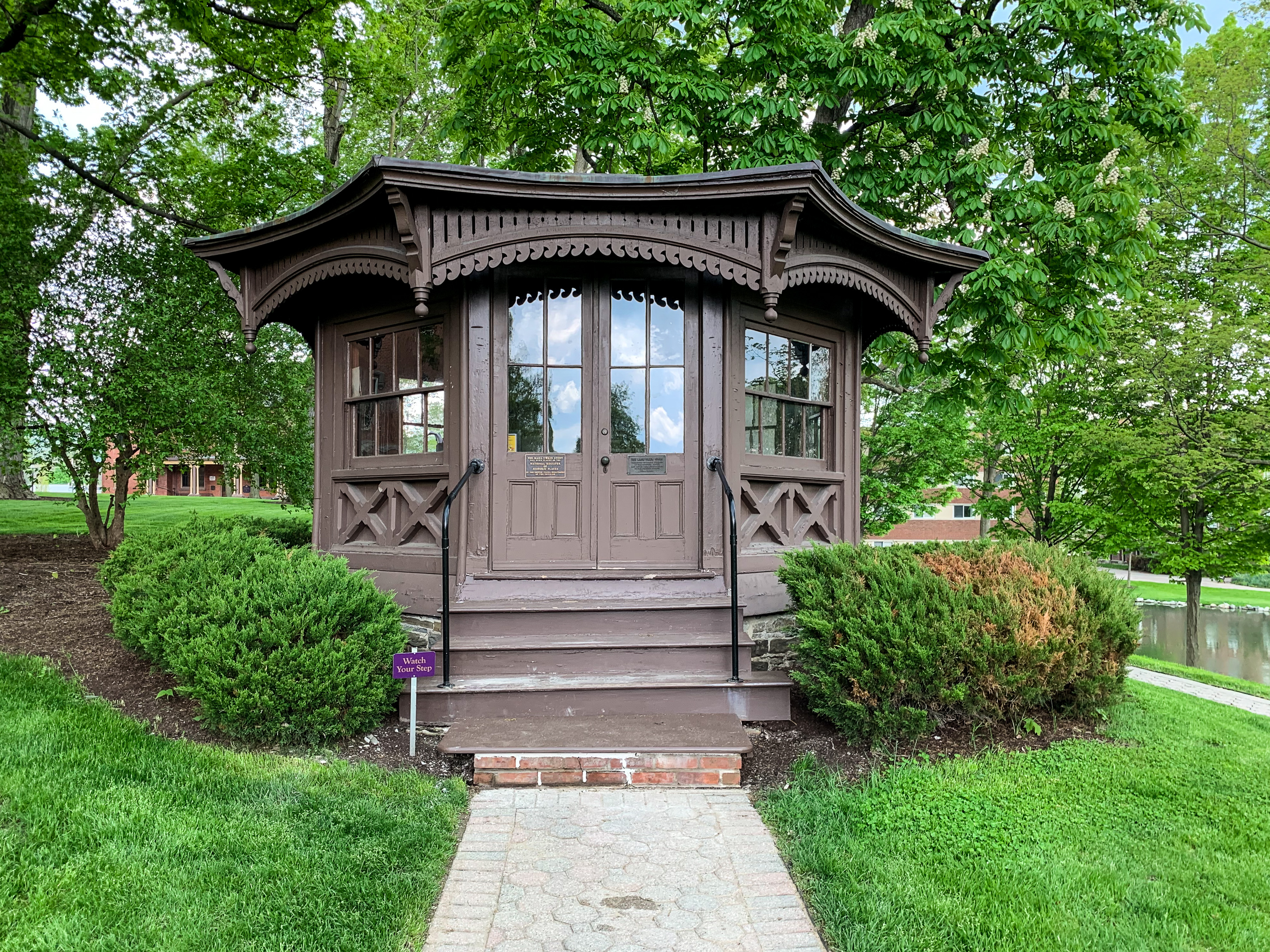
Mark Twain's study
