= Avatar Course =

Series of courses run by Star's Edge Inc.

The Avatar Course, often simply called Avatar, is a series of LGAT self-development courses founded in 1986 by Harry Palmer and run by his privately held company, Star's Edge, Inc., which trains and licenses Avatar Masters (teachers) to deliver the Avatar Course globally. The Avatar Course has been described by many as having cult-like qualities.

== Structure ==
The first version of The Avatar Course was released on 15 October 1986. As of 2008 the course had five sections: licensed Avatar "Masters" teach the first three; Star's Edge, Inc. teaches the two advanced sections.

The Avatar course in essence claims to identify and remove limiting beliefs ("belief management") so that students can become more effective in life.

== Scientology origins ==
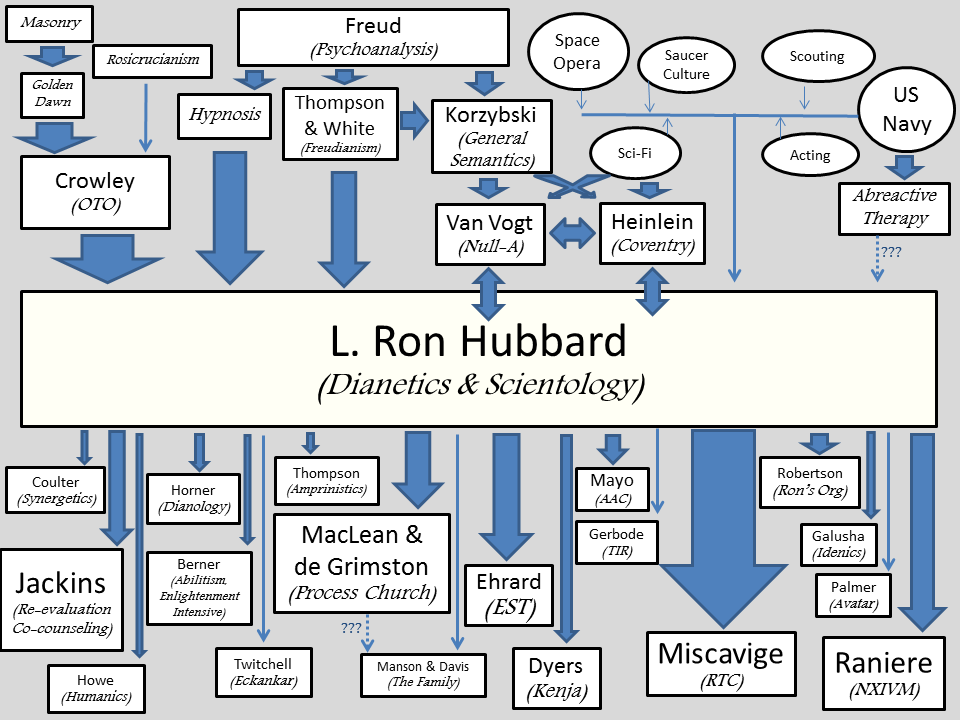

In 1975 the Elmira Mission incorporated under the name the Elmira Mission of the Church of Scientology and the following year it gained a license to use all Scientology trademarks and service marks held and controlled by L. Ron Hubbard. In exchange for that right, Palmer paid 10% of the Mission's income as a tithe to Scientology. Six years later Hubbard assigned his rights in all Scientology trademarks to Religious Technology Center (RTC), which the Church of Scientology had organized especially to own and protect all Scientology trademarks. RTC immediately increased the licensing fee. On September 9, 1982 Palmer signed a new License Agreement requiring the Elmira Mission to pay 15% of its income as well as additional fees to RTC in order to continue using the Scientology trademarks. When in November 1984 Palmer ceased making any payments to the Church of Scientology, the Church filed a lawsuit against Palmer and the Elmira Mission for trademark infringement.

The Church won on appeal and the court sealed details of the settlement.

About this time Palmer produced the first of the Avatar-related materials, including the Thoughtstorm Manual.

On 28 February 1998 (in a court case he lost against former employees before the State Labor Board) Palmer mentioned the renaming of "the Church of Scientology, Mission of Elmira, Inc. [...] on March 11, 1987, pursuant to Federal Court Order, [as] the Center for Creative Learning".

The original Avatar materials made extensive use of Scientology terminology. Harry Palmer sold them to other Scientologists, claiming that they achieved "end of case" and "cover[ed] the entire Scientology Bridge, the Buddhic path and beyond." Many of the terms continue in use in Avatar today, such as "Rundown", "Identities", and "handling"; and Avatar offers similar courses of the same names ("Integrity Course" and "Professional Course").

In addition to this history, similarities to Scientology in policies, structure, secrecy, and doctrine taught in higher levels have caused European news articles to refer to Palmer's Avatar Courses as "Scientology-Lite", picking up a term originally coined by Texas columnist Roahn Wynar.

== Galactic confederacy ==
At the first Wizards Course in 1991, Harry Palmer introduced the story about the history of consciousness in the Milky Way galaxy. The tale includes his version of Scientology's Galactic Confederacy: picturing Earth as one of the planets seeded with life, and suggesting that humanity risks destroying itself through a "blight bomb" that stops photosynthesis.

Other references to Palmer's claimed extraterrestrial knowledge and experience occur rarely, but exist in other speeches and texts, such as an excerpt from "The Translurian Record" and his claim to have read firsthand the equivalent of the "Prime Directive" of Star Trek.

== Controversy ==
=== Controversy over credentials ===
From a 1991 issue of the Avatar Journal, company literature and associated websites started portraying Harry Palmer (born April 3, 1944) as an Educational Psychologist, including claims that he received a master's in educational psychology from Elmira College (or alternatively that he majored in Educational Psychology). In his book Living Deliberately, Palmer claims to have majored in Educational Psychology as part of the Triplum Program at Ithaca College. In fact, he received a Bachelor of Arts in English from Ithaca College in 1969 and a master's in education from Elmira College in 1971, and gained certification to teach English in secondary schools. Neither Ithaca College nor Elmira College ever offered a major or minor course of study in Educational Psychology; and Educational Psychology never formed part of the Ithaca Plan (Triplum Program).

The Florida Department of Health investigated the academic credentials of Harry Palmer in 2005/2006. The Department found that he used the term "psychologist" illegally and made him sign a cease-and-desist agreement.

The biography on Palmer's website at this time calls him a "lifelong educator" though he was only a teacher between 1969 and 1972, which is consistent with previous biographies published by his company.

=== Objection to prayer at New Zealand city council meeting ===
In 2022, a Wellington City Council member voiced concerns about an Avatar representative being allowed to provide an opening prayer for the meeting.

== Legal actions ==
In 2000, Harry Palmer sued Eldon Braun, a former Avatar licensee and Palmer critic, for copyright and trademark infringement, unfair competition, breach of contract, intentional interference with a business relationship, and libel. In 2005, the court awarded Palmer $36,000 in damages for copyright infringement, $20,000 for libel damages, and $364,527.68 in attorney’s fees, with all other claims dropped or dismissed.

The copyright claim related to a self-study course Braun developed called The Source Course, which Braun billed as "an analog of the Avatar Course", "a refresher" for the Avatar Course, "a take-home manual" for graduates of the Avatar Course, and the "equivalent" of the Avatar Course materials. A preliminary injunction against the work failed, but the appeal concluded against Braun.

== Published works ==
Star's Edge, Inc has published all the works attributed to Palmer to date:

- The Thoughtstorm Manual: An Evolution in Human Thinking (ISBN 1-891575-03-1) - a group exercise handbook originally published pre-Star's Edge in 1986
- Living Deliberately: The Discovery and Development of Avatar (ISBN 0-9626874-3-X) - the story of how Harry Palmer developed the Avatar materials, including an overview of the course exercises. The e-version includes a "Publisher’s Note and Disclaimer" which states: "...The characters and events described in the text of LIVING DELIBERATELY are intended to entertain and teach rather than present an exact factual history of real people or events."
- Resurfacing: Techniques for Exploring Consciousness (ISBN 0-9626874-9-9) - the workbook associated with Section I of the Avatar courses.
- The Avatar Master's Handbook (ISBN 0-9626874-8-0) - associated with Section IV of the Avatar courses
- Love Precious Humanity: The Collected Wisdom Of Harry Palmer (ISBN 1-891575-23-6) - a book of quotations from Palmer
- Inside Avatar The Book: Achieving Enlightenment (ISBN 1-891575-13-9) - a collection of previously published articles
