= Stanley Rossiter Benedict =

American chemist (1884–1936)

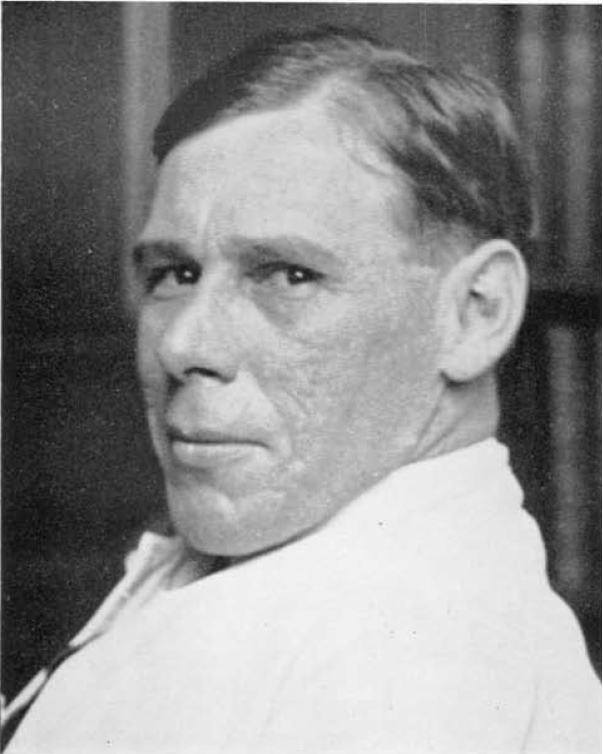
- Stanley Rossiter Benedict
- Born: March 17, 1884; Cincinnati, Ohio, U.S.
- Died: December 21, 1936 (aged 52); Elmsford, New York, U.S.
- Education: University of Cincinnati
- Spouse: Ruth Benedict
- Scientific career
- Fields: Chemistry, Biochemistry, Metabolism
- Workplaces: Cornell University

Stanley Rossiter Benedict (17 March 1884 – 21 December 1936) was an American chemist best known for discovering Benedict's reagent, a solution that detects certain sugars.

== Personal life ==
Stanley Rossiter Benedict was born on March 17, 1884, to a family of six children in Cincinnati. His father, Wayland Richardson Benedict was a professor of Philosophy and Psychology at the University of Cincinnati. His mother, Anne Kendrick Benedict, was a writer and a teacher and his maternal grandmother, a Professor of Greek, Latin and Sanskrit at the University of Rochester and was an editor of the King James Version of the Bible.

In 1914, Stanley R. Benedict married Ruth Fulton. However, their marriage was strained by their inability to have children, Ruth's writing career and her secret love affair with her female friend and colleague Margaret Mead which led to a separation in 1930. ''The Bo-Cu Plant,'' written by Ruth Benedict, is an illustration of her married life with Stanley.

During World War I (1914-1918), Stanley had an accident and was gassed while working on a government project concerning poisonous gas which had a negative impact on his health.

== Education and career ==
Benedict went to the Cincinnati public schools and University of Cincinnati. His plan was to enroll into medical school after his graduation. However, Stanley gave up the medical school for a career in Biochemistry and metabolism after working with Dr J.F. Snell, an expert in Biochemistry and Nutrition at the University of Cincinnati. He received his B.A. degree in Chemistry in 1906 at the University of Cincinnati and his PhD two years after (1908) in Physiological Chemistry at Yale University by working with Russel H. Chittenden and Lafayette Benedict Mendel.

Benedict became famous through Otto Folin's work after the latter published the volume 13 of American Journal of Physiology. Folin described in the Journal some methods on how to analyze qualitatively and quantitatively some elements in the urine such as urea, uric acid, ammonia, creatine, and creatinine. Benedict was also interested into how to quantify the rate of sugar in blood and urine, so he came up with a more efficient, simple methods which practically replace all of Folin's ones. After his doctorate, he taught Chemistry for one year at the University of Syracuse and Biological Chemistry the following year at Columbia University. From 1910 to 1936, Benedict taught Biochemistry at the medical school of Cornell University while at the same time running the Journal of Biological Chemistry as an editor in chief.

== Scientific Societies ==
Stanley Benedict was part of many Chemistry societies. He was a member of the National Academy of Sciences, American Association for the Advancement of Science, American Society of Biological Chemists (President 1919-1920), American Physiological Society, Phi Beta Kappa, Corresponding Member of the Societe Biologie de Paris, Sigma Xi, Alpha Omega Alpha, The Harvey Society, Associate Fellow of the New York Academy of Medicine.

== Death ==
Stanley Benedict died of heart attack at the age of 52
