= Anne Kendrick Benedict =

American author

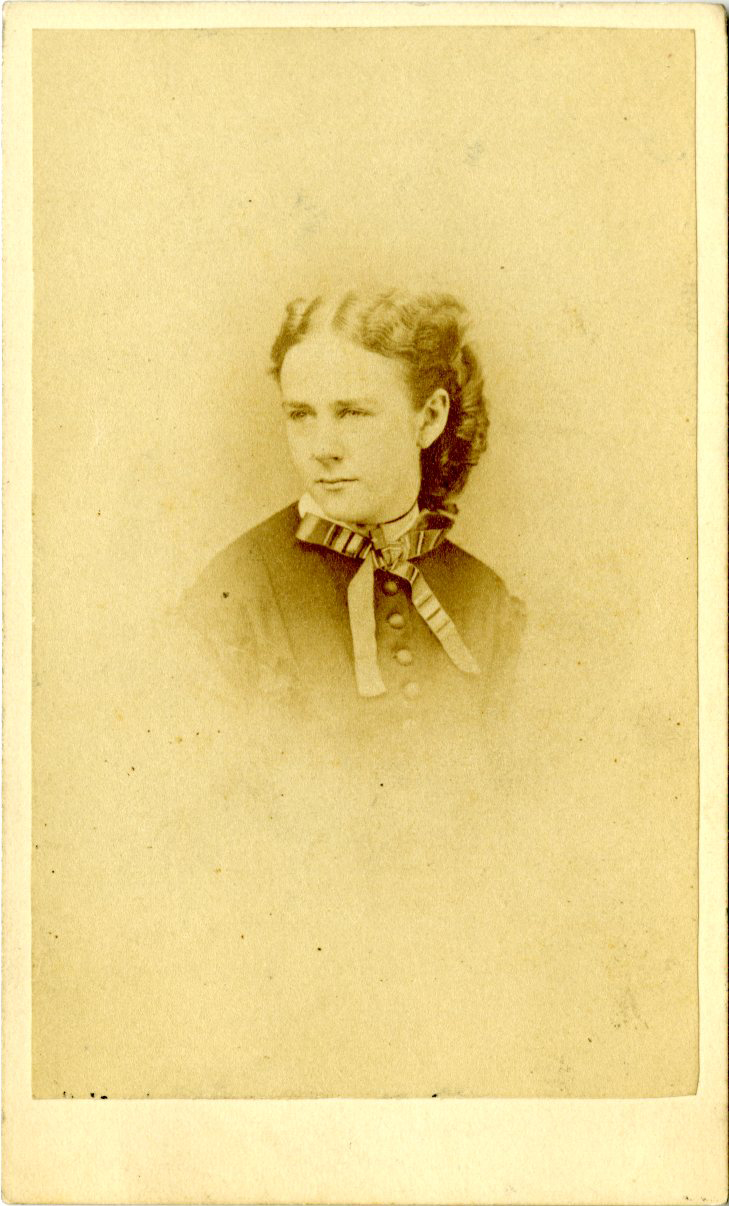
A portrait of Anne Kendrick Benedict from Elmira College in Elmira, New York.

Anne Elizabeth Kendrick Benedict (April 26, 1851 – October 24, 1922) was an American author of children's literature focusing on scientific topics, such as physiology, and an author of religious periodicals.

== Early life and education ==
Anne Kendrick Benedict was born to Asahel Clark and Anne Elizabeth (Hopkins) Kendrick in Rochester, New York. Anne Kendrick has one known sister, Florence. From the age of 15, Anne Kendrick attended Elmira Female College in Elmira, New York, obtaining a B.A in 1870. At her graduation, Anne Kendrick gave a commencement speech entitled Demosthenes and St. Paul.

== Personal life ==
Benedict married Wayland Benedict in 1873 and then moved to Cincinnati between July 1875 and December 1878. The Benedicts had six children: Mary, Wayland Clark, Howard, Florence, Stanley Rossiter Benedict, and Agnes. Their son Stanley became a noted chemist and developed Benedict's reagent. She attended what is now the Morning Star Baptist Church while living in Cincinnati.

She died in Cambridge, Massachusetts in 1922.

== Publications ==
Anne Kendrick Benedict was a writer of children's science and religious literature. Her most famous story, My Wonder-Story, was published by the Lothrop Company in 1888 and is about a mother who explores the anatomy and physiology of the human body with her children Jack and Florence. Another of her more popular publications includes The Hathaways' Sister, "a girl's [baptist] book about girls who are not unnaturally good nor bad." Some of her other works include Centa, The Child Violinist, The Island Story, The Fisherman's Daughter, The Enchanted Deer, The Home Circle (published April 18, 1883), and How We Are Made (published April 11, 1883).
