= Gandy Brodie =

American painter (1924 - 1975)

- Born: May 20, 1924; Brooklyn, New York
- Died: October 22, 1975 (aged 51)
- Known for: Painting
- Awards: Guggenheim Fellowship

Gandy Brodie (May 20, 1924 – October 22, 1975) was an American painter working primarily in New York City and Townshend, Vermont, during the middle part of the 20th century. He had ties to Abstract Expressionism through artists such as Willem de Kooning and his style, though singular, was considered second-generation Abstract Expressionism. His paintings were influenced by the works of artists such as Camille Corot, Paul Cézanne, Vincent van Gogh, Piet Mondrian, Chaïm Soutine, Georges Rouault, Pablo Picasso, and Paul Klee.

== Personal life ==
Gabriel Solomon Brodie was born May 20, 1924, in Brooklyn, New York, to a family of Romanian Jewish produce vendors. Brodie lived and worked in and around New York City throughout his life, while also spending extensive time in Florence, Italy, Provincetown, Massachusetts, and West Townshend, Vermont. He and his wife Jocelyn Brodie, are remembered for their establishment of The Gandy Brodie School of Art in Newfane, Vermont. Shane Brody, his only child, is a jazz and Americana guitarist who resides in Underhill, Vermont.

On October 22, 1975, Brodie died of a heart attack at age 51. A memorial for Brodie was held at The New School for Social Research, in New York City. Among the speakers were Meyer Shapiro and Elaine de Kooning.

== Career ==
Brodie started out as a self-taught painter, arriving at painting only after studying dance with Martha Graham and delving into the world of jazz and bebop. Once he discovered painting, he dedicated himself to learning from fellow artists and from works he could access in the museums of New York. After a time, he studied with Hans Hofmann and with the art historian, Meyer Schapiro, who praised Brodie as “one of the best painters of his generation.” Schapiro noted that, "Among the younger painters of nature, Gandy Brodie stands out by his stubbornly personal poetic art. His confrontations of places, persons and things are long‐brooded visions sustained by poignant memories and analogies evoked by his subjects."

He was the recipient of many awards, including a Guggenheim Fellowship, a National Council for The Arts Award, a Longview Foundation Purchase Grant, an Ingram Merrill Foundation Award, a Mark Twain Art award, and numerous residencies at colleges and universities nationwide. In addition, Brodie taught at Carnegie-Mellon University, The University of Pennsylvania and Elmira College, in Elmira New York, where he was a Fine Arts Instructor at the time of his death.

After his death, exhibitions of Brodie's art continued to be shown at the Steven Harvey, Sidney Janis, Knoedler, Edward Thorpe, and Salander - O'Rielly galleries. Brodie's work is currently represented by Steven Harvey Fine Art Project in New York City. Brodie’s paintings and drawings can be found in museum collections including the Yale University Art Gallery (New Haven, CT), Hirshhorn Museum and Sculpture Garden (Washington, D.C.), the Museum of Modern Art (New York, NY), the Metropolitan Museum of Art (New York, NY), the Neuberger Museum of Art (Purchase, NY), the Smithsonian American Art Museum (Washington, D.C.), The Phillips Collection (Washington, D.C.), and the Muscarelle Museum of Art (Williamsburg, Virginia)

== Artwork ==
Brodie’s work is characterized by dense, heavily impastoed layers of paint or drawn marks, culminating in an abstract, yet vivid encapsulation of everyday objects such as a flower in a can, a tree in the park, a sea gull over the ocean, or a tenement in New York City. He was known for painting and drawing certain subjects repeatedly throughout his relatively short career. Thematic elements in Brodie's art include still life paintings, urban and rural landscapes, and portraits or profiles of people. The subjects are often, at first glance, indiscernible from thick paint or charcoal marks; however, his reoccurring motifs become more recognizable once viewed in relation to his other works. Critic John Yau asserts that, "for all the scarred and pebbled toughness of their impasto skin, Brodie’s paintings come across as delicate and vulnerable"
