= WECW =

- Elmira, New York; United States
- Broadcast area: Elmira-Corning area
- Frequency: 107.7 MHz
- Branding: 107-7

Programming
- Format: Alternative rock, Top 40 (CHR)

Ownership
- Owner: Elmira College

History
- First air date: 1959
- Former call signs: WECW-FM

Technical information
- Licensing authority: FCC
- Facility ID: 19446
- Class: D
- ERP: 9 watts
- HAAT: -103.0 meters
- Transmitter coordinates: 42°5′48.00″N 76°49′0.00″W

Links
- Public license information: Public file; LMS
- Webcast: 107-7 Stream
- Website: wecw.elmira.edu

WECW (107.7 FM, "107-7") is a radio station broadcasting an Alternative - Top 40 (CHR) hybrid format. It is licensed to Elmira, New York, United States. The station is owned by Elmira College.
