= Quarry Farm =

Historic house in New York, United States

- U.S. National Register of Historic Places
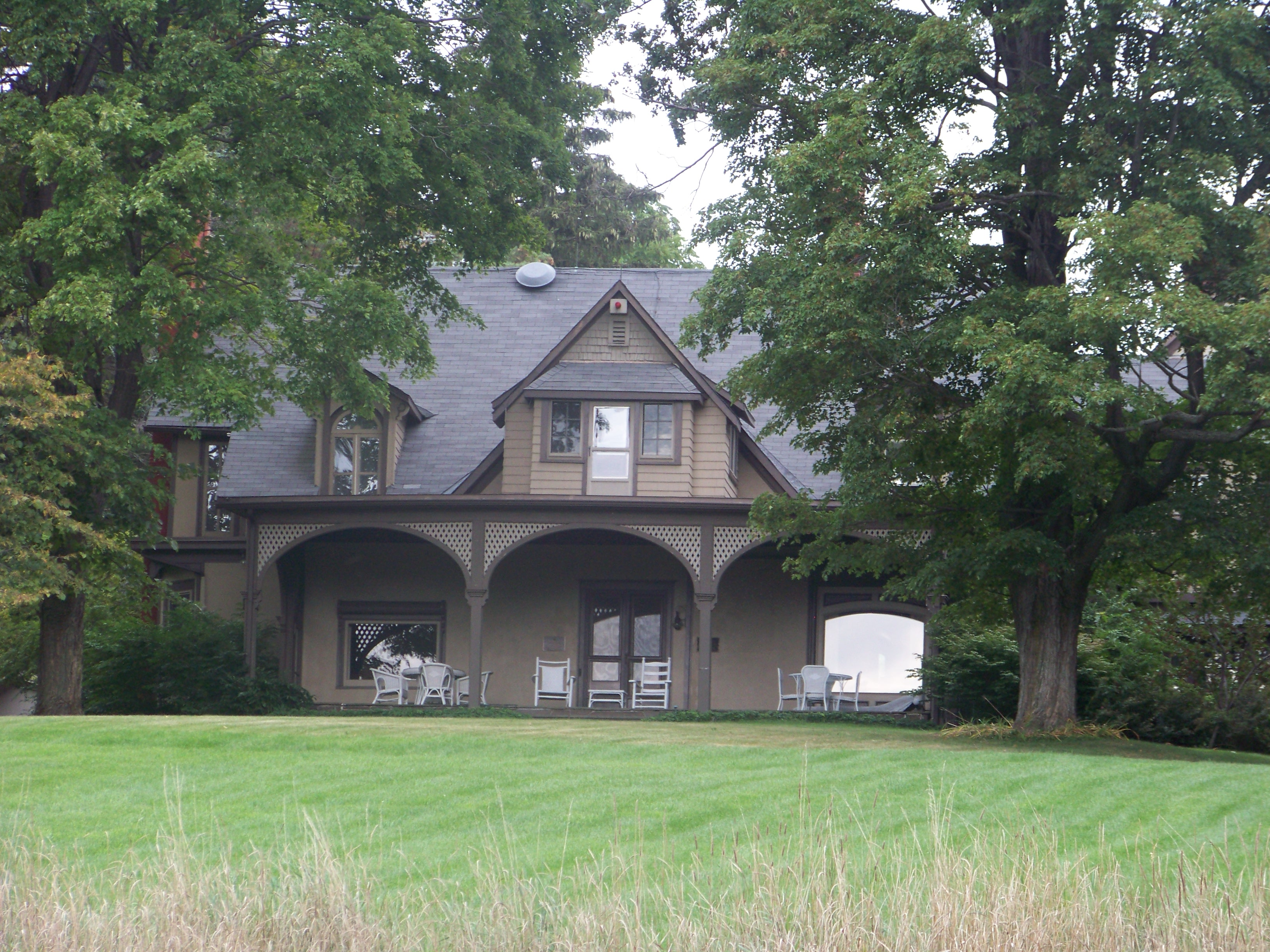

- Location within New York Location within the United States
- Location: Crane Rd., Elmira, New York
- Coordinates: 42°6′47″N 76°46′56″W
- Area: 255 acres (103 ha)
- Built: 1870
- NRHP reference No.: 75001177
- Added to NRHP: March 13, 1975

Quarry Farm is located on East Hill overlooking Elmira, New York, and the Chemung River Valley. In 1869, Jervis Langdon purchased the property as a vacation home for his family. When he died the following year, it was inherited by his eldest daughter, Susan Langdon Crane. It remained in the Langdon family until 1982, when it was donated to Elmira College as part of the founding of the Center For Mark Twain Studies.

Mark Twain (Samuel Clemens) was married to Susan Crane's younger sister, Olivia Langdon Clemens. During their courtship, Sam promised Livy that he would never allow her to feel the homesickness he felt, and from this promise emanated their annual summer pilgrimage to Quarry Farm.

All three of the Clemens' daughters would be born at Quarry Farm, and during the three decades the family regularly summered there, Twain composed many of his books and other literature, including Adventures of Huckleberry Finn. He wrote most of this work in an octagonal study built expressly for him by the Cranes about 200 yards (180 m) from the main house in 1874. That study was relocated to the campus of Elmira College in 1952.

As part of the stipulation of the gift, Quarry Farm is not open to the public, but is reserved exclusively for the use of scholars researching and writing about Twain and his circle. At least 10–15 of these Quarry Farm Fellows spend anywhere from a week to a month living in the house, surrounded by an extensive library of Twain-related materials, with access to the Mark Twain Archive at Elmira College, and assisted by the Center For Mark Twain Studies, which employs a full-time archivist and resident scholar.

It was listed on the National Register of Historic Places in 2008.
