= Anna Beach Pratt =

American educator and social worker

Anna Beach Pratt (June 5, 1867 – January 3, 1932) was an American educator and social services organizer who developed early school social work programs in Philadelphia public schools.

== Life ==
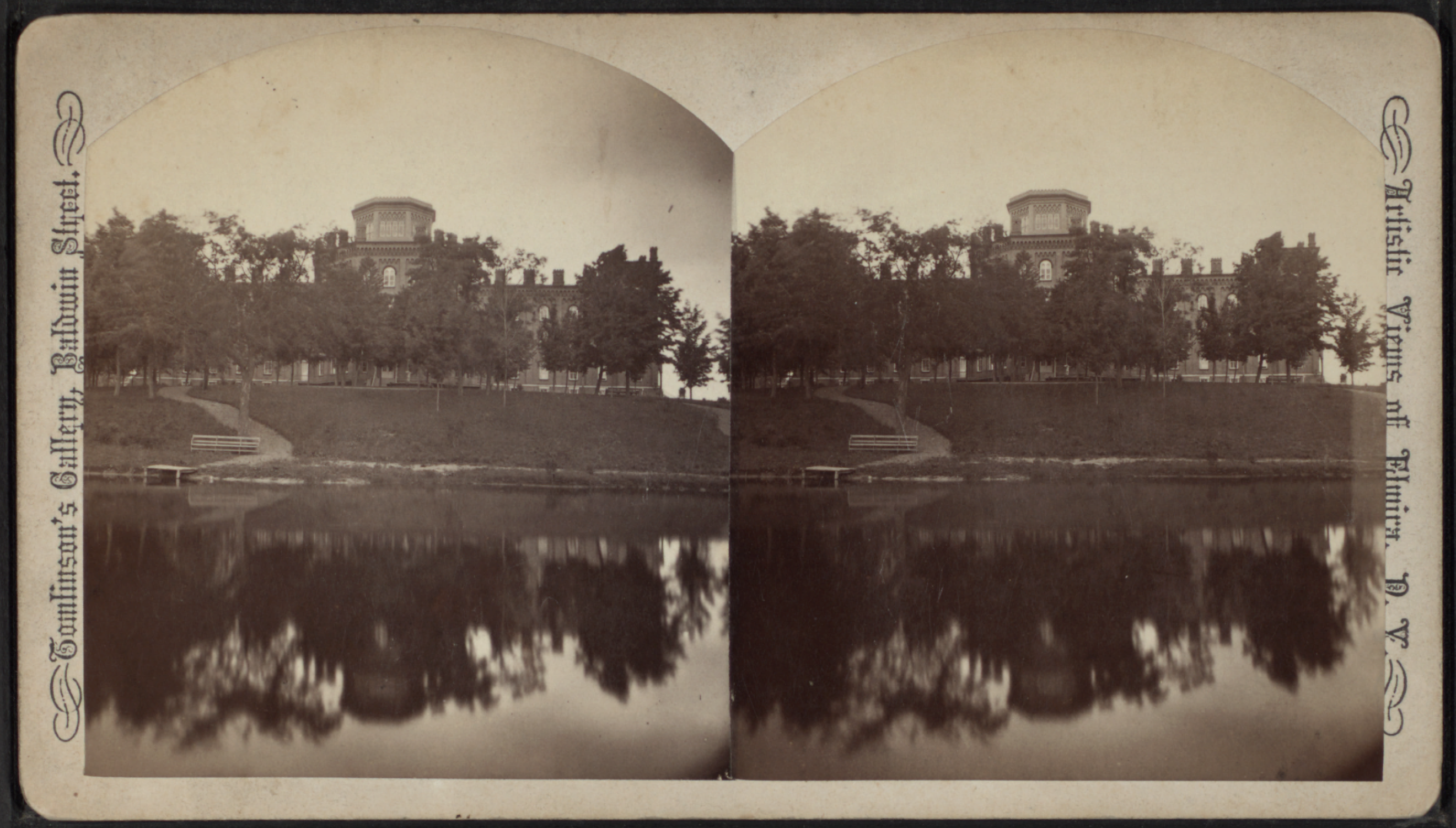
Elmira College in stereoscopic view, c. 1874-1890.

Anna Beach Pratt was born on June 5, 1867 in Elmira, New York. Her parents were Catherine Pratt (née Beach) and Timothy S. Pratt, a merchant. Though raised as a Presbyterian, Pratt converted to Quakerism and joined the Society of Friends later in life. Pratt graduated with a bachelor's degree from Elmira College in 1886. The next year, following a two-year post as a schoolteacher, she began working at Elmira College as a history professor. In 1887, at the age of 21, Pratt was elected to the board of trustees at Elmira College. The appointment of a young woman to the position was uncommon at that time. In 1899, Pratt was also working as a schoolteacher at the Saint Ursula School for Girls in Elmira. She continued teaching at Elmira College until at least 1900.

Sometime between 1900 and 1906, Pratt left full-time teaching to build an informal organization for poor, working women in Elmira. Dubbed "The Alpha Club", this group initially held their meetings at Pratt's home before expanding into their own clubhouse. Following the success of the Alpha Club, Pratt was selected as the city's overseer of the poor in 1906. Because the New York State Legislature would not allow women to serve in the position, Pratt's father Timothy S. Pratt was nominally elected to the position with the understanding that Anna would complete the work. Pratt formally studied social work in 1906 through a summer course at the New York School of Philanthropy in New York City.

Following her return to Elmira, Pratt became secretary of the new Bureau of Associated Relief. The organization merged with the Women's Federation in 1912 through Pratt's influence, becoming the Elmira Federation for Social Service. Pratt was appointed to lead the new organization. Social services in Elmira were centralized through Pratt's federation. Pratt herself interviewed up to sixty-seven clients per day to determine their needs. The federation utilized a formalized registration process unusual to social services at that time.

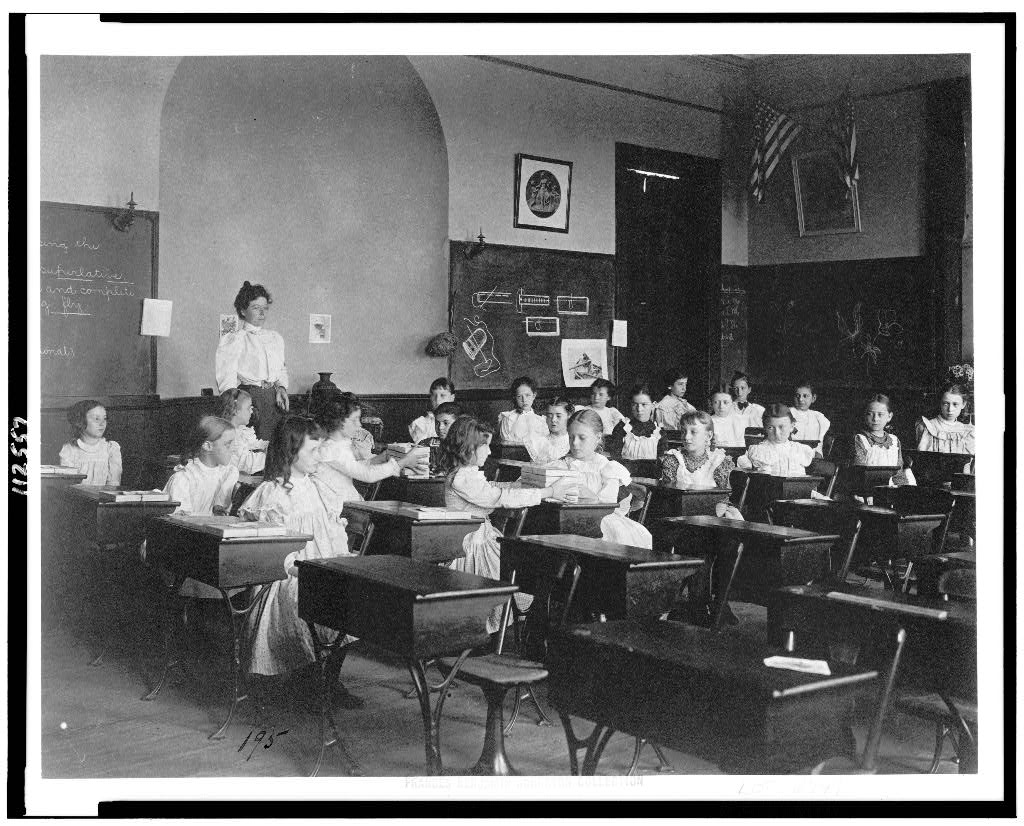
Young girls seated in an American classroom in 1899.

Pratt moved to Philadelphia to attend a graduate program at the University of Philadelphia. She graduated from the year-long program with a master's degree in 1916. Following her graduation, Pratt remained in Philadelphia and in 1918 found work at the William-White Foundation. She was appointed director of the organization in 1919. The mission of the William-White Foundation, under Pratt's direction, was to provide counseling and vocational training to students in the city. The foundation engaged in experimental school social work programs, such as placing social workers in public schools to provide support for troubled students. Pratt led the foundation until her death.

In 1929, Pratt was elected to the Philadelphia Board of Education. United States President Herbert Hoover's administration selected Pratt as one of approximately three thousand delegates to the White House Conference on Children in 1930.

Pratt became ill in the spring of 1931, cutting short a trip to Spain. Her health never recovered. On January 3, 1932, aged 64, Anna Beach Pratt died at her home in Philadelphia.
