= Louis J. Budd =

Louis J. Budd (1921–2010) was a James B. Duke Professor of English at Duke University, a literary critic and a leading Mark Twain scholar. He helped to develop and served as managing editor of the journal American Literature from 1986 to 1991.

== Biography ==
Budd was born Louis Budrewicz in St Louis, Missouri. His father was a Polish immigrant and his mother was Lithuanian. Budd earned a B.A. with Phi Beta Kappa honors and an M.A. from the University of Missouri. He served from 1942 to 1945 in the U.S. Air Force and then received his Ph.D. in 1949 from the University of Wisconsin, completing the PhD under the GI Bill. Budd spent the majority of his academic career at Duke University, teaching there from 1952 until his retirement in 1991. He was a member of the Mark Twain Society of America.

Budd married Isabelle Amelia Marx in 1945. The couple had two children, and remained married until Isabelle's death in 2006. Budd died in Patagonia, Arizona at the age of 89.

== Publications ==
Budd's publications included two monographs on Twain, Mark Twain: Social Philosopher (an account of Twain's social and political views) in 1962 and Our Mark Twain: The Making of His Public Personality in 1983. The many publications and papers of Louis J. Budd are archived in the library of Duke University.

== Awards and grants ==
Budd was awarded a Guggenheim fellowship in 1965–66, a Fulbright grant, and the 1998 Jay B. Hubbell medal from the Modern Language Association. He received a National Endowment for the Humanities Senior Fellowship in 1979–80.
