= Elmira College =

Private college in Elmira, New York, US

- Type: Private college
- Established: 1855; 171 years ago
- Endowment: $26.5 million (2023)
- President: John F. Dolan
- Academic staff: 49 FT / 58 PT
- Total staff: 282
- Students: 786 (Fall 2024)
- Undergraduates: 745 (Fall 2024)
- Postgraduates: 41 (Fall 2024)
- Location: Elmira, New York, United States; 42.0966°N 76.8160°W
- Campus: 42 acres (17 ha); Suburban
- Colors: Purple and gold
- Mascot: Soaring Eagle
- Website: elmira.edu

Elmira College is a private college in Elmira, New York, United States. Founded as a college for women in 1855, it is the oldest existing college granting degrees to women that were the equivalent of those given to men. Elmira College became coeducational in all of its programs in 1969. In fall 2024, the college has an enrollment of approximately 786 students.

The school's colors, purple and gold, are seen throughout the traditional campus, consisting mainly of buildings of the Victorian and Collegiate Gothic architectural styles. The colors purple and gold come from both the banners of the women's suffrage movement and the iris, the college flower.

The octagonal study in which Mark Twain wrote many of his most widely read novels is located on campus, as well as a research facility for Twain scholars.

== History ==
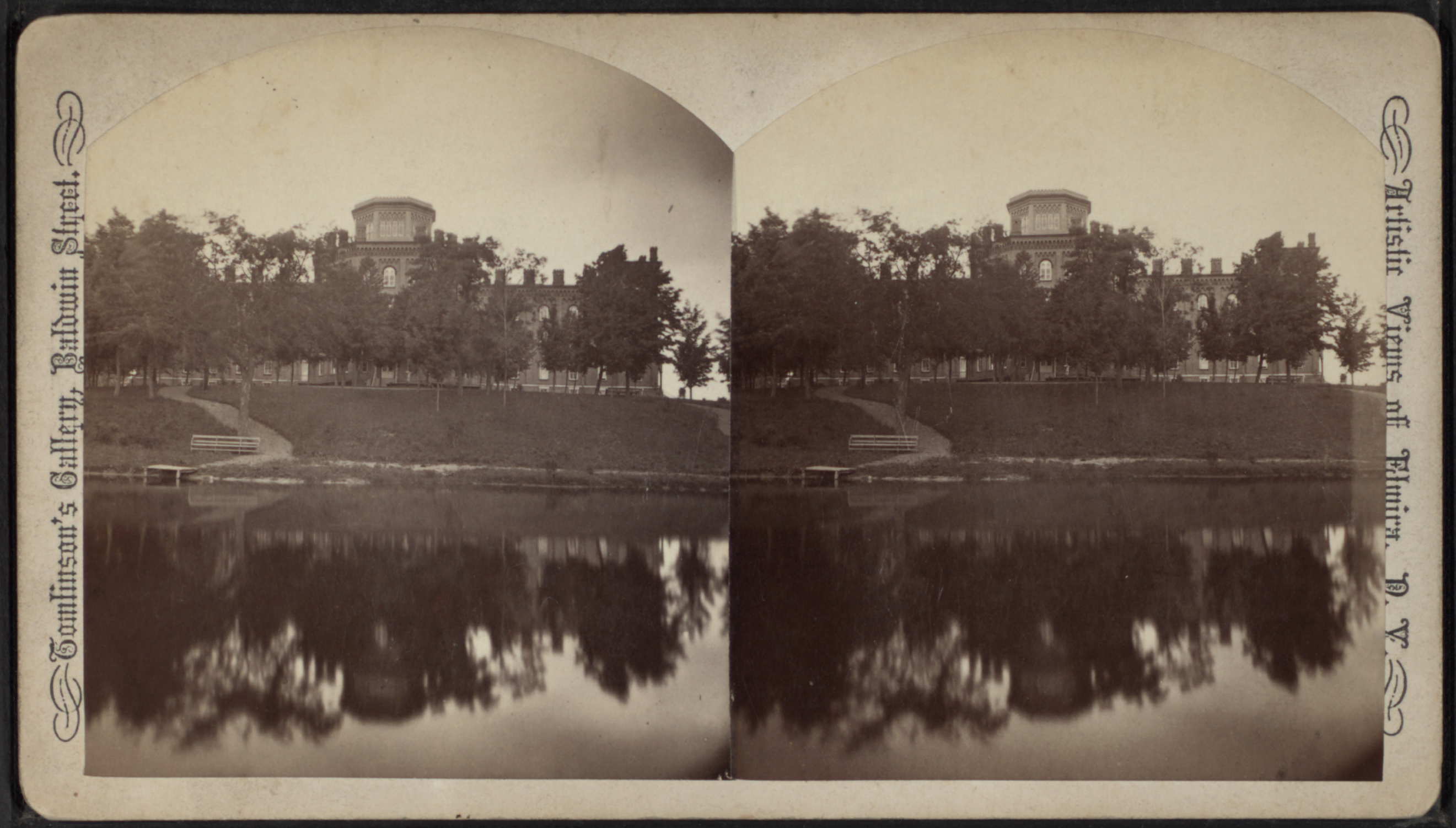
Elmira Female College c. 1874–90

According to Thomas Woody, Elmira College is "the oldest existing women's college in the United States which succeeded in attaining standards in a fair degree comparable with men's colleges at the very beginning of her career".

Alexander MacKenzie was suggested as a possibility for Elmira's next president. He told the board that he was in the process of raising $100,000 with $53,000 already raised. While he wanted to remain in Owego, he accepted the presidency.

Elmira College became coeducational in 1969.

In 1995, Elmira College was sanctioned by the American Association of University Professors "for infringement of governance standards".

=== 21st Century ===
Academic rankings

Baccalaureate
- Washington Monthly: 11

National
- Forbes: 626
- WSJ/College Pulse: 498

The college had a peak enrollment of approximately 1,200 students in 2014.

In 2016 the United States Department of Education determined the college had violated Title IX of the Education Amendments of 1972, for failure to promptly and equitably respond to complaints of sexual harassment and sexual violence. Specifically, the Office of Civil Rights investigation determined that in fifteen of the sixteen incidents reported at the college over three years, the college's response was either in violation of Title IX or another serious concern was raised.

== Buildings ==
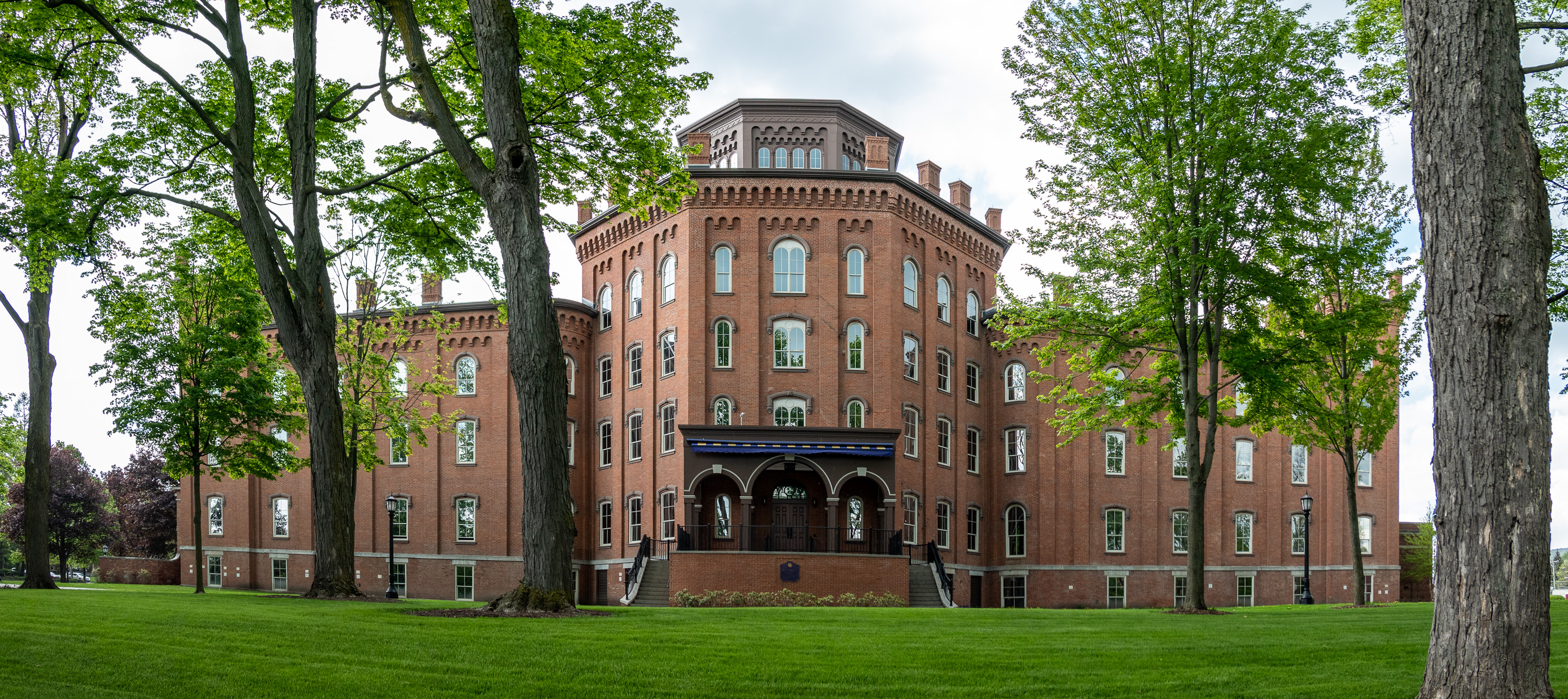
Cowles Hall, showing octagonal center

- Cowles Hall - The original building of the campus, built in 1855 and designed by a man named Farrar, has an octagonal center, seventy feet in diameter, and four arms in the shape of a Greek cross. Only three of these wings were built; the eastern and western arms were completed in 1855, while the northern arm was built in 1880. Its cornerstone, containing a copy of the college's charter and various other documents, was laid on July 6, 1854, during a ceremony. In 1882, construction on the north arm of Cowles Hall was completed. As the first building of the college, Cowles Hall served as a dormitory, dining hall, and classroom. On May 10, 1917, the building was dedicated to Augustus Cowles, the college's first president, and was given the name which remains today. Cowles Hall is listed on the National Register of Historic Places.
- Gillett Memorial Hall - Built in 1892, a gift of Solomon Gillett. It originally served as the college's music building, containing twenty-two teaching and practice rooms and pianos. It was proposed at a meeting in June 1891 and construction was completed the following year. In the past, the third floor held the Darius Ford Museum but currently, the building contains offices for faculty members of the college. Gillett Memorial Hall is listed on the National Register of Historic Places.

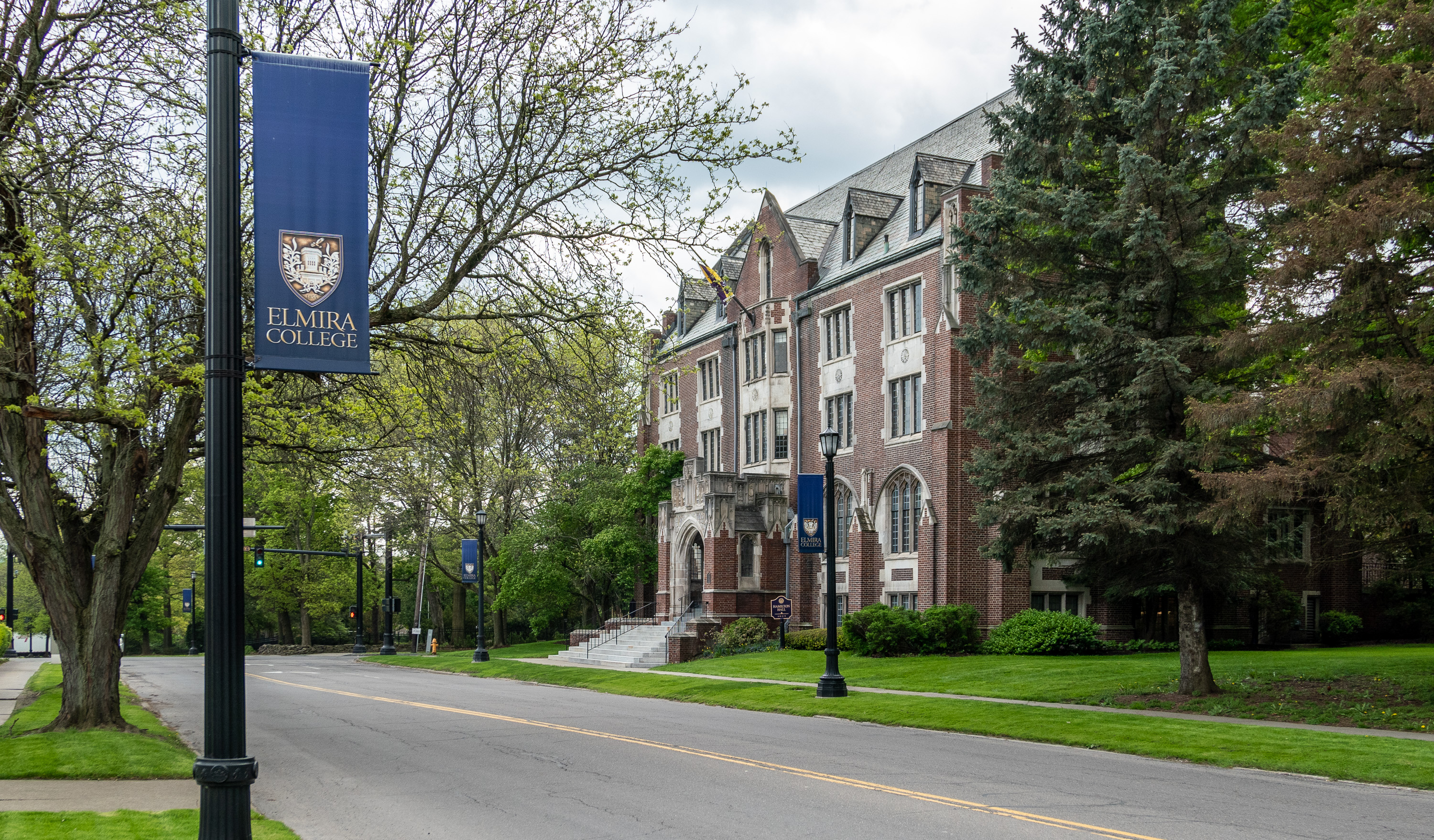
Hamilton Hall and College Avenue

- Hamilton Hall - Originally the site of the library completed in June 1927. It housed several thousand volumes previously owned by Jacob Fassett, and was the college's main library until 1969 when the Gannett-Tripp Library was built. Hamilton Hall is "cited as one of the finest examples of English Collegiate Gothic architecture in America" (Bulletin 7). Hamilton Hall is listed on the National Register of Historic Places.
- Murray Athletic Center - In January 1973, construction on the Murray Athletic Center was completed. Located several miles north of campus, the center is situated on two hundred thirty-five acres. Consisting of three geodesic domes, the Murray Athletic Center is the first geodesic-domed athletic complex in the world.

=== Dormitories ===
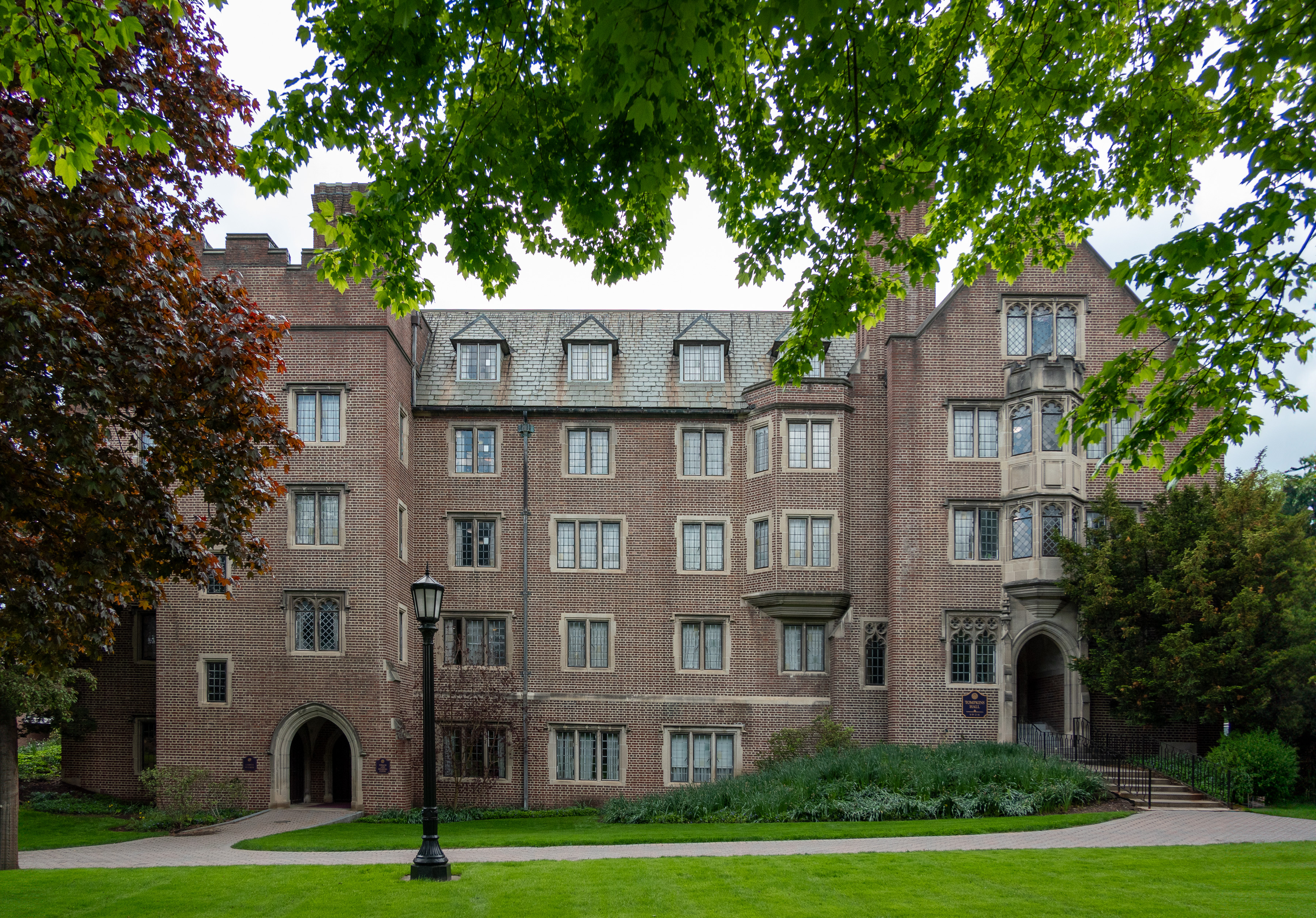
Tompkins Hall

- Tompkins Hall - Built in 1926 during Lent's presidency, this dormitory was the result of a fund drive for more buildings. It was given by Sarah Wey Tompkins, the wife of Ray Tompkins, a financier in Elmira. Tompkins Hall is listed on the National Register of Historic Places.
- College Cottages - Originally built as homes for faculty members in 1948, these four buildings now serve as upperclassmen apartment housing.
- Alumni Hall - This freshman dormitory was built in 1959 and is near Cowles Hall. It replaced Alumnae Hall, which was razed in 1977. It was briefly known as Main Street Dormitory in the late '70s and early '80s. This dormitory now houses both male and female students.
- Anderson Hall - This co-ed freshman dormitory, named for Douglass Anderson, an Elmira industrialist and trustee, was completed in 1960. It is next to Columbia Hall and the cottages.
- Columbia Hall - Located between Anderson Hall and the Gannett-Tripp Library, it is a freshman dorm. Columbia was completed in 1965 and was rededicated in 1992 by the prime minister of the Bahamas, Sir Lynden Pindling, for the 500th anniversary of the Columbus voyage.
- Perry Hall - Built in 1957, a co-ed dormitory named for a former Chairman of the Elmira College Board of Trustees, Charles Perry It is next to Tompkins Hall.
- Twin Towers - These residence halls were constructed in 1967 and 1968. Located adjacent to the Clarke Health Center and across from the campus center, these eight-story dorms have suites for five students and double rooms.
- Meier Hall - Completed in 2010 at a cost of $32.8 million, Meier Hall is named for the twelfth President of Elmira College, Thomas Keith Meier. Located next to the Gannett-Tripp Library. Gothic style architecture similar to Tompkins Hall, Hamilton Hall, and the Speidel Gymnasium. Co-ed dormitory with two penthouses, single rooms with adjoining baths, two triples with a kitchen and bath, and adjoining double rooms.

=== Academic buildings ===
- Harris Hall - Constructed as an academic building for $175,000 in 1950 and named for Dean Martha Harris. The dedication ceremony, held in October 1950, was attended by Harris, who was then ninety-four.
- Kolker Hall - Built in 1962 as the science hall. Today, several chemistry and biology labs are inside this building.

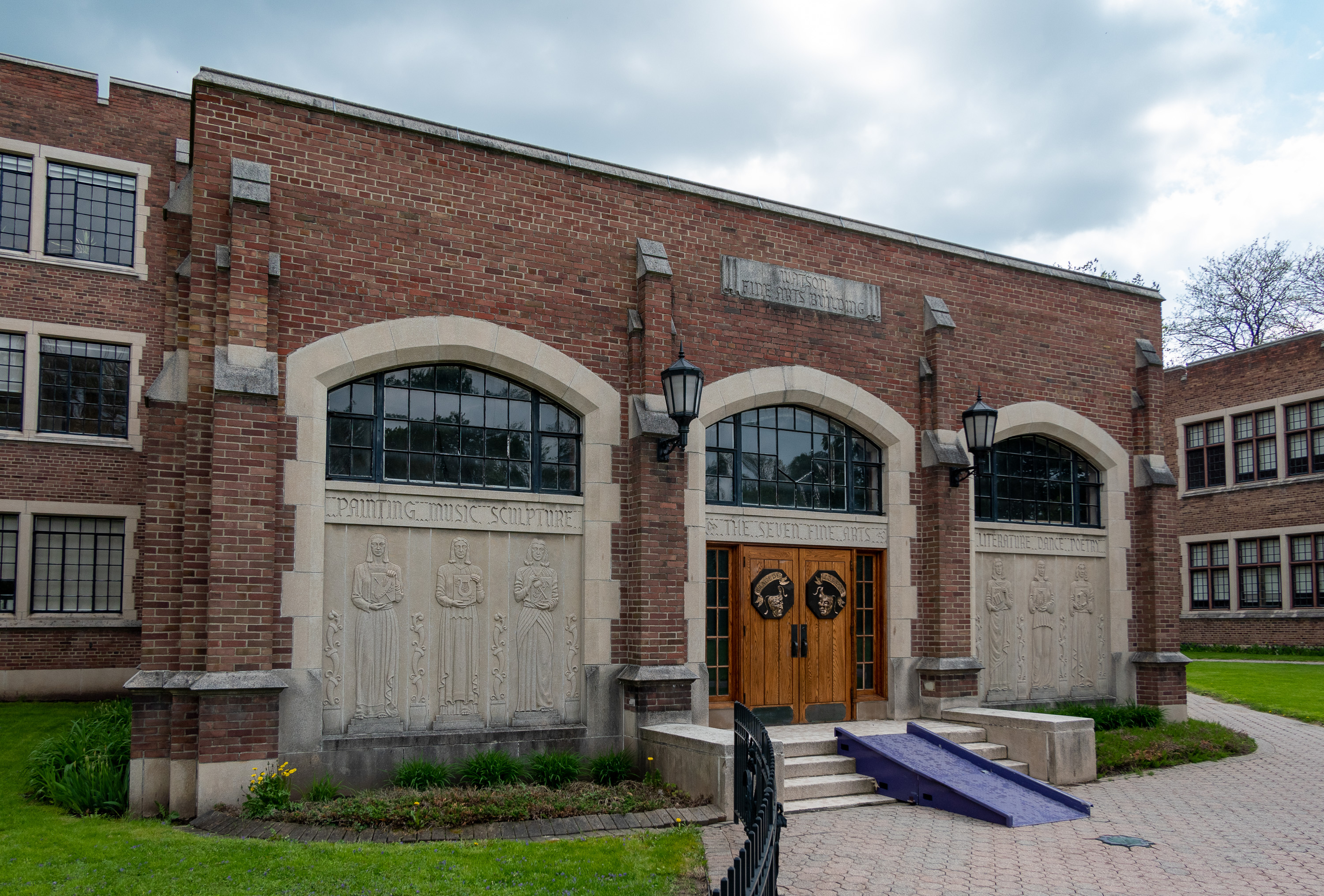
Watson Fine Arts Building

- Watson Fine Arts - Construction on this building was finished in 1958. Today it is used primarily by the music and math departments. There are practice rooms for piano students and a small black box theatre. The student-run radio station WECW was originally located in this building on the third floor before it was moved to the Campus Center in the mid-80s. This building was named for Mr. and Mrs. Thomas J. Watson.

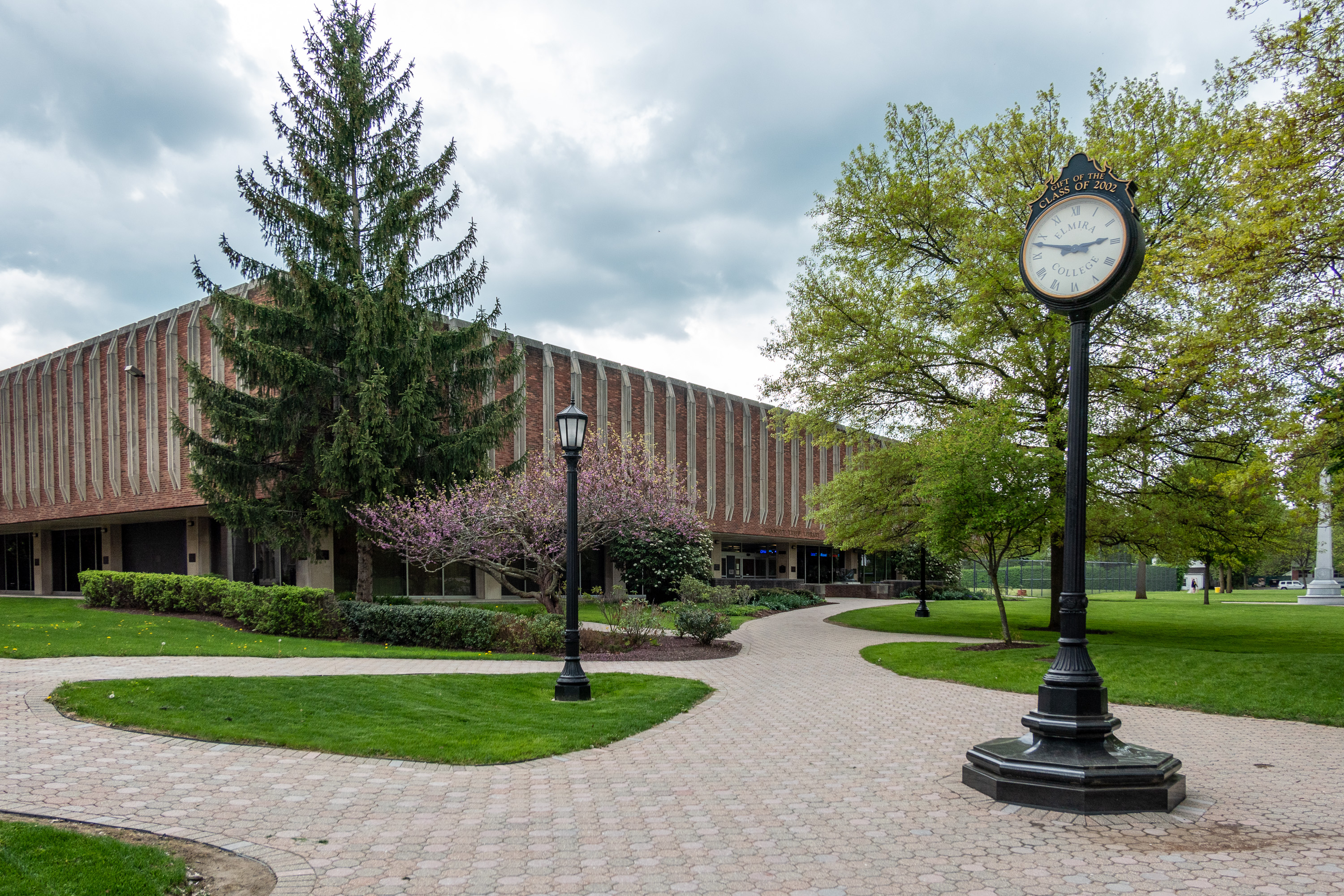
Gannett-Tripp Library

- Gannett-Tripp Library - The college library built in 1969. It has more than 300,000 books. The second floor of the library contains the Mark Twain Archive.
- Carnegie Hall - Constructed in 1911 with funds partially given by Andrew Carnegie. Carnegie was originally designated as the science building and today houses laboratories for the school's science and nursing programs. It is three stories tall and is located south of Gillett Memorial Hall and Alumni Hall. It underwent remodeling in 1963. Carnegie Hall is listed on the National Register of Historic Places.
- Fassett Commons - In 1916, Mr. and Mrs. Jacob Fassett donated $30,000 to the college for construction of a dining hall. It became the main dining hall in 1917. It is connected to the north arm of Cowles Hall. Faculty members of the art department have their offices in Fassett Commons, which is listed on the National Register of Historic Places.
- Speidel Gymnasium/Emerson Hall - This building is the site of the gymnasium, originally built in 1956 and renovated forty years later. Near the gymnasium, one can find several athletic offices, two racquetball courts, the Locke Pool, and the college fitness center. Emerson is home to the theatre program and includes a rehearsal hall, dance studio and Gibson Theatre, a 250-seat proscenium theatre.
- McGraw Hall - Located on Park Place, it is the main administration building of Elmira College. It was built in 1961 and named for Harold W. McGraw, a former Chairman of Elmira College's board of trustees. Several administrative and professors’ offices are located in this building.
  - Curtis McGraw Bookstore - Initially opened in 1961 as a gift in the memory of Curtis W. McGraw, president of the McGraw-Hill Companies in the early 1950s.
- President's Home - now serves as the Office of Admissions and Financial Aid.

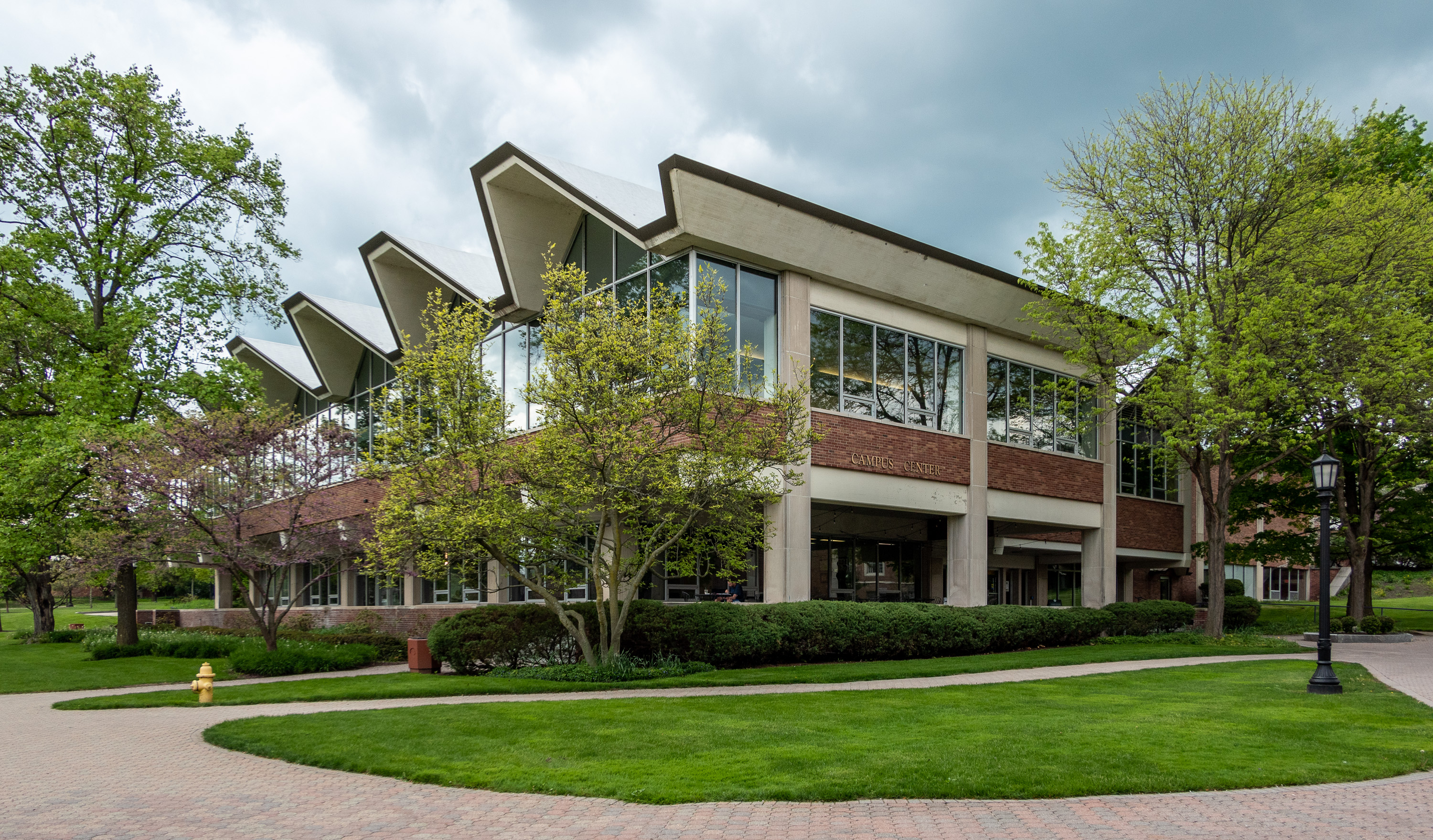
Campus Center

- Campus Center - Opened in 1965, this building contains the college's dining hall along with MacKenzie's, a renovated bowling alley, classrooms and Student Affairs offices. Also, the broadcasting booth of WECW is located in this building.
- Clarke Health Center - Built in 1975 and named for Harriet Pratt Clarke from the class of 1890.
- Mark Twain's Study - This building is in the shape of an octagon, similar to Cowles Hall. Originally existing at Quarry Farm, it now stands adjacent to Cowles Hall. The study was donated to the college in 1952 by Ida Langdon, Mark Twain's niece. Mark Twain's Study is listed on the National Register of Historic Places.
- Lowman Greenhouse - Built in 1942.

=== Former buildings ===
For eighty years, Elmira College possessed an observatory built by Professor Charles Farrar. Professor Farrar began buying telescopes for the observatory in 1859, and construction began in August 1859. The observatory first opened for use in April 1860 under the control of the Elmira Academy of Sciences. Twenty years later, control was transferred to Elmira College. Students would gather in the observatory for "dome parties". The domed building, which occupied a triangular plot fronting on Seventh Street, stood until 1939.

Alumnae Hall was built in 1917 as a sophomore dormitory.

== Athletics ==
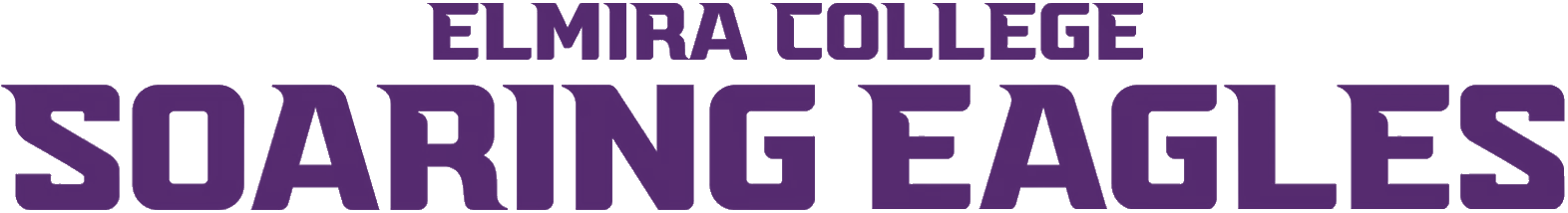
Elmira athletics wordmark

Elmira College is a member of the NCAA, New York State Women's Collegiate Athletic Association (NYSWCAA), ECAC, NEHC, and Empire 8. Their mascot is the Soaring Eagle. Men's sports include baseball, basketball, cross-country, golf, ice hockey, lacrosse, soccer, tennis and volleyball; while women's sports include basketball, cross-country, cheerleading, field hockey, golf, ice hockey, lacrosse, soccer, softball, tennis and volleyball. On July 15, 2020, the Empire 8 Conference postponed all fall sports, but will provide conference championships in those sports in Spring 2021.

The college will add both men's and women's wrestling as intercollegiate programs for the 2020–21 academic year. Elmira College sponsored men's wrestling in the early 1970s but the sport was later discontinued.

Elmira College holds several NCAA Division III National Championships in Women's Ice Hockey as well as in NCA Competitive Cheerleading. Elmira College is a member of the United Collegiate Hockey Conference (UCHC) which has postponed conference competition until January 1, 2021, due to the COVID pandemic.

== Notable alumni and former students ==
- Patty Abramson, venture capitalist
- Anne Kendrick Benedict, author of children's literature focusing on scientific topics
- M. Katharine Jones Bennett (1864 – 1950), American philanthropist and church leader
- Gandy Brodie (1924–1975), fine artist described as a "Second Generation Abstract Expressionist"
- Olivia Langdon Clemens, wife of Samuel Clemens (Mark Twain) and the daughter of Jervis Langdon, one of the college's founding trustees
- Chip Coffey, psychic and parapsychologist who has speaking tours with Patti Starr, Coffey was awarded a Pigasus Award "For the psychic who tricked the most people with the least effort".
- Lena Guilbert Ford, poet, and lyricist of the song "Keep The Home Fires Burning"
- Wilhelmina Holladay (1922–2021), art collector, co-founder of National Museum of Women in the Arts, Washington, D.C.
- Fay Kanin, screenwriter/play author/producer and former president of the Academy of Motion Picture Arts and Sciences from 1979 to 1983
- Harry Palmer, developer of the Avatar Course, a personal development system translated into 19 languages and taught in over 60 countries. Founder of Star's Edge, Inc.
- Mary Gray Peck (1867–1957; BA, 1889) journalist, suffragist, and clubwoman
- Annah G. Pettee (1874–1959) politician in Denver, Colorado
- Anna Beach Pratt, educator and social worker; elected to Elmira College's board of trustees in 1887
- Alice Robertson (1854–1931) first congresswoman from Oklahoma who supported the rights of Native Americans and opposed certain women's groups
- Emma Paddock Telford (1851–1920), writer
- Jane Meade Welch (1854–1931) journalist, lecturer
- Sheila Williams (born 1956) editor of Asimov's Science Fiction magazine

== See also ==
- Elmira College Old Campus

== Bibliography ==
- Barber, William Charles (1955). Elmira College: The First 100 Years. New York: McGraw Hill. LCCN 55–009100.
