= 2017–18 Merrimack Warriors women's ice hockey season =

- Conference: WHEA
- Home ice: Volpe Complex

Record
- Overall: 0-0-0
- Home: 0-0-0
- Road: 0-0-0

Coaches and captains
- Head coach: Erin Hamlen
- Assistant coaches: Jake Anderson; Steph Moberg
- Captain(s): Jessica Bonfe; Paige Voight

The Merrimack Warriors represent Merrimack College in the Women's Hockey East Association during the 2017–18 NCAA Division I women's ice hockey season.

== Standings ==
2017–18 WHEA standings
	Conference							Overall					
	GP	W	L	T	PTS	GF	GA	GP	W	L	T	GF	GA
#5 Boston College	24	19	2	3	41	98	46	38	30	5	3	155	76
Providence	24	12	7	5	29	67	55	37	17	13	7	96	80
Maine	24	11	9	4	26	54	52	38	19	14	5	91	83
#8 Northeastern	24	11	11	2	24	69	64	39	19	17	3	107	100
New Hampshire	24	9	10	5	23	45	57	36	14	15	7	79	85
Boston University	24	8	11	5	21	72	66	37	14	17	6	113	100
Connecticut	24	7	11	6	20	47	56	39	16	14	9	88	76
Vermont	24	7	13	4	18	46	67	35	10	20	5	67	99
Merrimack	24	6	16	2	14	41	76	34	11	20	3	62	96
Championship: † indicates conference regular season champion; * indicates conference tournament champion Rankings: USCHO.com

== Roster ==
=== 2017–18 Warriors ===
No.	Nat.	Player	Class	Pos	Height	DoB	Hometown	Previous team
1		Léa-Kristine Demers	Sophomore	G	5' 11" (1.8 m)		Repentigny, Quebec	College Saint-Jean Vianney
4		Felila Manu	Junior	D	5' 6" (1.68 m)		Anchorage, Alaska	Alaska All-Stars U-19
5		Paige Sorensen (A)	Junior	D	5' 7" (1.7 m)		Plymouth, Minnesota	Wayzata HS
6		Paige Voight (C)	Junior	F	5' 7" (1.7 m)		St. Michael, Minnesota	Cretin-Derham Hall
8		Baye Flanagan	Junior	D	5' 7" (1.7 m)		Billerica, Massachusetts	Northern Cyclones
9		Dominique Kremer	Junior	F	5' 6" (1.68 m)		West Fargo, North Dakota	Shattuck-St. Mary's
10		Meghan Martin	Junior	D	5' 4" (1.63 m)		Newport, Vermont	North American Hockey Academy
12		Emily Volpe	Junior	F	5' 6" (1.68 m)		Whitby, Ontario	Whitby Jr. Wolves
13		Mikyla Grant-Mentis	Sophomore	F	5' 6" (1.68 m)		Brampton, Ontario	Mississauga Jr. Chiefs
14		Jessica Kuhlman	Junior	F	5' 6" (1.68 m)		Severna Park, Maryland	Pittsburgh Penguins Elite
16		Maddie Burton	Freshman	F	5' 0" (1.52 m)		Aurora, Illinois	Chicago Mission
17		Jessica Bonfe (C)	Junior	F	5' 9" (1.75 m)		Woodbury, Minnesota	Hill-Murray HS
18		Katelyn Rae	Junior	F	5' 0" (1.52 m)		Courtice, Ontario	Whitby Wolves
19		Chloe Cook	Sophomore	D	5' 5" (1.65 m)		Summerland, British Columbia	Okanagan Hockey Academy
20		Andrea Olson	Sophomore	D	5' 6" (1.68 m)		Stillwater, Minnesota	Minnesota Revolution
21		Annie Boekers	Junior	F	5' 1" (1.55 m)		Otsego, Minnesota	Cretin-Derham Hall
23		Kate Bukolska	Freshman	F	5' 6" (1.68 m)		Prague, Czech Republic	Ottawa Lady Senators
24		Courtney Maud	Freshman	F	5' 6" (1.68 m)		Georgetown, Ontario	Stoney Creek Jr. Sabres
25		Madison Morey	Junior	F	5' 8" (1.73 m)		Fairbanks, Alaska	North American Hockey Academy
28		Megan Fergusson	Freshman	F	5' 8" (1.73 m)		Kitchener, Ontario	Kitchener-Waterloo Rangers
34		Samantha Ridgewell	Junior	G	5' 9" (1.75 m)		Outlook, Saskatchewan	Notre Dame Jr.
		Maddie Santosuosso		G	4' 10" (1.47 m)		Topsfield, Massachusetts

== Schedule ==
Date	Opponent^{#}	Rank^{#}	Site	Decision	Result	Record
Regular Season
September 23	at Boston University		Walter Brown Arena • Boston, MA	Samantha Ridgewell	W 2-1	1–0–0 (1–0–0)
September 29	at #3 Minnesota*		Ridder Arena • Minneapolis, MN	Léa-Kristine Demers	W 4-3	2-0-0
October 1	at Minnesota*		Ridder Arena • Minneapolis, MN			
October 6	at New Hampshire		Whittemore Center • Durham, NH			
October 7	New Hampshire		Volpe Complex • North Andover, MA			
October 13	St. Lawrence*		Volpe Complex • North Andover, MA			
October 14	St. Lawrence*		Volpe Complex • North Andover, MA			
October 20	Penn State*		Volpe Complex • North Andover, MA			
October 21	Penn State*		Volpe Complex • North Andover, MA			
October 27	Vermont		Volpe Complex • North Andover, MA			
October 28	Vermont		Volpe Complex • North Andover, MA			
November 3	at Union*		Achilles Center • Schenectady, NY			
November 4	at Union*		Achilles Center • Schenectady, NY			
November 11	Northeastern		Volpe Complex • North Andover, MA			
November 12	at Northeastern		Matthews Arena • Boston, MA			
November 17	Providence		Volpe Complex • North Andover, MA			
November 18	at Providence		Schneider Arena • Providence, RI			
November 24	Princeton*		Volpe Complex • North Andover, MA			
November 25	Princeton*		Volpe Complex • North Andover, MA			
December 8	at Boston College		Kelley Rink • Chestnut Hill, MA			
December 9	Boston College		Volpe Complex • North Andover, MA			
January 2, 2018	Boston College		Volpe Complex • North Andover, MA			
January 5	Connecticut		Volpe Complex • North Andover, MA			
January 10	New Hampshire		Volpe Complex • North Andover, MA			
January 13	Maine		Volpe Complex • North Andover, MA			
January 19	at Maine		Alfond Arena • Orono, ME			
January 20	at Maine		Alfond Arena • Orono, ME			
January 25	Boston University		Volpe Complex • North Andover, MA			
January 27	at Boston University		Walter Brown Arena • Boston, MA			
February 2	at Providence		Schneider Arena • Providence, RI			
February 4	at Vermont		Gutterson Fieldhouse • Burlington, VT			
February 10	Northeastern		Volpe Complex • North Andover, MA			
February 16	at Connecticut		Freitas Ice Forum • Storrs, CT			
February 17	at Connecticut		Freitas Ice Forum • Storrs, CT			
*Non-conference game. ^{#}Rankings from USCHO.com Poll.
