= 2017–18 Boston College Eagles women's ice hockey season =

- Conference: WHEA
- Home ice: Kelley Rink

Rankings
- USA Today/USA Hockey Magazine: 5th
- USCHO.com: 5th

Record
- Overall: 30–5–3 (19–2–3 in WHEA play)
- Home: 17–3–1
- Road: 13–1–2
- Neutral: 0–1–0

Coaches and captains
- Head coach: Katie King-Crowley
- Assistant coaches: Courtney Kennedy; Courtney Sheary
- Captain(s): Kenzie Kent; Makenna Newkirk
- Alternate captain: Katie Burt

The Boston College Eagles represent Boston College in Women's Hockey East Association play during the 2017–18 NCAA Division I women's ice hockey season.

== Offseason ==
- May 5: Megan Keller and Kali Flanagan were named to the US Women's National Team representing the US in the 2018 Olympics. Both players will take a leave of absence from Boston College for the 2017-18 school year. They will be joined by alumni Alex Carpenter and Emily Pfalzer.

=== Recruiting ===
| Player | Position | Nationality | Notes |
| Cayla Barnes | Defense | United States | Played with US National team as a 17-year old |
| Maegan Beres | Forward | Canada | Selected to Team Canada U18 |
| Willow Corson | Forward | Canada | One of two recruits from the Mississauga Jr. Chiefs |
| Daryl Watts | Forward | Canada | Teammate of Corson's and member of Team Canada U18 |

== Standings ==
2017–18 WHEA standings
| | Conference | | | | | | | Overall | | | | | |
| | GP | W | L | T | PTS | GF | GA | GP | W | L | T | GF | GA |
|---|---|---|---|---|---|---|---|---|---|---|---|---|---|
| #5 Boston College | 24 | 19 | 2 | 3 | 41 | 98 | 46 | 38 | 30 | 5 | 3 | 155 | 76 |
| Providence | 24 | 12 | 7 | 5 | 29 | 67 | 55 | 37 | 17 | 13 | 7 | 96 | 80 |
| Maine | 24 | 11 | 9 | 4 | 26 | 54 | 52 | 38 | 19 | 14 | 5 | 91 | 83 |
| #8 Northeastern | 24 | 11 | 11 | 2 | 24 | 69 | 64 | 39 | 19 | 17 | 3 | 107 | 100 |
| New Hampshire | 24 | 9 | 10 | 5 | 23 | 45 | 57 | 36 | 14 | 15 | 7 | 79 | 85 |
| Boston University | 24 | 8 | 11 | 5 | 21 | 72 | 66 | 37 | 14 | 17 | 6 | 113 | 100 |
| Connecticut | 24 | 7 | 11 | 6 | 20 | 47 | 56 | 39 | 16 | 14 | 9 | 88 | 76 |
| Vermont | 24 | 7 | 13 | 4 | 18 | 46 | 67 | 35 | 10 | 20 | 5 | 67 | 99 |
| Merrimack | 24 | 6 | 16 | 2 | 14 | 41 | 76 | 34 | 11 | 20 | 3 | 62 | 96 |
Championship: † indicates conference regular season champion; * indicates conference tournament champion Rankings: USCHO.com

== Roster ==
=== 2017–18 Eagles ===
| No. | Nat. | Player | Class | Pos | Height | DoB | Hometown | Previous team |
|---|---|---|---|---|---|---|---|---|
| 1 | | Molly Barrow | Sophomore | G | 5' 8" (1.73 m) | | Belmont, Massachusetts | East Coast Wizards |
| 2 | | Grace Bizal | Junior | D | 5' 5" (1.65 m) | | Minnetonka, Minnesota | Minnesota Jr. Whitecaps |
| 3 | | Serena Somerfield | Junior | D | 5' 9" (1.75 m) | | Greenwich, Connecticut | Mid Fairfield CT Stars |
| 7 | | Maegan Beres | Freshman | F | 5' 7" (1.7 m) | | Whistler, British Columbia | Team Canada U18 |
| 8 | | Rachel Moore | Sophomore | F | 5' 9" (1.75 m) | | Falmouth, Massachusetts | Bay State Breakers |
| 9 | | Daryl Watts | Freshman | D | 5' 6" (1.68 m) | | Toronto, Ontario | Team Canada U18 |
| 11 | | Caitrin Lonergan | Sophomore | F | 5' 7" (1.7 m) | | Roslindale, Massachusetts | Mid-Fairfield Connecticut Stars |
| 12 | | Kenzie Kent (C) | Senior | F | 5' 6" (1.68 m) | | Norwell, Massachusetts | Noble and Greenough |
| 14 | | Molly Slowe | Junior | F | 5' 6" (1.68 m) | | Medfield, Massachusetts | Assabet Valley U19 |
| 15 | | Erin Connolly | Sophomore (RS) | F | 5' 7" (1.7 m) | | South Boston, Massachusetts | Assabet Valley U19 |
| 17 | | Delaney Belinskas | Sophomore | F | 5' 8" (1.73 m) | | Port Orange, Florida | Mass. Spitfires |
| 18 | | Toni Ann Miano | Senior | D | 5' 4" (1.63 m) | | Bronx, New York | North American Hockey Academy |
| 19 | | Makenna Newkirk (C) | Junior | F | 5' 7" (1.7 m) | | Scottsdale, Arizona | Southern CT Stars U19 |
| 20 | | Ryan Little | Junior | F | 5' 7" (1.7 m) | | Guilford, Vermont | Shattuck-St. Mary's |
| 21 | | Bridget McCarthy | Sophomore | F | 5' 6" (1.68 m) | | Pembroke, Massachusetts | Mass. Spitfires |
| 23 | | Cayla Barnes | Freshman | D | 5' 1" (1.55 m) | | Eastvale, California | Team USA |
| 24 | | Kate Annese | Sophomore | D/F | 5' 6" (1.68 m) | | Needham, Massachusetts | Mid-Fairfield Connecticut Stars |
| 25 | | Caroline Ross | Sophomore | D | 5' 7" (1.7 m) | | Rochester, New York | North American Hockey Academy |
| 27 | | Willow Corson | Freshman | F | 5' 9" (1.75 m) | | Toronto, Ontario | Mississauga Jr. Chiefs |
| 28 | | Kathleen McNamara | Junior | D | 5' 7" (1.7 m) | | Montville, New Jersey | New Jersey Rockets U19 |
| 32 | | Gabri Switaj | Senior | G | 5' 3" (1.6 m) | | Kent, Ohio | Culver Academy |
| 33 | | Katie Burt (A) | Senior | G | 5' 6" (1.68 m) | | Lynn, Massachusetts | Buckingham, Brown and Nichols |

== Schedule ==
| Date | Opponent^{#} | Rank^{#} | Site | Decision | Result | Record |
Regular Season
| October 5 | #4 Minnesota-Duluth* | #3 | Kelley Rink • Chestnut Hill, MA | Katie Burt | W 4-3 | 1–0–0 |
| October 6 | #4 Minnesota-Duluth* | #3 | Kelley Rink • Chestnut Hill, MA | Katie Burt | W 4-1 | 2–0–0 |
| October 17 | Quinnipiac* | #3 | Kelley Rink • Chestnut Hill, MA | Katie Burt | W 4-2 | 3–0–0 |
| October 20 | at Connecticut | #3 | Freitas Ice Forum • Storrs, CT | Katie Burt | T 2-2 ^{OT} | 3–0–1 (0–0–1) |
| October 22 | at Vermont | #3 | Gutterson Fieldhouse • Burlington, VT | Katie Burt | W 4-2 | 4–0–1 (1–0–1) |
| October 28 | at Boston University | #3 | Walter Brown Arena • Boston, MA | Katie Burt | W 4-3 | 5–0–1 (2–0–1) |
| October 29 | Maine | #3 | Kelley Rink • Chestnut Hill, MA | Katie Burt | W 7-2 | 6–0–1 (3–0–1) |
| November 3 | #9 Providence | #2 | Kelley Rink • Chestnut Hill, MA | Katie Burt | W 7-4 | 7–0–1 (4–0–1) |
| November 4 | at Syracuse* | #2 | Tennity Ice Skating Pavilion • Syracuse, NY | Katie Burt | W 4-3 | 8–0–1 |
| November 10 | at #8 St. Lawrence* | #2 | Appleton Arena • Canton, NY | Katie Burt | L 1-2 | 8–1–1 |
| November 11 | at #8 St. Lawrence* | #2 | Appleton Arena • Canton, NY | Katie Burt | W 6-3 | 9–1–1 |
| November 17 | Connecticut | #2 | Kelley Rink • Chestnut Hill, MA | Katie Burt | W 3-0 | 10–1–1 (5–0–1) |
| November 18 | at Connecticut | #2 | Freitas Ice Forum • Storrs, CT | Katie Burt | T 3-3 ^{OT} | 10–1–2 (5–0–2) |
| November 22 | at Harvard* | #3 | Bright-Landry Hockey Center • Allston, MA | Katie Burt | W 8-1 | 11–1–2 |
| November 28 | Northeastern | #2 | Kelley Rink • Chestnut Hill, MA | Katie Burt | W 7-3 | 12–1–2 (6–0–2) |
| December 1 | Boston University | #2 | Kelley Rink • Chestnut Hill, MA | Katie Burt | T 2-2 ^{OT} | 12–1–3 (6–0–3) |
| December 2 | at Boston University | #2 | Walter Brown Arena • Boston, MA | Katie Burt | W 4-2 | 13–1–3 (7–0–3) |
| December 8 | Merrimack | #2 | Kelley Rink • Chestnut Hill, MA | Katie Burt | W 4-1 | 14–1–3 (8–0–3) |
| December 9 | at Merrimack | #2 | Volpe Complex • North Andover, MA | Katie Burt | W 4-2 | 15–1–3 (9–0–3) |
| January 2, 2018 | at Merrimack | #2 | Volpe Complex • North Andover, MA | Katie Burt | W 7-3 | 16–1–3 (10–0–3) |
| January 5 | New Hampshire | #2 | Kelley Rink • Chestnut Hill, MA | Katie Burt | W 6-0 | 17–1–3 (11–0–3) |
| January 7 | at New Hampshire | #2 | Whittemore Center • Durham, NH | Katie Burt | W 5-1 | 18–1–3 (12–0–3) |
| January 12 | Northeastern | #2 | Kelley Rink • Chestnut Hill, MA | Katie Burt | L 2-4 | 18–2–3 (12–1–3) |
| January 13 | at Northeastern | #2 | Matthews Arena • Boston, MA | Katie Burt | W 5-4 ^{OT} | 19–2–3 (13–1–3) |
| January 16 | Harvard* | #2 | Kelley Rink • Chestnut Hill, MA | Katie Burt | W 6-2 | 20–2–3 |
| January 19 | Vermont | #2 | Kelley Rink • Chestnut Hill, MA | Katie Burt | W 3-2 ^{OT} | 21–2–3 (14–1–3) |
| January 20 | Vermont | #2 | Kelley Rink • Chestnut Hill, MA | Katie Burt | W 2-1 | 22–2–3 (15–1–3) |
| January 26 | #10 Providence | #3 | Kelley Rink • Chestnut Hill, MA | Katie Burt | W 5-0 | 23–2–3 (16–1–3) |
| January 27 | at #10 Providence | #3 | Schneider Arena • Providence, RI | Katie Burt | W 3-2 | 24–2–3 (17–1–3) |
| February 6 | Northeastern* | #3 | Kelley Rink • Chestnut Hill, MA (Beanpot, Opening Round) | Katie Burt | W 5-2 | 25–2–3 |
| February 9 | New Hampshire | #3 | Kelley Rink • Chestnut Hill, MA | Katie Burt | L 1-2 | 25–3–3 (17–2–3) |
| February 13 | Boston University | #4 | Kelley Rink • Chestnut Hill, MA (Beanpot Championship) | Katie Burt | W 4-3 ^{OT} | 26–3–3 |
| February 16 | at #10 Maine | #4 | Alfond Arena • Orono, ME | Katie Burt | W 5-0 | 27–3–3 (18–2–3) |
| February 16 | at #10 Maine | #4 | Alfond Arena • Orono, ME | Katie Burt | W 3-1 | 28–3–3 (19–2–3) |
WHEA Tournament
| February 23 | Vermont* | #3 | Kelley Rink • Chestnut Hill, MA (Quarterfinals, Game 1) | Katie Burt | W 3-1 | 29–3–3 |
| February 24 | Vermont* | #3 | Kelley Rink • Chestnut Hill, MA (Quarterfinals, Game 2) | Katie Burt | W 6-1 | 30–3–3 |
| March 3 | vs. Connecticut* | #3 | Matthews Arena • Boston, MA (Semifinal Game) | Katie Burt | L 2-4 | 30–4–3 |
NCAA Tournament
| March 10 | #6 Ohio State* | #4 | Kelley Rink • Chestnut Hill, MA (Quarterfinal Game) | Katie Burt | L 0-2 | 30–5–3 |
*Non-conference game. ^{#}Rankings from USCHO.com Poll.

== Awards and honors ==
- Daryl Watts, National Rookie of the Month Award, January 2018
- Daryl Watts, 2018 Boston College Athletics Female Rookie of the Year Award
- Daryl Watts, 2018 Cammi Granato Award, awarded to Women's Hockey East Player of the Year
- Daryl Watts, 2018 Hockey East Rookie of the Year
- Daryl Watts, 2017-18 First Team Hockey East
- Daryl Watts, 2018 Patty Kazmaier Award

=== All-America status ===
- Daryl Watts, 2018 First-Team All-America selection
- Caitrin Lonergan, 2018 Second-Team All-America selection
- Toni Ann Miano, 2018 Second-Team All-America selection
