= 2017–18 Northeastern Huskies women's ice hockey season =

- Conference: WHEA
- Home ice: Matthews Arena

Rankings
- USA Today/USA Hockey Magazine: 8
- USCHO.com: 8

Record
- Overall: 2–1–1
- Home: 1–1–1
- Road: 1–0–0
- Neutral: 0–0–0

Coaches and captains
- Head coach: Dave Flint
- Assistant coaches: Jeff Pellegrini; Nick Carpenito
- Captain: Shelby Herrington
- Alternate captain(s): Ainsley MacMillan; McKenna Brand; Christina Zalewski

The Northeastern Huskies represent Northeastern University in the Women's Hockey East Association during the 2017–18 NCAA Division I women's ice hockey season.

== Off-Season ==
Kendall Coyne ('16) was named to the US National Women's Team for 2017–18. She will relocate to the Tampa, FL area in September to train with the team for the 2018 Olympics.

== Standings ==
2017–18 WHEA standings
	Conference							Overall					
	GP	W	L	T	PTS	GF	GA	GP	W	L	T	GF	GA
#5 Boston College	24	19	2	3	41	98	46	38	30	5	3	155	76
Providence	24	12	7	5	29	67	55	37	17	13	7	96	80
Maine	24	11	9	4	26	54	52	38	19	14	5	91	83
#8 Northeastern	24	11	11	2	24	69	64	39	19	17	3	107	100
New Hampshire	24	9	10	5	23	45	57	36	14	15	7	79	85
Boston University	24	8	11	5	21	72	66	37	14	17	6	113	100
Connecticut	24	7	11	6	20	47	56	39	16	14	9	88	76
Vermont	24	7	13	4	18	46	67	35	10	20	5	67	99
Merrimack	24	6	16	2	14	41	76	34	11	20	3	62	96
Championship: † indicates conference regular season champion; * indicates conference tournament champion Rankings: USCHO.com

== Roster ==
=== 2017–18 Huskies ===
No.	Nat.	Player	Class	Pos	Height	DoB	Hometown	Previous team
2		Lauren Kelly	Senior	D	5' 6" (1.68 m)		Watertown, Massachusetts	Winchendon School
3		Morgan Crane	Junior	F	5' 10" (1.78 m)		Northfield, Illinois	Chicago Young Americans
4		Codie Cross	Sophomore	D	5' 3" (1.6 m)		Airdrie, Alberta	Team Canada U-18
6		Shelby Herrington (C)	Senior	D	6' 1" (1.85 m)		Bow, New Hampshire	Bishop Brady
7		McKenna Brand (A)	Senior	F	5' 6" (1.68 m)		Nevis, Minnesota	North American Hockey Academy
8		Andrea Renner	Sophomore	F	5' 4" (1.63 m)		Arlington Heights, Illinois	Chicago Young Americans
9		Lauren MacInnis	Freshman	D	5' 8" (1.73 m)		St. Louis, Missouri	Madison Capitols
10		Brooke Hobson	Freshman	D	5' 6" (1.68 m)		Prince Albert, Saskatchewan	Team Canada U18
11		Christina Zalewski (A)	Senior	F	5' 4" (1.63 m)		Canonsburg, Pennsylvania	Williston Nothampton
16		Matti Hartman	Sophomore	F	5' 8" (1.73 m)		Etna, New Hampshire	Team USA U-18
17		Bailey Coyne	Sophomore	F	5' 3" (1.6 m)		Palos Heights, Illinois	Mid-Fairfield CT Stars
18		Veronika Pettey	Freshman	F	5' 4" (1.63 m)		Potomac, Maryland	Washington Pride
19		Tori Sullivan	Junior (RS)	F	5' 4" (1.63 m)		West Bloomfield, Michigan	Boston College
21		Paige Capistran	Sophomore	F	5' 4" (1.63 m)		Manchester, New Hampshire	Mid-Fairfield CT Stars
22		Skylar Fontaine	Freshman	D	5' 4" (1.63 m)		East Greenwich, Rhode Island	Belle Tire
23		Kate Cipra	Freshman	F	5' 5" (1.65 m)		Western Springs, Illinois	Chicago Mission
26		Taytum Clairmont	Junior (RS)	F	5' 4" (1.63 m)		Waterloo, Ontario	Toronto Aeros
27		Maddie Hartman	Junior	D	5' 7" (1.7 m)		Deer Park, Illinois	Chicago Young Americans
30		Brianna Storms	Junior	G	5' 5" (1.65 m)		Sabin, Minnesota	Moorhead HS
33		Aerin Frankel	Freshman	G	5' 5" (1.65 m)		Briarcliff Manor, New York	Shattuck-St. Mary's
37		Kasidy Anderson	Junior	F	5' 10" (1.78 m)		Shaker Heights, Ohio	Shaker Heights HS
39		Brittany Bugalski	Junior	G	5' 9" (1.75 m)		Boynton Beach, Florida	Team USA
41		Denisa Krížová	Senior	F	5' 5" (1.65 m)		Horni Cerekev, Czech Republic	National Sports Academy
42		Tessa Ward	Freshman	F	5' 9" (1.75 m)		Galesburg, Michigan	Lansing Spartans
66		Ainsley MacMillan (A)	Senior	D	5' 6" (1.68 m)		Ilderton, Ontario	Mississauga Jr. Chiefs

== 2017-18 Schedule ==
Date	Opponent^{#}	Rank^{#}	Site	Decision	Result	Record
Regular Season
September 29	#1 Clarkson*	#8	Matthews Arena • Boston, MA	Brittany Bugalski	T 1-1 ^{OT}	0–0–1
September 30	#1 Clarkson*	#8	Matthews Arena • Boston, MA	Brittany Bugalski	L 1-5	0–1–1
October 6	at Boston University	#8	Walter Brown Arena • Boston, MA	Brittany Bugalski	W 3-2 ^{OT}	1–1–1 (1–0–0)
October 7	Boston University	#8	Matthews Arena • Boston, MA	Brittany Bugalski	W 6-3	2–1–1 (2–0–0)
October 14	at Colgate*		Class of 1965 Arena • Hamilton, NY			
October 15	at Colgate*		Class of 1965 Arena • Hamilton, NY			
October 20	at Syracuse*		Tennity Ice Skating Pavilion • Syracuse, NY			
October 21	at Syracuse*		Tennity Ice Skating Pavilion • Syracuse, NY			
October 25	New Hampshire		Matthews Arena • Boston, MA			
October 28	at Providence		Schneider Arena • Providence, RI			
October 29	Providence		Matthews Arena • Boston, MA			
November 7	at Maine		Alfond Arena • Orono, ME			
November 11	at Merrimack		Volpe Complex • North Andover, MA			
November 12	Merrimack		Matthews Arena • Boston, MA			
November 18	Maine		Matthews Arena • Boston, MA			
November 19	Maine		Matthews Arena • Boston, MA			
November 24	vs. Wisconsin*		Kettler Capitals Iceplex • Arlington, VA (D1 in DC)			
November 25	vs. Minnesota State*		Kettler Capitals Iceplex • Arlington, VA (D1 in DC)			
November 28	at Boston College		Kelley Rink • Chestnut Hill, MA			
December 1	at New Hampshire		Whittemore Center • Durham, NH			
December 3	New Hampshire		Matthews Arena • Boston, MA			
January 9, 2018	Connecticut		Matthews Arena • Boston, MA			
January 12	at Boston College		Kelley Rink • Chestnut Hill, MA			
January 13	Boston College		Matthews Arena • Boston, MA			
January 16	Boston University		Matthews Arena • Boston, MA			
January 19	Connecticut		Matthews Arena • Boston, MA			
January 26	at [[{{{school}}}|Vermont]]		Gutterson Fieldhouse • Burlington, VT			
January 27	at Vermont		Gutterson Fieldhouse • Burlington, VT			
February 2	at Connecticut		Freitas Ice Forum • Storrs, CT			
February 6	at Boston College*		Kelley Rink • Chestnut Hill, MA (Beanpot, Opening Round)			
February 10	at Merrimack		Volpe Complex • North Andover, MA			
February 13	vs. TBD*		Kelley Rink • Chestnut Hill, MA (Beanpot)			
February 16	Vermont		Matthews Arena • Boston, MA			
February 18	at Providence		Schneider Arena • Providence, RI			
WHEA Tournament
February 23	TBD*		TBD • TBD (Quarterfinals, Game 1)			
February 24	TBD*		TBD • TBD (Quarterfinals, Game 2)			
*Non-conference game. ^{#}Rankings from USCHO.com Poll.
