= 2017–18 Providence Friars women's ice hockey season =

- Conference: WHEA
- Home ice: Schneider Arena

Record
- Overall: 3-1-0
- Home: 2-0-0
- Road: 1-1-0

Coaches and captains
- Head coach: Bob Deraney
- Assistant coaches: Melanie Ruzzi; Derek Alfama
- Captain(s): Madison Sansone; Kate Frieson
- Alternate captain(s): Brooke Boquist; Blair Parent

The Providence Friars represents Providence College in Women's Hockey East Association play during the 2017–18 NCAA Division I women's ice hockey season.

== Offseason ==
- September 24: Christina Putigna was selected to Hockey Canada’s National Women’s Program Strength And Conditioning Camp.

== Standings ==
2017–18 WHEA standings
	Conference							Overall					
	GP	W	L	T	PTS	GF	GA	GP	W	L	T	GF	GA
#5 Boston College	24	19	2	3	41	98	46	38	30	5	3	155	76
Providence	24	12	7	5	29	67	55	37	17	13	7	96	80
Maine	24	11	9	4	26	54	52	38	19	14	5	91	83
#8 Northeastern	24	11	11	2	24	69	64	39	19	17	3	107	100
New Hampshire	24	9	10	5	23	45	57	36	14	15	7	79	85
Boston University	24	8	11	5	21	72	66	37	14	17	6	113	100
Connecticut	24	7	11	6	20	47	56	39	16	14	9	88	76
Vermont	24	7	13	4	18	46	67	35	10	20	5	67	99
Merrimack	24	6	16	2	14	41	76	34	11	20	3	62	96
Championship: † indicates conference regular season champion; * indicates conference tournament champion Rankings: USCHO.com

== Roster ==
=== 2017–18 Friars ===
No.	Nat.	Player	Class	Pos	Height	DoB	Hometown	Previous team
1		Madison Myers	Junior	G	5' 7" (1.7 m)		Colchester, Vermont	Rice Memorial HS
4		Blair Parent	Senior	F	5' 5" (1.65 m)		Blaine, Minnesota	Anoka HS
5		Giana Savastano	Freshman	D	5' 6" (1.68 m)		Mapleville, Rhode Island	Winchendon School
6		Kate Friesen	Junior	D	5' 6" (1.68 m)		Altona, Manitoba	Pembina Valley Hawks
7		Whitney Dove	Sophomore	D	5' 6" (1.68 m)		Port Moody, British Columbia	Pacific Steelers
8		Kathleen McHugh	Sophomore	F	5' 4" (1.63 m)		Billerica, Massachusetts	Boston Shamrocks
9		Meaghan Rickard	Sophomore	F	5' 6" (1.68 m)		Coventry, Rhode Island	Williston-Northampton
10		Neve Van Pelt	Sophomore	F	5' 6" (1.68 m)		Mitchell, Ontario	Toronto Jr. Aeros
11		Rachel Rockwell	Sophomore	D	5' 10" (1.78 m)		Broadview Heights, Ohio	Williston-Northampton
12		Chloe Gonsalves	Freshman	D	5' 4" (1.63 m)		Toronto, Ontario	Toronto Leaside
13		Emily Landry	Junior	F	5' 8" (1.73 m)		Orangeville, Ontario	Etobicoke Jr. Dolphins
15		Maureen Murphy	Freshman	F	5' 4" (1.63 m)		Buffalo, New York	Shattuck St. Mary's
17		Cassidy MacPherson	Junior	F	5' 6" (1.68 m)		Oakville, Ontario	Oakville Jr. Hornets
18		Ariane Julien	Freshman	D	5' 8" (1.73 m)		Saint-Hyacinthe, Quebec	Stanstead College
19		Brooke Boquist	Senior	F	5' 4" (1.63 m)		Thunder Bay, Ontario	Shattuck-St. Mary's
21		Christina Putigna	Junior	F	5' 8" (1.73 m)		Grimsby, Ontario	Oakville Jr. Hornets
22		Camryn Tait	Freshman	F	5' 8" (1.73 m)		Toronto, Ontario	Toronto Jr. Aeros
23		Madison Sansone	Senior	F	5' 3" (1.6 m)		Lockport, New York	Buffalo Bisons
24		Hayley Lunny	Freshman	F	5' 4" (1.63 m)		Bedford, New York	North American Hockey Academy
26		Danielle Hardy	Junior	F	6' 0" (1.83 m)		Nanaimo, British Columbia	Pursuit of Excellence Academy
27		Avery Fransoo	Sophomore	D	5' 6" (1.68 m)		North Battleford, Saskatchewan	Notres Dame Hounds
28		Natasia Burzynski	Junior	F	5' 4" (1.63 m)		Rye, New Hampshire	East Coast Wizards
30		Sandra Abstreiter	Freshman	G	5' 11" (1.8 m)		Freising, Germany	HTI Stars
31		Clare Minnerath	Sophomore	G	5' 5" (1.65 m)		Sartell, Minnesota	Sartell HS
33		Alanna Serviss	Senior	G	5' 7" (1.7 m)		Chicago, Illinois	Chicago Young Americans

== Schedule ==
Date	Opponent^{#}	Rank^{#}	Site	Decision	Result	Record
Regular Season
September 29	at Union*		Achilles Center • Schenectady, NY	Madison Myers	W 7-3	1–0–0
October 1	Vermont		Schneider Arena • Providence, RI	Madison Myers	W 6-2	2–0–0 (1–0–0)
October 6	Quinnipiac*		Schneider Arena • Providence, RI	Madison Myers	W 3-1	3–0–0
October 7	at Quinnipiac*		High Point Solutions Arena • Hamden, CT	Madison Myers	L 0-1	3–1–0
October 13	at Syracuse*		Tennity Ice Skating Pavilion • Syracuse, NY			
October 14	at Syracuse*		Tennity Ice Skating Pavilion • Syracuse, NY			
October 20	at Princeton*		Hobey Baker Memorial Rink • Princeton, NJ			
October 21	at Princeton*		Hobey Baker Memorial Rink • Princeton, NJ			
October 28	Northeastern		Schneider Arena • Providence, RI			
October 29	at Northeastern		Matthews Arena • Boston, MA			
November 3	at Boston College		Kelley Rink • Chestnut Hill, MA			
November 10	at Maine		Alfond Arena • Orono, ME			
November 17	at Merrimack		Volpe Complex • North Andover, MA			
November 18	Merrimack		Schneider Arena • Providence, RI			
November 22	New Hampshire		Schneider Arena • Providence, RI			
November 25	Cornell*		Schneider Arena • Providence, RI			
November 26	Cornell*		Schneider Arena • Providence, RI			
December 1	at Connecticut		Freitas Ice Forum • Storrs, CT			
December 2	Connecticut		Schneider Arena • Providence, RI			
December 9	Boston University		Schneider Arena • Providence, RI			
January 2, 2018	Brown*		Schneider Arena • Providence, RI (Mayor's Cup)			
January 6	at Vermont		Gutterson Fieldhouse • Burlington, VT			
January 7	at Vermont		Gutterson Fieldhouse • Burlington, VT			
January 12	at Boston University		Walter Brown Arena • Boston, MA			
January 13	Boston University		Schneider Arena • Providence, RI			
January 19	at New Hampshire		Whittemore Center • Durham, NH			
January 20	at New Hampshire		Whittemore Center • Durham, NH			
January 26	at Boston College		Kelley Rink • Chestnut Hill, MA			
January 27	Boston College		Schneider Arena • Providence, RI			
February 2	Merrimack		Schneider Arena • Providence, RI			
February 3	at Connecticut		Freitas Ice Forum • Storrs, CT			
February 10	Maine		Schneider Arena • Providence, RI			
February 11	Maine		Schneider Arena • Providence, RI			
February 18	Northeastern		Schneider Arena • Providence, RI			
*Non-conference game. ^{#}Rankings from USCHO.com Poll.
