= 2017–18 Vermont Catamounts women's ice hockey season =

- Conference: WHEA
- Home ice: Gutterson Fieldhouse

Record
- Overall: 1–1–0
- Home: 0–0–0
- Road: 1–1–0

Coaches and captains
- Head coach: Jim Plumer
- Assistant coaches: Jess Koizumi; Josh Liegl
- Captain: Taylor Willard

The Vermont Catamounts represent the University of Vermont in Women's Hockey East Association play during the 2017–18 NCAA Division I women's ice hockey season.

== Offseason ==
- April 5: Amanda Pelkey ('15) has been chosen to Team USA for 2017-18, in preparation for the 2018 Olympics in Korea.

=== Recruiting ===
| Player | Position | Nationality | Notes |
|---|---|---|---|
| Valerie Caldwell | Forward | United States | Played for Chicago Mission |
| Greta Close | Defense | United States | Attended Kimball Union Academy |
| Anna Erickson | Forward/defense | United States | Played with Madison Capitols |
| Taylor Flaherty | Defense | United States | Transfer from North Dakota |
| Alyssa Holmes | Forward | Canada | Played for Stoney Creek Jr. Sabres |
| Olivia Kilberg | Forward | United States | Attended Edina (MN) High School |
| Sierra Natzke | Goaltender | United States | Played U-19 Michigan Spartans |
| Kristina Shanahan | Forward | Canada | Attended Dawson College in Canada |

== Standings ==
2017–18 WHEA standings
| | Conference | | | | | | | Overall | | | | | |
| | GP | W | L | T | PTS | GF | GA | GP | W | L | T | GF | GA |
|---|---|---|---|---|---|---|---|---|---|---|---|---|---|
| #5 Boston College | 24 | 19 | 2 | 3 | 41 | 98 | 46 | 38 | 30 | 5 | 3 | 155 | 76 |
| Providence | 24 | 12 | 7 | 5 | 29 | 67 | 55 | 37 | 17 | 13 | 7 | 96 | 80 |
| Maine | 24 | 11 | 9 | 4 | 26 | 54 | 52 | 38 | 19 | 14 | 5 | 91 | 83 |
| #8 Northeastern | 24 | 11 | 11 | 2 | 24 | 69 | 64 | 39 | 19 | 17 | 3 | 107 | 100 |
| New Hampshire | 24 | 9 | 10 | 5 | 23 | 45 | 57 | 36 | 14 | 15 | 7 | 79 | 85 |
| Boston University | 24 | 8 | 11 | 5 | 21 | 72 | 66 | 37 | 14 | 17 | 6 | 113 | 100 |
| Connecticut | 24 | 7 | 11 | 6 | 20 | 47 | 56 | 39 | 16 | 14 | 9 | 88 | 76 |
| Vermont | 24 | 7 | 13 | 4 | 18 | 46 | 67 | 35 | 10 | 20 | 5 | 67 | 99 |
| Merrimack | 24 | 6 | 16 | 2 | 14 | 41 | 76 | 34 | 11 | 20 | 3 | 62 | 96 |
Championship: † indicates conference regular season champion; * indicates conference tournament champion Rankings: USCHO.com

== Roster ==
=== 2017–18 Catamounts ===
| No. | Nat. | Player | Class | Pos | Height | DoB | Hometown | Previous team |
|---|---|---|---|---|---|---|---|---|
| 1 | | Sierra Natzke | Freshman | G | 5' 6" (1.68 m) | | Pine, Colorado | Lansing Spartans |
| 2 | | Kourtney Menches | Senior | F | 5' 2" (1.57 m) | | Greer, South Carolina | Shattuck-St. Mary's |
| 4 | | Sammy Kolowrat | Junior | F | 5' 7" (1.7 m) | | Prague, Czech Republic | Czech National Team |
| 7 | | Kristina Shanahan | Freshman | F | 5' 4" (1.63 m) | | Sainte-Anne-de-Bellevue, Quebec | Dawson College |
| 9 | | Olivia Kilberg | Freshman | F | 5' 4" (1.63 m) | | Edina, Minnesota | Edina HS |
| 10 | | Mackenzie MacNeil | Senior | F | 5' 8" (1.73 m) | | Richmond Hill, Ontario | Toronto Aeros |
| 11 | | Katherine Pate | Senior | D | 5' 2" (1.57 m) | | Saco, Maine | Assabet Valley |
| 12 | | Amanda Drobot | Senior | D | 5' 6" (1.68 m) | | Churchville, Pennsylvania | New Jersey Colonials |
| 14 | | Ali O'Leary | Sophomore | F | 5' 4" (1.63 m) | | Reading, Massachusetts | Boston Shamrocks |
| 16 | | Greta Close | Freshman | D | 5' 7" (1.7 m) | | Norwich, Vermont | Kimball Union |
| 19 | | Valerie Caldwell | Freshman | F | 5' 6" (1.68 m) | | Glenview, Illinois | Chicago Mission |
| 21 | | Allie Granato | Sophomore | F | 5' 3" (1.6 m) | | Plainfield, Illinois | Chicago Fury |
| 23 | | Alyssa Gorecki | Junior | F | 5' 4" (1.63 m) | | Monee, Illinois | US National Team U18 |
| 24 | | Saana Valkama | Junior | F | 5' 6" (1.68 m) | | Pirkkala, Finland | Finland National Team |
| 25 | | Alyssa Holmes | Freshman | F | 5' 4" (1.63 m) | | Burlington, Ontario | Stoney Creek Jr. Sabres |
| 26 | | Eve-Audrey Pickard | Sophomore | F | 5' 6" (1.68 m) | | Longueuil, Quebec | Team Canada U-18 |
| 27 | | Taylor Willard (C) | Senior | D | 5' 6" (1.68 m) | | Naperville, Illinois | US National Team U18 |
| 29 | | Taylor Flaherty | Junior | D | 5' 9" (1.75 m) | | Lakeville, Minnesota | University of North Dakota |
| 33 | | Melissa Black | Junior | G | 5' 5" (1.65 m) | | Newmarket, Ontario | Union (NCAA) |
| 37 | | Sydney Scobee | Sophomore | G | 6' 0" (1.83 m) | | Minnetrista, Minnesota | Breck School |
| 44 | | Anna Erickson | Freshman | F | 5' 4" (1.63 m) | | Stillwater, Minnesota | Madison Capitols |
| 77 | | Daria O'Neill | Junior | D | 5' 9" (1.75 m) | | Cochrane, Alberta | Edge School |

== Schedule ==
| Date | Opponent^{#} | Rank^{#} | Site | Decision | Result | Record |
Regular Season
| October 1 | at Providence | | Schneider Arena • Providence, RI | Melissa Black | L 2-6 | 0–1–0 (0–1–0) |
| October 7 | at Connecticut | | Freitas Ice Forum • Storrs, CT | Sydney Scobee | W 2-1 | 1–1–0 (1–1–0) |
| October 10 | Union* | | Gutterson Fieldhouse • Burlington, VT | | | |
| October 13 | at Quinnipiac* | | High Point Solutions Arena • Hamden, CT | | | |
| October 14 | at Quinnipiac* | | High Point Solutions Arena • Hamden, CT | | | |
| October 20 | New Hampshire | | Gutterson Fieldhouse • Burlington, VT | | | |
| October 22 | Boston College | | Gutterson Fieldhouse • Burlington, VT | | | |
| October 27 | at Merrimack | | Volpe Complex • North Andover, MA | | | |
| October 28 | at Merrimack | | Volpe Complex • North Andover, MA | | | |
| November 3 | at New Hampshire | | Whittemore Center • Durham, NH | | | |
| November 4 | at New Hampshire | | Whittemore Center • Durham, NH | | | |
| November 10 | Clarkson* | | Gutterson Fieldhouse • Burlington, VT | | | |
| November 11 | at Clarkson* | | Cheel Arena • Potsdam, New York | | | |
| November 17 | Boston University | | Gutterson Fieldhouse • Burlington, VT | | | |
| November 18 | Boston University | | Gutterson Fieldhouse • Burlington, VT | | | |
| November 24 | RIT* | | Gutterson Fieldhouse • Burlington, VT (Windjammer Classic, Opening Game) | | | |
| November 25 | TBD* | | Gutterson Fieldhouse • Burlington, VT (Windjammer Classic) | | | |
| December 2 | at Maine | | Alfond Arena • Orono, ME | | | |
| December 3 | at Maine | | Alfond Arena • Orono, ME | | | |
| December 9 | Maine | | Gutterson Fieldhouse • Burlington, VT | | | |
| January 6, 2018 | Providence | | Gutterson Fieldhouse • Burlington, VT | | | |
| January 7 | Providence | | Gutterson Fieldhouse • Burlington, VT | | | |
| January 12 | at Minnesota* | | Ridder Arena • Minneapolis, MN | | | |
| January 13 | at Minnesota* | | Ridder Arena • Minneapolis, MN | | | |
| January 19 | at Boston College | | Kelley Rink • Chestnut Hill, MA | | | |
| January 20 | at Boston College | | Kelley Rink • Chestnut Hill, MA | | | |
| January 26 | Northeastern | | Gutterson Fieldhouse • Burlington, VT | | | |
| January 27 | Northeastern | | Gutterson Fieldhouse • Burlington, VT | | | |
| February 2 | at Boston University | | Walter Brown Arena • Boston, MA | | | |
| February 4 | Merrimack | | Gutterson Fieldhouse • Burlington, VT | | | |
| February 9 | Connecticut | | Gutterson Fieldhouse • Burlington, VT | | | |
| February 10 | Connecticut | | Gutterson Fieldhouse • Burlington, VT | | | |
| February 16 | at Northeastern | | Matthews Arena • Boston, MA | | | |
WHEA Tournament
| February 23 | TBD* | | TBD • (Quarterfinals, Game 2) | | | |
| February 24 | TBD* | | TBD • (Quarterfinals, Game 2) | | | |
*Non-conference game. ^{#}Rankings from USCHO.com Poll.
