= 2017–18 New Hampshire Wildcats women's ice hockey season =

- Conference: WHEA
- Home ice: Whittemore Center

Record
- Overall: 0-0-0
- Home: 0-0-0
- Road: 0-0-0

Coaches and captains
- Head coach: Hilary Witt
- Assistant coaches: Stephanie Jones; Bill Bowes

The New Hampshire Wildcats represent the University of New Hampshire in Women's Hockey East Association play during the 2017–18 NCAA Division I women's ice hockey season.

== Standings ==
2017–18 WHEA standings
	Conference							Overall					
	GP	W	L	T	PTS	GF	GA	GP	W	L	T	GF	GA
#5 Boston College	24	19	2	3	41	98	46	38	30	5	3	155	76
Providence	24	12	7	5	29	67	55	37	17	13	7	96	80
Maine	24	11	9	4	26	54	52	38	19	14	5	91	83
#8 Northeastern	24	11	11	2	24	69	64	39	19	17	3	107	100
New Hampshire	24	9	10	5	23	45	57	36	14	15	7	79	85
Boston University	24	8	11	5	21	72	66	37	14	17	6	113	100
Connecticut	24	7	11	6	20	47	56	39	16	14	9	88	76
Vermont	24	7	13	4	18	46	67	35	10	20	5	67	99
Merrimack	24	6	16	2	14	41	76	34	11	20	3	62	96
Championship: † indicates conference regular season champion; * indicates conference tournament champion Rankings: USCHO.com

== 2017–18 schedule ==
Date	Opponent^{#}	Rank^{#}	Site	Decision	Result	Record
October 6	Merrimack		Whittemore Center • Durham, NH		0–0–0	
October 7	at Merrimack		Volpe Complex • North Andover, MA			
October 14	Holy Cross*		Whittemore Center • Durham, NH			
October 20	at Vermont		Gutterson Fieldhouse • Burlington, VT			
October 22	Dartmouth*		Whittemore Center • Durham, NH			
October 25	at Northeastern		Matthews Arena • Boston, MA			
October 28	Maine		Whittemore Center • Durham, NH			
October 29	Boston University		Whittemore Center • Durham, NH			
November 3	Vermont		Whittemore Center • Durham, NH			
November 4	Vermont		Whittemore Center • Durham, NH			
November 10	Colgate*		Whittemore Center • Durham, NH			
November 11	Colgate*		Whittemore Center • Durham, NH			
November 18	at Rensselaer*		Houston Field House • Troy, NY			
November 19	at Rensselaer*		Houston Field House • Troy, NY			
November 22	at Providence		Schneider Arena • Providence, RI			
November 25	at Harvard*		Bright-Landry Hockey Center • Allston, MA			
December 1	Northeastern		Whittemore Center • Durham, NH			
December 3	at Northeastern		Whittemore Center • Durham, NH			
December 8	at Connecticut		Freitas Ice Forum • Storrs, CT			
December 10	Yale*		Whittemore Center • Durham, NH			
January 6, 2018	at Boston College		Kelley Rink • Chestnut Hill, MA			
January 7	Boston College		Whittemore Center • Durham, NH			
January 10	at Merrimack		Volpe Complex • North Andover, MA			
January 13	Connecticut		Whittemore Center • Durham, NH			
January 14	Connecticut		Whittemore Center • Durham, NH			
January 19	Providence		Whittemore Center • Durham, NH			
January 20	Providence		Whittemore Center • Durham, NH			
January 26	at Quinnipiac*		High Point Solutions Arena • Hamden, CT			
January 27	at Quinnipiac*		High Point Solutions Arena • Hamden, CT			
February 2	at Maine		Alfond Arena • Orono, ME			
February 3	at Maine		Alfond Arena • Orono, ME			
February 10	at Boston College		Kelley Rink • Chestnut Hill, MA			
February 17	Boston University		Whittemore Center • Durham, NH			
February 18	at Boston University		Walter Brown Arena • Boston, MA			
WHEA Tournament
February 23	TBD*		TBD • (Quarterfinal, Game 1)			
February 24	TBD*		TBD • (Quarterfinal, Game 2)			
*Non-conference game. ^{#}Rankings from USCHO.com Poll.
