= 2017–18 Maine Black Bears women's ice hockey season =

- Conference: WHEA
- Home ice: Alfond Arena

Record
- Overall: 19–14–5
- Home: 10–6–3
- Road: 9–8–2

Coaches and captains
- Head coach: Richard Reichenbach
- Assistant coaches: Sara Reichenbach; Emily Bruns; Trey Flesch
- Captain: Alyson Matteau
- Alternate captain(s): Brooke Stacey; Cailey Hutchison

The Maine Black Bears represent the University of Maine in Women's Hockey East Association during the 2017–18 NCAA Division I women's ice hockey season.

== Offseason ==
- June 22: Tereza Vanišová was named the Czech Republic's women's player of the year. She scored 5 goals in the 2017 IIHF World Championships in Plymouth, Michigan

== Standings ==
2017–18 WHEA standings
	Conference							Overall					
	GP	W	L	T	PTS	GF	GA	GP	W	L	T	GF	GA
#5 Boston College	24	19	2	3	41	98	46	38	30	5	3	155	76
Providence	24	12	7	5	29	67	55	37	17	13	7	96	80
Maine	24	11	9	4	26	54	52	38	19	14	5	91	83
#8 Northeastern	24	11	11	2	24	69	64	39	19	17	3	107	100
New Hampshire	24	9	10	5	23	45	57	36	14	15	7	79	85
Boston University	24	8	11	5	21	72	66	37	14	17	6	113	100
Connecticut	24	7	11	6	20	47	56	39	16	14	9	88	76
Vermont	24	7	13	4	18	46	67	35	10	20	5	67	99
Merrimack	24	6	16	2	14	41	76	34	11	20	3	62	96
Championship: † indicates conference regular season champion; * indicates conference tournament champion Rankings: USCHO.com

== Roster ==
=== 2017–18 Black Bears ===
se

No.	Nat.	Player	Class	Pos	Height	DoB	Hometown	Previous team
1		Jillian Flynn	Sophomore	G	5' 5" (1.65 m)		Presque Isle, Maine	Presque Isle HS
2		Taylor Leech	Freshman	D			Bowdoinham, Maine	Assabet Valley
3		Brooke Stacey (A)	Senior	F	5' 10" (1.78 m)		Kahnawake, Quebec	Ontario Hockey Academy
7		Ebba Strandberg	Sophomore	D	6' 1" (1.85 m)		Kalmar, Sweden	Team Sweden U18
7		Alyson Matteau (C)	Junior	D	5' 10" (1.78 m)		Mirabel, Quebec	Northwood School
8		Brittany Kucera	Sophomore	D	5' 10" (1.78 m)		Toronto, Ontario	Aurora Jr. Panthers
9		Mikayla Rogers	Senior	D	5' 7" (1.7 m)		St. Paul, Minnesota	St. Paul Blades
10		Jessica Jacques	Sophomore	F	5' 4" (1.63 m)		North Reading, Massachusetts	Boston Shamrocks
11		Victoria Hummel	Senior	F	5' 3" (1.6 m)		Tulln, Austria	EHV Sabers
13		Cailey Hutchison (A)	Junior	F	5' 4" (1.63 m)		Hicksville, New York	Northwood School
14		Maddie Giordano	Freshman	F	5' 5" (1.65 m)		Granby, Connecticut	Loomis Chaffee
15		Catherine Tufts	Senior	F	5' 6" (1.68 m)		Church Point, Nova Scotia	Ontario Hockey Academy
16		Brittany Colton	Sophomore	D	5' 6" (1.68 m)		Groton, Massachusetts	East Coast Wizards
17		Lydia Murray	Sophomore	F	5' 10" (1.78 m)		Sault Ste. Marie, Ontario	Sault Ste. Marie Wildcats
19		Michelle Weis	Freshman	F			Charlottenlund, Denmark	Luleå HF
21		Tereza Vanišová	Sophomore	F	5' 8" (1.73 m)		Strakonice, Czech Republic	Czech National Team
23		Josefine Engmann	Freshman	F			Oslo, Norway	Vålerenga
24		Maggie Blair	Freshman	D			Cornwall, Ontario	Ontario Hockey Academy
25		Daria Tereshkina	Freshman	F			Chelyabinsk, Russia	Hockey Training Institute
26		Sierra Semmel	Sophomore	F	5' 3" (1.6 m)		Dedham, Maine	Washington Pride
27		Anna Zíková	Freshman				Ceský Tešín, Czech Republic	Gymnasium Josefa Bozka
28		Vendula Pribylová	Sophomore	F	5' 7" (1.7 m)		Olomouc, Czech Republic	Czech National Team
29		Kristin Gilmore	Senior	D	5' 10" (1.78 m)		Millgrove, Ontario	Oakville Hornets
31		Carly Jackson	Sophomore	G	5' 5" (1.65 m)		Amherst, Nova Scotia	Cumberland County Blues Jr. B
41		Loryn Porter	Freshman	G			North Bay, Ontario	Mississauga Jr. Chiefs

== 2017–18 schedule ==
Date	Opponent^{#}	Rank^{#}	Site	Decision	Result	Record
Regular season
September 29	#9 Quinnipiac*		Alfond Arena • Orono, ME	Carly Jackson	L 1–2	0–1–0
September 30	#9 Quinnipiac*		Alfond Arena • Orono, ME	Carly Jackson	W 4–2	1–1–0
October 6	at Rensselaer*		Houston Field House • Troy, NY	Carly Jackson	W 2–1	2–1–0
October 7	at Rensselaer*		Houston Field House • Troy, NY	Carly Jackson	W 3–2	3–1–0
October 13	#10 Robert Morris*		Alfond Arena • Orono, ME	Carly Jackson	L 1–2	3–2–0
October 14	#10 Robert Morris*		Alfond Arena • Orono, ME	Loryn Porter	W 5–2	4–2–0
October 20	Boston University		Alfond Arena • Orono, ME	Carly Jackson	W 4–2	5–2–0 (1–0–0)
October 28	at New Hampshire		Whittemore Center • Durham, NH	Carly Jackson	L 1–2	5–3–0 (1–1–0)
October 29	at #3 Boston College		Kelley Rink • Chestnut Hill, MA	Loryn Porter	L 2–7	5–4–0 (1–2–0)
November 4	at Dartmouth*		Thompson Arena • Hanover, NH	Carly Jackson	L 0–3	5–5–0
November 5	at Dartmouth*		Thompson Arena • Hanover, NH	Loryn Porter	W 7–2	6–5–0
November 7	Northeastern		Alfond Arena • Orono, ME	Carly Jackson	W 4–2	7–5–0 (2–2–0)
November 10	Providence		Alfond Arena • Orono, ME	Carly Jackson	T 2–2 ^{OT}	7–5–1 (2–2–1)
November 12	Connecticut		Alfond Arena • Orono, ME	Carly Jackson	W 4–3 ^{OT}	8–5–1 (3–2–1)
November 18	at Northeastern		Matthews Arena • Boston, MA	Carly Jackson	L 0–3	8–6–1 (3–3–1)
November 19	at Northeastern		Matthews Arena • Boston, MA	Carly Jackson	W 2–0	9–6–1 (4–3–1)
November 24	at Union*		Achilles Center • Schenectady, NY	Carly Jackson	T 3–3 ^{OT}	9–6–2
November 25	at Union*		Achilles Center • Schenectady, NY	Carly Jackson	W 2–1	10–6–2
December 2	Vermont		Alfond Arena • Orono, ME	Carly Jackson	W 2–0	11–6–2 (5–3–1)
December 3	Vermont		Alfond Arena • Orono, ME	Carly Jackson	T 2–2 ^{OT}	11–6–3 (5–3–2)
December 9	at Vermont		Gutterson Fieldhouse • Burlington, VT	Carly Jackson	W 4–1	12–6–3 (6–3–2)
January 6, 2018	at Boston University		Walter Brown Arena • Boston, MA	Carly Jackson	W 4–1	13–6–3 (7–3–2)
January 7	at Boston University		Walter Brown Arena • Boston, MA	Carly Jackson	W 3–2	14–6–3 (8–3–2)
January 13	at Merrimack	#9	Volpe Complex • North Andover, MA	Carly Jackson	W 5–1	15–6–3 (9–3–2)
January 19	Merrimack	#9	Alfond Arena • Orono, ME	Carly Jackson	W 4–1	16–6–3 (10–3–2)
January 20	Merrimack	#9	Alfond Arena • Orono, ME	Carly Jackson	L 2–4	16–7–3 (10–4–2)
January 26	at Connecticut		Freitas Ice Forum • Storrs, CT	Carly Jackson	L 1–2 ^{OT}	16–8–3 (10–5–2)
January 27	at Connecticut		Freitas Ice Forum • Storrs, CT	Carly Jackson	L 0–4	16–9–3 (10–6–2)
February 2	New Hampshire		Alfond Arena • Orono, ME	Carly Jackson	T 2–2 ^{OT}	16–9–4 (10–6–3)
February 3	New Hampshire		Alfond Arena • Orono, ME	Carly Jackson	W 3–0	17–9–4 (11–6–3)
February 10	at Providence	#9	Schneider Arena • Providence, RI	Carly Jackson	T 1–1 ^{OT}	17–9–5 (11–6–4)
February 11	at Providence	#9	Schneider Arena • Providence, RI	Carly Jackson	L 1–2 ^{OT}	17–10–5 (11–7–4)
February 16	Boston College		Alfond Arena • Orono, ME	Carly Jackson	L 0–5	17–11–5 (11–8–4)
February 17	Boston College		Alfond Arena • Orono, ME	Loryn Porter	L 1–3	17–12–5 (11–9–4)
WHEA Tournament
February 23	Boston University*		Alfond Arena • Orono, ME (Quarterfinals, Game 1)	Carly Jackson	W 3–2	18–12–5
February 24	Boston University*		Alfond Arena • Orono, ME (Quarterfinals, Game 2)	Carly Jackson	L 1–4	18–13–5
February 25	Boston University*		Alfond Arena • Orono, ME (Quarterfinals, Game 3)	Carly Jackson	W 4–3 ^{OT}	19–13–5
March 3	Northeastern*		Matthews Arena • Boston, MA (Semifinal Game)	Carly Jackson	L 1–2	19–14–5
*Non-conference game. ^{#}Rankings from USCHO.com Poll.
