= 2017–18 Boston University Terriers women's ice hockey season =

- Conference: WHEA
- Home ice: Walter Brown Arena

Record
- Overall: 0–3–0
- Home: 0–2–0
- Road: 0–1–0

Coaches and captains
- Head coach: Brian Durocher
- Assistant coaches: Liz Keady
- Captain: Rebecca Leslie

The Boston University Terriers represent Boston University in Women's Hockey East Association during the 2017–18 NCAA Division I women's ice hockey season.

== Offseason ==
- May 11: Alumni Marie-Philip Puolin ('15) and Jenn Wakefield ('12) are members of Canada's Centralization roster. 23 of the 28 players on this roster will be chosen to represent Canada in the 2018 Olympics.

=== Recruiting ===
Player	Position	Nationality	Notes
Rachel Allen	Forward/Defense	United States	Standout with Gilmour Academy
Jesse Compher	Forward	United States	Two-time IIHF U-18 Gold Medalist with Team USA
Nara Elia	Forward	Canada	Attended Okanagan Academy
Lauren Klein	Forward	United States	Skated for Northwood School
Reagan Rust	Defender	United States	Transfer from RIT
Corinne Schroeder	Goaltender	Canada	Silver medallist with Canada in IIHF U-18 World Championships
Kristina Schuler	Forward	United States	Attended Choate-Rosemary Hall
Abbey Stanley	Defense	United States	Transfer from North Dakota

== Standings ==
2017–18 WHEA standings
	Conference							Overall					
	GP	W	L	T	PTS	GF	GA	GP	W	L	T	GF	GA
#5 Boston College	24	19	2	3	41	98	46	38	30	5	3	155	76
Providence	24	12	7	5	29	67	55	37	17	13	7	96	80
Maine	24	11	9	4	26	54	52	38	19	14	5	91	83
#8 Northeastern	24	11	11	2	24	69	64	39	19	17	3	107	100
New Hampshire	24	9	10	5	23	45	57	36	14	15	7	79	85
Boston University	24	8	11	5	21	72	66	37	14	17	6	113	100
Connecticut	24	7	11	6	20	47	56	39	16	14	9	88	76
Vermont	24	7	13	4	18	46	67	35	10	20	5	67	99
Merrimack	24	6	16	2	14	41	76	34	11	20	3	62	96
Championship: † indicates conference regular season champion; * indicates conference tournament champion Rankings: USCHO.com

== 2017–18 Terriers ==
No.	Nat.	Player	Class	Pos	Height	DoB	Hometown	Previous team
1		Ashlyn Aiello	Senior	G	5' 0" (1.52 m)		Belmont, Massachusetts	Phillips Academy
4		Alexandra Calderone	Sophomore	D	5' 4" (1.63 m)		Kirkland, Quebec	Team Quebec
7		Jesse Compher	Freshman	F	5' 8" (1.73 m)		Northbrook, Illinois	Chicago Mission
8		Deziray De Sousa	Sophomore	F	5' 8" (1.73 m)		Montreal, Quebec	Phillips Exeter
9		Abby Cook	Sophomore	D	5' 10" (1.78 m)		Kelowna, British Columbia	Pursuit of Excellence
10		Katie Shannahan	Sophomore	D	5' 7" (1.7 m)		Colorado Springs, Colorado	Detroit Little Caesars
11		Lauren Klein	Freshman	F	5' 9" (1.75 m)		Minnetonka, Minnesota	Northwood School
12		Victoria Bach	Senior	F	5' 4" (1.63 m)		Milton, Ontario	Mississauga Jr. Chiefs
13		Natasza Tarnowski	Sophomore	F	5' 4" (1.63 m)		Embrun, Ontario	Ottawa Jr. Senators
14		Kristina Schuler	Freshman	F	5' 5" (1.65 m)		Webster, New York	Choate-Rosemary Hall
16		Sammy Davis	Junior	F	5' 4" (1.63 m)		Pembroke, Massachusetts	Tabor Academy
17		Breanna Scarpaci	Sophomore	D	5' 5" (1.65 m)		Washington, Michigan	Shattuck St. Mary's
18		Reagan Rust	Junior	D	5' 7" (1.7 m)		Southaven, Mississippi	RIT
19		Rebecca Leslie (C)	Senior	F	5' 6" (1.68 m)		Ottawa, Ontario	Ottawa Senators (PWHL)
21		Abbey Stanley	Sophomore (RS)	D	5' 8" (1.73 m)		St. Louis, Missouri	North Dakota
22		Rachel Allen	Freshman	F	5' 6" (1.68 m)		Cary, North Carolina	Gilmour Academy
23		Nina Rodgers	Senior	F	5' 5" (1.65 m)		Minnetonka, Minnesota	Minnesota
24		Mary Grace Kelley	Junior	F	5' 5" (1.65 m)		Natick, Massachusetts	Dexter Southfield
26		Connor Galway	Junior	D	5' 10" (1.78 m)		Athens, Ontario	Toronto Aeros
27		Nara Elia	Freshman	F	5' 7" (1.7 m)		Saskatoon, Saskatchewan	Okanagan Academy
28		Savannah Newton	Senior	D	5' 4" (1.63 m)		Halifax, Nova Scotia	Appleby College
30		Corinne Schroeder	Freshman	G	5' 11" (1.8 m)		Elm Creek, Manitoba	Balmoral Hall
31		Erin O'Neil	Senior	G	5' 7" (1.7 m)		Minnetonka, Minnesota	Hopkins High School

== 2017–18 Schedule ==
Date	Opponent^{#}	Rank^{#}	Site	Decision	Result	Record
Regular Season
September 23	Merrimack		Walter Brown Arena • Boston, MA	Erin O'Neill	L 1-2	0–1–0 (0–1–0)
October 6	#8 Northeastern		Walter Brown Arena • Boston, MA	Erin O'Neill	L 2-3 ^{OT}	0–2–0 (0–2–0)
October 7	at #8 Northeastern		Matthews Arena • Boston, MA	Erin O'Neill	L 3-6	0–3–0 (0–3–0)
October 20	at Maine		Alfond Arena • Orono, ME			
October 22	Connecticut		Walter Brown Arena • Boston, MA			
October 28	Boston College		Walter Brown Arena • Boston, MA			
October 29	at New Hampshire		Whittemore Center • Durham, NH			
November 3	RIT*		Walter Brown Arena • Boston, MA			
November 4	RIT*		Agganis Arena • Boston, MA			
November 10	Connecticut		Walter Brown Arena • Boston, MA			
November 17	at Vermont		Gutterson Fieldhouse • Burlington, VT			
November 18	at Vermont		Gutterson Fieldhouse • Burlington, VT			
November 24	vs. Minnesota State*		Kettler Capitals Iceplex • Arlington, VA (DI in DC)			
November 25	vs. Wisconsin*		Kettler Capitals Iceplex • Arlington, VA (DI in DC)			
November 28	Brown*		Walter Brown Arena • Boston, MA			
December 1	at Boston College		Kelley Rink • Chestnut Hill, MA			
December 2	Boston College		Walter Brown Arena • Boston, MA			
December 7	at Yale*		Ingalls Rink • New Haven, CT			
December 9	at Providence		Schneider Arena • Providence, RI			
December 30	at Princeton*		Hobey Baker Memorial Rink • Princeton, NJ			
December 31	at Princeton*		Hobey Baker Memorial Rink • Princeton, NJ			
January 6, 2018	Maine		Walter Brown Arena • Boston, MA			
January 7	Maine		Walter Brown Arena • Boston, MA			
January 12	Providence		Walter Brown Arena • Boston, MA			
January 13	at Providence		Schneider Arena • Providence, RI			
January 16	at Northeastern		Matthews Arena • Boston, MA			
January 21	at Connecticut		Freitas Ice Forum • Storrs, CT			
January 25	at Merrimack		Volpe Complex • North Andover, MA			
January 27	Merrimack		Walter Brown Arena • Boston, MA			
February 2	Vermont		Walter Brown Arena • Boston, MA			
February 6	vs. Harvard*		Kelley Rink • Chestnut Hill, MA (Beanpot, Opening Game)			
February 13	vs. TBD*		Kelley Rink • Chestnut Hill, MA (Beanpot)			
February 17	at New Hampshire		Whittemore Center • Durham, NH			
February 18	New Hampshire		Walter Brown Arena • Boston, MA			
WHEA Tournament
February 24	TBD*		TBD • TBD (Quarterfinals, Game 1)			
February 25	TBD*		TBD • TBD (Quarterfinals, Game 2)			
*Non-conference game. ^{#}Rankings from USCHO.com Poll.
