= 2017–18 UConn Huskies women's ice hockey season =

- Conference: WHEA
- Home ice: Freitas Ice Forum

Record
- Overall: 16-14-9
- Conference: 7–11–6
- Home: 10–2–7
- Road: 5–11–2

Coaches and captains
- Head coach: Chris MacKenzie
- Assistant coaches: Jaclyn Hawkins; Casey Handrahan; Carson Duggan
- Captain: Justine Fredette
- Alternate captain(s): Leah Lum; Jaime Fox

The UConn Huskies women's ice hockey program represented the University of Connecticut Huskies during the 2017–18 NCAA Division I women's ice hockey season.

== Offseason ==
=== Recruiting ===
Player	Position	Nationality	Notes

== Standings ==
2017–18 WHEA standings
	Conference							Overall					
	GP	W	L	T	PTS	GF	GA	GP	W	L	T	GF	GA
#5 Boston College	24	19	2	3	41	98	46	38	30	5	3	155	76
Providence	24	12	7	5	29	67	55	37	17	13	7	96	80
Maine	24	11	9	4	26	54	52	38	19	14	5	91	83
#8 Northeastern	24	11	11	2	24	69	64	39	19	17	3	107	100
New Hampshire	24	9	10	5	23	45	57	36	14	15	7	79	85
Boston University	24	8	11	5	21	72	66	37	14	17	6	113	100
Connecticut	24	7	11	6	20	47	56	39	16	14	9	88	76
Vermont	24	7	13	4	18	46	67	35	10	20	5	67	99
Merrimack	24	6	16	2	14	41	76	34	11	20	3	62	96
Championship: † indicates conference regular season champion; * indicates conference tournament champion Rankings: USCHO.com

== Roster ==
=== 2017–18 Huskies ===
No.	Nat.	Player	Class	Pos	Height	DoB	Hometown	Previous team
3		Theresa Knutson	Senior	F	5' 6" (1.68 m)		Onalaska, Wisconsin	Team Wisconsin
4		Cyndee Cook	Senior	D	5' 4" (1.63 m)		Winnipeg, Manitoba	Shaftesbury Prep
6		Norah Maclaine	Junior	F	5' 8" (1.73 m)		Easton, Massachusetts	Oliver Ames HS
7		Leah Lum (A)	Senior	D	5' 5" (1.65 m)		Richmond, British Columbia	Pacific Steelers
8		Rebecca Lindblad	Junior	F	5' 8" (1.73 m)		Winnetka, Illinois	New Trier HS
9		Natalie Snodgrass	Freshman	F	5' 6" (1.68 m)		Eagan, Minnesota	Team USA U18
10		Lindsay Roethke	Senior	F	5' 1" (1.55 m)		Buffalo, Minnesota	Buffalo HS
13		Reese Maccario	Senior	F	5' 3" (1.6 m)		Marblehead, Massachusetts	Boston Shamrocks
14		Justine Fredette (C)	Senior	F	5' 5" (1.65 m)		Winnipeg, Manitoba	Shaftesbury Prep
16		Taylor Wabick	Freshman	D	5' 4" (1.63 m)		Winnipeg, Manitoba	Balmoral Hall
17		Savannah Bouzide	Freshman	F	5' 5" (1.65 m)		Amherstburg, Ontario	Team Ontario Blue U18
18		Shavonne Leacy	Freshman	D	5' 11" (1.8 m)		Hillsborough, New Jersey	Minnesota Revolution U19
19		Leona Sim	Sophomore	F	5' 4" (1.63 m)		Vancouver, British Columbia	Pacific Steelers
21		Erica D'Ericco	Sophomore	F	5' 6" (1.68 m)		Concord, New Hampshire	Northern Cyclones
24		Morgan Fisher	Sophomore	G	5' 7" (1.7 m)		Vernon, Connecticut	Mid-Fairfield Stars
27		Morgan Wabick	Freshman	F	5' 3" (1.6 m)		Winnipeg, Manitoba	Balmoral Hall
28		Kayla Mee	Junior	D	5' 11" (1.8 m)		Winnipeg, Manitoba	Shaftesbury Prep
31		Stephanie Maiolo	Sophomore	G	5' 3" (1.6 m)		Enfield, Connecticut	New England Jr. Falcons
41		Annie Belanger	Senior	G	5' 9" (1.75 m)		Sherbrooke, Quebec	Team Quebec U18
44		Tristyn Svetek	Freshman	D	5' 6" (1.68 m)		Burlington, Ontario	Nepean Jr. Wildcats
47		Jaime Fox (A)	Junior	D	5' 10" (1.78 m)		Unionville, Ontario	Unionville HS
61		Briana Colangelo	Sophomore	F	5' 8" (1.73 m)		Whitby, Ontario	Whitby Jr. Wolves
71		Carley Olivier	Freshman	D	5' 5" (1.65 m)		Sudbury, Ontario	Kitchener-Waterloo Rangers
74		Emily Reid	Sophomore	D	5' 8" (1.73 m)		Whitby, Ontario	Whitby Jr. Wolves
91		Madison Badeau	Senior	F	6' 0" (1.83 m)		Courtice, Ontario	Jr. Wolves Intermediate
97		Catherine Crawley	Sophomore	F	5' 3" (1.6 m)		Washingtonville, New York	Mid-Fairfield Stars

== Schedule ==
Date	Opponent^{#}	Rank^{#}	Site	Decision	Result	Record
Regular Season
September 29	at St. Cloud State*		Herb Brooks National Hockey Center • St. Cloud, MN	Annie Belanger	W 1-0 ^{OT}	1–0–0
September 30	at St. Cloud State*		Herb Brooks National Hockey Center • St. Cloud, MN	Morgan Fisher	L 2-3	1–1–0
October 7	Vermont		Freitas Ice Forum • Storrs, CT			
October 13	Union*		Freitas Ice Forum • Storrs, CT			
October 14	Union*		Freitas Ice Forum • Storrs, CT			
October 20	Boston College		Freitas Ice Forum • Storrs, CT			
October 22	at Boston University		Walter Brown Arena • Boston, MA			
November 3	Rensselaer*		Freitas Ice Forum • Storrs, CT			
November 4	Rensselaer*		Freitas Ice Forum • Storrs, CT			
November 10	at Boston University		Walter Brown Arena • Boston, MA			
November 12	at Maine		Alfond Arena • Orono, ME			
November 17	at Boston College		Kelley Rink • Chestnut Hill, MA			
November 18	Boston College		Freitas Ice Forum • Storrs, CT			
November 24	Penn State*		Freitas Ice Forum • Storrs, CT (Nutmeg Classic, Opening Round)			
November 25	TBD*		Freitas Ice Forum • Storrs, CT (Nutmeg Classic)			
December 1	Providence		Freitas Ice Forum • Storrs, CT			
December 2	at Providence		Schneider Arena • Providence, RI			
December 8	New Hampshire		Freitas Ice Forum • Storrs, CT			
December 31	at Dartmouth*		Thompson Arena • Hanover, NH			
January 5, 2018	at Merrimack		Volpe Complex • North Andover, MA			
January 6	Brown*		Freitas Ice Forum • Storrs, CT			
January 9	at Northeastern		Matthews Arena • Boston, MA			
January 13	at New Hampshire		Whittemore Center • Durham, NH			
January 14	at New Hampshire		Whittemore Center • Durham, NH			
January 19	at Northeastern		Matthews Arena • Boston, MA			
January 21	Boston University		Freitas Ice Forum • Storrs, CT			
January 26	Maine		Freitas Ice Forum • Storrs, CT			
January 27	Maine		Freitas Ice Forum • Storrs, CT			
February 2	Northeastern		Freitas Ice Forum • Storrs, CT			
February 3	Providence		Freitas Ice Forum • Storrs, CT			
February 10	at Vermont		Gutterson Fieldhouse • Burlington, VT			
February 11	at Vermont		Gutterson Fieldhouse • Burlington, VT			
February 16	Merrimack		Freitas Ice Forum • Storrs, CT			
February 17	Merrimack		Freitas Ice Forum • Storrs, CT			
WHEA Tournament
February 23	TBD*		TBD • (Quarterfinals, Game 1)			
February 24	TBD*		TBD • (Quarterfinals, Game 2)			
*Non-conference game. ^{#}Rankings from USCHO.com Poll.
