= 2017–18 NCAA Division I women's ice hockey season =

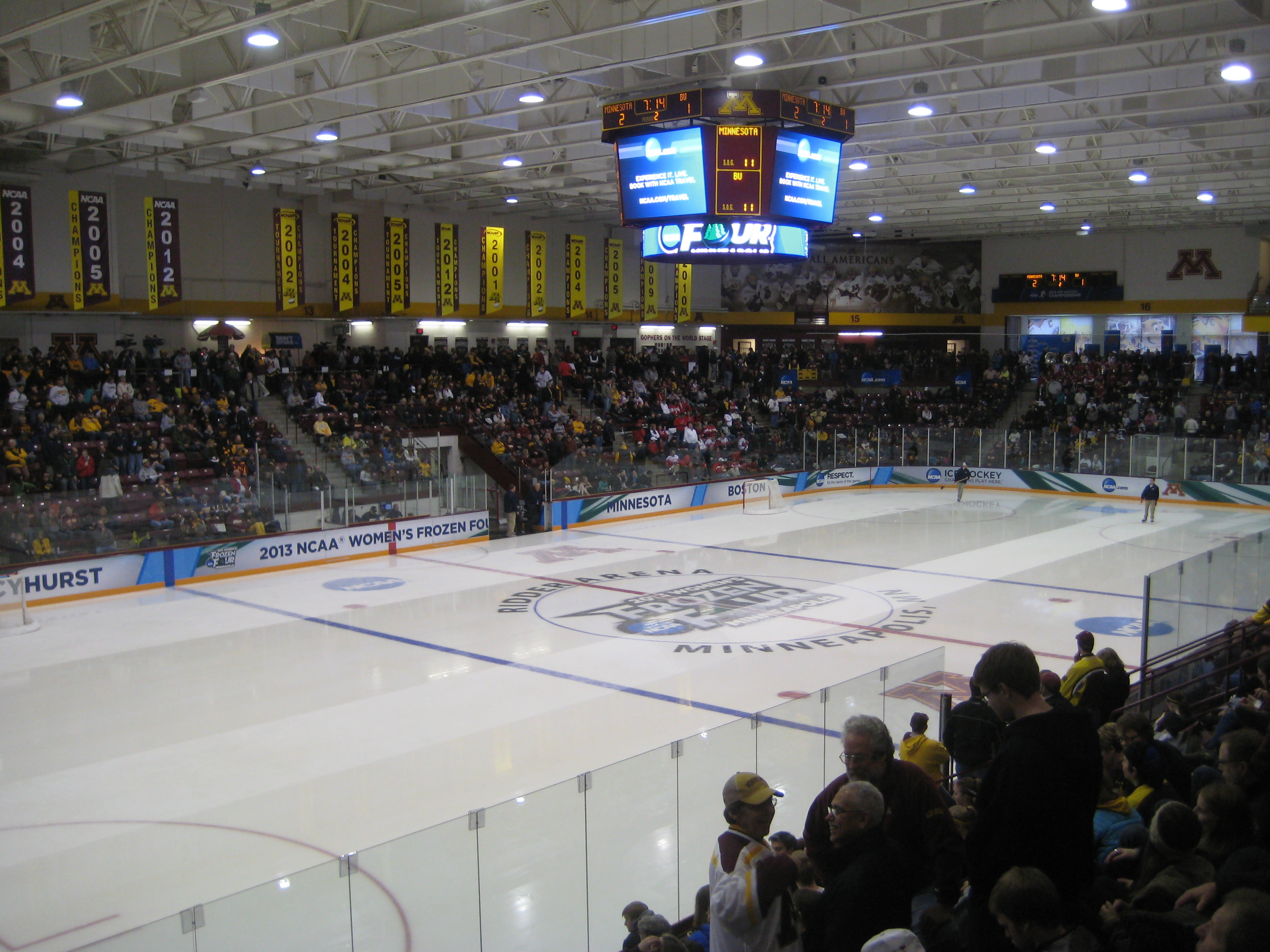
- Ridder Arena in Minneapolis, MN was the site for the 2018 Frozen Four (Women), hosted by the University of Minnesota
- Duration: September 23, 2016– March 20, 2017
- NCAA tournament: 2018
- National championship: Ridder Arena; Minneapolis, MN
- NCAA champion: Clarkson
- Patty Kazmaier Award: Daryl Watts, Boston College ()

The 2017–18 NCAA Division I women's ice hockey season began in September 2017 and ended with the 2018 NCAA Division I women's ice hockey tournament's championship game.

== Pre-season polls ==
The top 10 from USCHO.com and the top 10 from USA Today/USA Hockey Magazine, First place votes are in parentheses.

== Regular season ==
=== Standings ===
2017–18 College Hockey America standings
	Conference							Overall					
	GP	W	L	T	PTS	GF	GA	GP	W	L	T	GF	GA
#10 Robert Morris†	20	14	3	3	31	75	30	33	21	8	4	122	70
Mercyhurst*	20	13	4	3	29	58	24	37	18	15	4	94	74
Syracuse	20	11	8	1	23	53	43	36	13	21	2	76	98
Penn State	20	6	7	7	19	43	36	36	10	15	11	65	69
Lindenwood	20	8	12	0	16	37	57	31	10	20	1	61	92
RIT	20	1	19	0	2	19	95	35	4	28	3	42	141
Championship: † indicates conference regular season champion; * indicates conference tournament champion Rankings: USCHO.com

- Rankings based on number of wins in the conference

2017–18 ECAC Hockey standings
	Conference							Overall					
	GP	W	L	T	PTS	GF	GA	GP	W	L	T	GF	GA
#1 Clarkson†*	22	19	3	0	38	90	29	41	36	4	1	158	48
#2 Colgate†	22	19	3	0	38	80	35	41	34	6	1	150	70
#7 Cornell	22	15	5	2	32	66	42	33	21	9	3	100	65
#8 St. Lawrence	22	14	6	2	30	67	40	35	20	11	4	96	73
Quinnipiac	22	12	9	1	25	41	40	36	16	17	3	65	71
Princeton	22	11	0	1	23	60	43	32	14	14	4	79	64
Harvard	22	10	10	2	22	52	48	31	13	16	2	31	79
Yale	22	8	12	2	18	43	53	31	10	17	4	59	83
RPI	22	6	13	3	15	35	50	34	9	19	6	54	78
Union	22	5	15	2	12	45	78	34	7	22	5	65	121
Dartmouth	22	3	16	3	9	25	77	27	5	19	3	37	98
Brown	22	1	21	0	2	25	77	29	2	27	0	46	134
Championship: March 10, 2018 † indicates conference regular season champion; * indicates conference tournament champion Rankings: USCHO.com

2017–18 Western Collegiate Hockey Association standings
	Conference								Overall					
	GP	W	L	T	SW	PTS	GF	GA	GP	W	L	T	GF	GA
#2 Wisconsin†	24	20	2	2	2	64	81	29	37	31	4	2	123	44
#6 Ohio State	24	14	6	4	3	49	63	51	38	24	10	4	112	76
#5 Minnesota*	24	13	8	3	0	42	74	54	38	24	11	3	119	79
Minnesota Duluth	24	10	11	3	2	35	49	62	35	15	16	4	71	82
Bemidji State	24	9	13	2	1	30	60	68	38	16	19	3	90	96
St. Cloud State	24	6	14	4	1	23	41	59	33	8	20	5	52	82
Minnesota State	24	3	21	0	0	9	37	82	34	5	28	1	57	123
Championship: March 4, 2018 † indicates conference regular season champion; * indicates conference tournament champion Rankings: USCHO.com

2017–18 WHEA standings
	Conference							Overall					
	GP	W	L	T	PTS	GF	GA	GP	W	L	T	GF	GA
#5 Boston College	24	19	2	3	41	98	46	38	30	5	3	155	76
Providence	24	12	7	5	29	67	55	37	17	13	7	96	80
Maine	24	11	9	4	26	54	52	38	19	14	5	91	83
#8 Northeastern	24	11	11	2	24	69	64	39	19	17	3	107	100
New Hampshire	24	9	10	5	23	45	57	36	14	15	7	79	85
Boston University	24	8	11	5	21	72	66	37	14	17	6	113	100
Connecticut	24	7	11	6	20	47	56	39	16	14	9	88	76
Vermont	24	7	13	4	18	46	67	35	10	20	5	67	99
Merrimack	24	6	16	2	14	41	76	34	11	20	3	62	96
Championship: † indicates conference regular season champion; * indicates conference tournament champion Rankings: USCHO.com

2017–18 NEWHA
	Overall					
	GP	W	L	T	GF	GA
Saint Anselm	21	16	2	3	80	18
Sacred Heart	26	20	5	1	123	36
Holy Cross	20	11	6	3	81	38
Franklin Pierce	21	12	7	2	69	48
Saint Michael's	20	3	17	0	24	84
Post	21	2	19	2	26	129

== Player stats ==
=== Scoring leaders ===
GP = Games played; G = Goals; A = Assists; Pts = Points; PIM = Penalty minutes

Player	Class	Team	GP	G	A	Pts	PIM
Daryl Watts	Freshman	Boston College	38	42	40	82	34
Loren Gabel	Junior	Clarkson	41	36	39	75	24
Caitrin Lonergan	Sophomore	Boston College	38	30	45	75	28
Élizabeth Giguère	Freshman	Clarkson	41	27	44	71	24
Victoria Bach	Senior	Boston University	33	39	28	67	12
Taylor Moreland	Senior	Sacred Heart	35	30	36	66	12
Makenna Newkirk	Junior	Boston University	38	24	37	61	16
Rebecca Leslie	Senior	Boston University	33	24	33	57	22
Michaela Pejzlovám	Sophomore	Clarkson	41	26	29	55	16
Brittany Howard	Redshirt	Robert Morris	31	25	24	49	38

=== Leading goaltenders ===
GP = Games played; Min = Minutes played; W = Wins; L = Losses; T = Ties; GA = Goals against; SO = Shutouts; SV% = Save percentage; GAA = Goals against average

Player	Class	Team	GP	Min	W	L	T	GA	SO	SV%	GAA
Shea Tiley	Senior	Clarkson	40	2406	35	4	1	48	12	.945	1.20
Kristen Campbell	Redshirt	Wisconsin	38	2320	31	5	2	46	12	.939	1.19
Annie Bélanger	Senior	UConn	30	1822	13	11	6	56	4	.938	1.84
Kassidy Sauvé	Redshirt	Ohio State	32	1949	19	9	4	61	10	.938	1.88
Liz Auby	Sophomore	Colgate	10	601	9	1	0	12	1	.936	1.30

== Awards ==
=== Patty Kazmaier Award ===
Daryl Watts, Boston College

=== AHCA Coach of the Year ===
AHCA Coach of the Year Finalists
Coach	School
Greg Fargo	Colgate
Matt Desrosiers	Clarkson
Mark Johnson	Wisconsin
Nadine Muzerall	Ohio State
Tom O'Malley	Sacred Heart
Richard Reichenbach	Maine
Michael Sisti	Mercyhurst

=== Ivy League honors ===
- Kristin O'Neill, Cornell, PLAYER OF THE YEAR
- Maddie Mills, Cornell, ROOKIE OF THE YEAR
- Doug Derraugh, Cornell, COACH OF THE YEAR

==== All-Ivy ====
FIRST TEAM ALL-IVY

- Kristin O'Neill, Cornell, Forward
- Maddie Mills, Cornell, Forward
- Carly Bullock, Princeton, Forward
- Sarah Knee, Cornell, Defense
- Jaime Bourbonnais, Cornell, Defense
- Mallory Souliotis, Yale, Defense
- Marlène Boissonnault, Cornell, Goaltender

SECOND TEAM ALL-IVY

- Becca Gilmore, Harvard, Forward
- Karlie Lund, Princeton, Forward
- Greta Skarzynski, Yale, Forward
- Claire Thompson, Princeton, Defense
- Stephanie Sucharda, Princeton, Defense
- Stephanie Neatby, Princeton, Goaltender

HONORABLE MENTION ALL-IVY

- Sam Donovan, Brown, Forward
- Lenka Serdar, Cornell, Forward
- Kat Hughes, Harvard, Forward
- Christine Honor, Dartmouth, Goaltender
- Gianna Meloni, Yale, Goaltender
