= Carly Bullock =

American ice hockey player (born 1998)

- Born: April 4, 1998 (age 28) Eden Prairie, Minnesota, United States
- Height: 5 ft 7 in (170 cm)
- Weight: 139 lb (63 kg; 9 st 13 lb)
- Position: Forward
- Shoots: Right
- BTSH team Former teams: Vertz HC; KMH Budapest; Linköping HC; Princeton Tigers
- Playing career: 2016–present

Carly Elizabeth Bullock (born April 4, 1998) is an American professional ice hockey forward, currently playing with KMH Budapest in the European Women's Hockey League (EWHL). She currently holds the record as the highest scoring Princeton University player of the 21st century.

== Playing career ==
Bullock attended The Blake School in Minneapolis, Minnesota, where she was a five season member of the school's girls' ice hockey team, winning three state championships. During her first two seasons, she played alongside future Olympian Dani Cameranesi and in her senior season she served as team captain and was named a finalist for the 2016 Minnesota Ms. Hockey Award. She also played club hockey for the Minnesota Ice Cats.

From 2016 to 2020, she played with the Princeton Tigers women's ice hockey program of the ECAC Hockey conference, putting up 159 points in 131 NCAA Division I games. She was named ECAC Hockey Rookie of the Year in 2016–17. In her senior season, she became the fifth player in university history to score 30 goals in a season and was a finalist for the ECAC Best Forward Award. She finished her time at Princeton as the sixth all-time leading scorer in the university's history and as the top leading career scorer in the 21st century.

After graduating, she signed her first professional contract in Linköping HC Dam in Linköping, Sweden, joining her Princeton teammate Stephanie Neatby on the roster. She scored the game-winning goal in her first professional match, as Linköping beat AIK Hockey Dam 3–2 in their season opener.

== Personal life ==
Bullock graduated with a bachelor's degree in sociology from Princeton University in 2020. Outside of hockey, she enjoys fostering kittens and wakesurfing. She has an older sister, Jamie, who was a collegiate gymnast at the University of Minnesota and an older brother, Ryan, who played with the Big Green men's ice hockey program at Dartmouth College.
