= Reagan Rust =

American ice hockey player (born 1997)

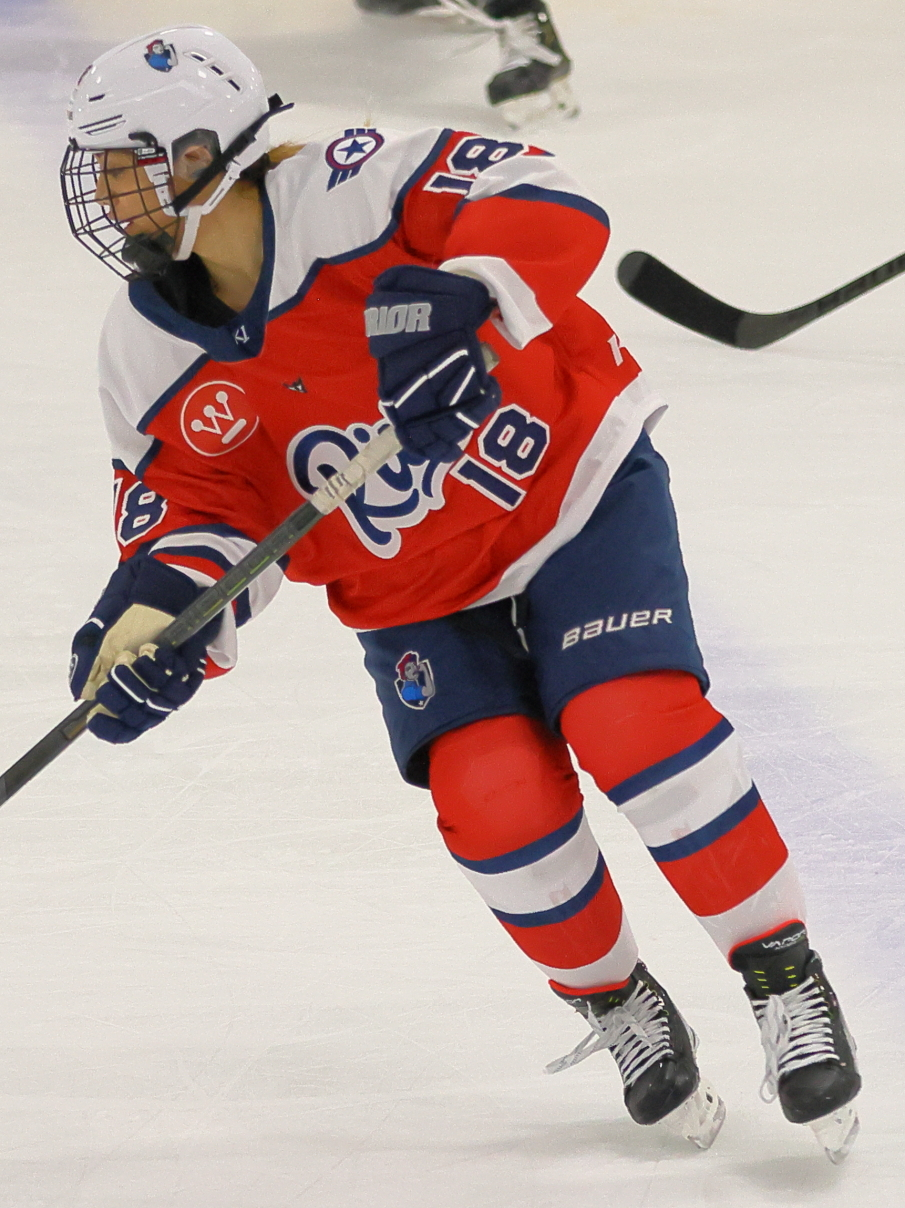
- Rust with the Metropolitan Riveters in 2022
- Born: February 25, 1997 (age 29) Southaven, Mississippi, U.S.
- Height: 171 cm (5 ft 7 in)
- Position: Forward
- Shot: Right
- Played for: Metropolitan Riveters; AIK Hockey; KMH Budapest; PWHPA; Boston University Terriers; RIT Tigers
- Playing career: 2015–2023

Reagan Rust (born February 25, 1997) is an American former ice hockey player who played in the now defunct Premier Hockey Federation (PHF) for the Metropolitan Riveters. She was the first NCAA Division I women's ice hockey player to have come from the state of Mississippi, and is a member of the Beanpot Hall of Fame.

== Career ==
=== Amateur ===
Rust was introduced to the sport of hockey at the age of five, joining a rec league organized by the Mississippi RiverKings. As a teenager, she commuted 12 hours every other weekend to play for the Pittsburgh Penguins Elite's U14 junior program. When she was fifteen, she moved to Lake Placid, New York to attend the National Sports Academy. After it shut down, she moved to Pittsburgh to return to the Penguins' U19 program, living with a billet family.

In 2015, Rust joined the newly promoted RIT Tigers women's ice hockey program in the NCAA Division I. She scored 18 points in 35 games in her rookie season, being named to the College Hockey America All-Rookie Team. After two years in Rochester, she transferred to Boston University. In her second and final year with the team, she was named an alternate captain. In the 2019 Beanpot, she scored the game-winning goal over Northeastern to win the semifinals, and scored the opening goal of the finals, leading the program to its first Beanpot title since 1981.

In February 2020, she was inducted into the Beanpot Hall of Fame.

=== Professional ===
In 2019, Rust originally planned to join the nearby Worcester Blades of the Canadian Women's Hockey League (CWHL), but the league collapsed before she could sign a contract. Instead, she joined over 150 players in the newly created Professional Women's Hockey Players Association (PWHPA), and would spend the 2019–20 season as an independent affiliate of the organization. During the season, she would also participate in the U.S. Pond Hockey Championships as part of a team from Nashville.

Before the 2020–21 season, Rust left the PWHPA to join KMH Budapest in the European Women's Hockey League (EWHL).

In 2017, Rust was offered a spot on the American roster for the 2017 IIHF Women's World Championship, as the entire team was striking with the goal of higher pay and better working conditions. She turned the offer down, choosing to stand in solidarity with the striking players.

== Personal life ==
Rust has spoken out about her struggles with depression and anxiety. She has a degree in economics.

Rust is Filipino American.

== Career statistics ==
			Regular Season					Playoffs
Season	Team	League	GP	G	A	Pts	PIM	GP	G	A	Pts	PIM
2015–16	Rochester Institute of Technology	NCAA	35	5	13	18	30	–	–	–	–	–
2016–17	Rochester Institute of Technology	NCAA	34	3	11	14	26	–	–	–	–	–
2017–18	Boston University	NCAA	37	5	13	18	30	–	–	–	–	–
2018–19	Boston University	NCAA	37	4	9	13	34	–	–	–	–	–
2019–20	–	PWHPA	–	–	–	–	–	–	–	–	–	–
2021–22	AIK Hockey Dam	SDHL	35	3	5	8	40	2	0	1	1	2
NCAA totals			143	17	46	63	120	–	–	–	–	–
SDHL totals			35	3	5	8	49	2	0	1	1	2
