= 2016–17 NCAA Division I women's ice hockey rankings =

- NCAA tournament: 2017
- Preseason No. 1 (USA Today): Wisconsin
- Preseason No. 1 (USCHO): Wisconsin
- NCAA Division I women's ice hockey rankings

2016–17 NCAA Division I women's ice hockey rankings

Two polls make up the 2016–17 NCAA Division I women's ice hockey rankings, the USCHO.com poll and the USA Today/USA Hockey Magazine poll. As the 2016–17 season progresses, rankings are updated weekly.

Legend
| | Increase in ranking |
| | Decrease in ranking |
| | Not ranked previous week |
| Italics | Number of first place votes |
| (#-#) | Win–loss–tie record |
| ? | Tied with team above or below also with this symbol |

== USCHO ==
| | Preseason Sep 19 | Week 1 Oct 3 | Week 2 Oct 10 | Week 3 Oct 17 | Week 4 Oct 24 | Week 5 Oct 31 | Week 6 Nov 7 | Week 7 Nov 14 | Week 8 Nov 21 | Week 9 Nov 28 | Week 10 Dec 5 | Week 11 Dec 12 | Week 12 Jan 9 | Week 13 Jan 16 | Week 14 Jan 23 | Week 15 Jan 30 | Week 16 Feb 6 | Week 17 Feb 13 | Week 18 Feb 20 | Week 19 Feb 27 | Week 20 Mar 6 | Week 21 Mar 20 | |
|---|---|---|---|---|---|---|---|---|---|---|---|---|---|---|---|---|---|---|---|---|---|---|---|
| 1. | Wisconsin (10) | Wisconsin (2–0–0) (14) | Wisconsin (3–0–1) (14) | Wisconsin (5–0–1) (15) | Wisconsin (7–0–1) (15) | Wisconsin (9–0–1) (15) | Wisconsin (11–0–1) (15) | Wisconsin (11–0–1) (15) | Wisconsin (12–1–1) (13) | Wisconsin (14–1–1) (13) | Wisconsin (15–2–1) (14) | Wisconsin (17–2–1) (15) | Wisconsin (18–2–1) (15) | Wisconsin (20–2–1) (15) | Wisconsin (22–2–1) (15) | Wisconsin (24–2–1) (15) | Wisconsin (26–2–1) (15) | Wisconsin (27–2–2) (15) | Wisconsin (27–2–4) (15) | Wisconsin (29–2–4) (15) | Wisconsin (31–2–4) (15) | Clarkson (32–4–5) (15) | 1. |
| 2. | Minnesota (3) | Minnesota (2–0–0) (1) | Quinnipiac (4–0–0) (1) | Minnesota (5–1–0) | Minnesota (7–1–0) | Minnesota (9–1–0) | Minnesota (11–1–0) | Minnesota (11–1–0) | Minnesota (11–1–2) | Minnesota (13–1–2) | Minnesota (14–2–2) | Minnesota (15–3–2) | Minnesota (16–3–2) | Minnesota Duluth (15–4–3) | Minnesota Duluth (16–4–4) | Minnesota Duluth (18–4–4) | Minnesota Duluth (20–4–4) | Minnesota Duluth (20–5–5) | Minnesota Duluth (22–5–5) | Minnesota Duluth (24–5–5) | Clarkson (29–4–5) | Wisconsin (33–3–4) | 2. |
| 3. | Boston College (2) | Quinnipiac (2–0–0) | Minnesota (3–1–0) | Quinnipiac (5–1–0) | Minnesota Duluth (4–2–2) | Minnesota Duluth (6–2–2) | Minnesota Duluth (6–2–2) | Minnesota Duluth (7–2–3) | St. Lawrence (13–0–1) (2) | St. Lawrence (15–0–1) (2) | Minnesota Duluth (12–3–3) | Clarkson (15–3–4) | Clarkson (15–3–4) | Clarkson (17–3–4) | Clarkson (18–4–4) | Clarkson (20–4–4) | St. Lawrence (23–3–2) | Clarkson (23–4–5) | Clarkson (25–4–5) | Clarkson (27–4–5) | Minnesota Duluth (25–6–5) | Boston College (28–6–5) | 3. |
| 4. | Quinnipiac | Clarkson (2–0–0) | Minnesota Duluth (3–0–1) | Minnesota Duluth (3–2–1) | Boston College (4–2–2) | Boston College (6–2–2) | St. Lawrence (9–0–1) | St. Lawrence (11–0–1) | Minnesota Duluth (8–3–3) | Minnesota Duluth (10–3–3) | St. Lawrence (15–1–2) T-4 (1) | St. Lawrence (15–1–2) | Minnesota Duluth (13–4–3) | Minnesota (16–5–2) | Minnesota (17–5–3) | Minnesota (19–5–3) | Clarkson (21–4–5) | Minnesota (23–5–3) | Minnesota (23–5–5) | St. Lawrence (26–4–4) | Boston College (27–5–5) | Minnesota (26–8–5) | 4. |
| 5. | Clarkson | Boston College (0–1–1) | Boston College (2–1–1) | Colgate (4–0–0) | Quinnipiac (5–2–1) | Quinnipiac (7–2–1) | Colgate (10–0–1) | Colgate (12–0–1) | Clarkson (12–3–1) | Clarkson (13–3–2) | Clarkson (14–3–3) T-4 | Minnesota Duluth (13–4–3) | St. Lawrence (16–2–2) | St. Lawrence (18–2–2) | St. Lawrence (19–3–2) | St. Lawrence (21–3–2) | Minnesota (21–5–3) | St. Lawrence (23–4–3) | St. Lawrence (24–4–4) | Minnesota (25–6–5) | Minnesota (25–7–5) | Minnesota Duluth (25–7–5) | 5. |
| 6. | North Dakota | Minnesota Duluth (1–0–1) | Colgate (4–0–0) | Boston College (3–2–1) | Colgate (5–0–1) | Colgate (7–0–1) | Boston College (7–3–2) | Boston College (9–3–2) | Boston College (9–3–3) | Boston College (10–3–3) | Boston College (11–3–3) | Boston College (12–3–3) | Boston College (13–3–4) | Boston College (16–3–4) | Boston College (18–3–4) | Boston College (19–3–4) | Boston College (20–3–5) | Boston College (22–4–5) | Boston College (23–5–5) | Boston College (25–5–5) | St. Lawrence (26–5–4) | St. Lawrence (26–6–4) | 6. |
| 7. | Princeton | North Dakota (1–0–1) | Clarkson (2–1–1) | St. Lawrence (3–0–1) | St. Lawrence (5–0–1) | St. Lawrence (7–0–1) | Clarkson (8–3–1) | Clarkson (10–3–1) | North Dakota (6–4–4) | Colgate (14–2–1) | Colgate (15–2–1) | Colgate (15–2–2) | Robert Morris (14–1–5) | Robert Morris (15–2–5) | Robert Morris (16–2–6) | Cornell (14–6–3) | Cornell (16–6–3) | Cornell (17–6–4) | Cornell (17–7–5) | Cornell (19–7–5) | Cornell (20–8–5) | Cornell (20–9–5) | 7. |
| 8. | Colgate | Colgate (2–0–0) | Bemidji State (3–1–0) | Clarkson (2–3–1) | Clarkson (4–3–1) | Clarkson (6–3–1) | Quinnipiac (7–4–1) | Quinnipiac (9–4–1) | Quinnipiac (10–4–2) | Quinnipiac (11–4–3) | Quinnipiac (13–4–3) | Quinnipiac (13–4–3) | Colgate (15–3–3) | Quinnipiac (16–6–4) | Cornell (13–6–2) | Robert Morris (17–3–6) | Robert Morris (17–3–6) | Robert Morris (19–3–6) | Princeton (18–8–3) | Princeton (20–9–3) | Robert Morris (24–4–6) | Robert Morris (24–5–6) | 8. |
| 9. | Northeastern | Boston University (1–0–0) | St. Lawrence (3–0–1) | North Dakota (4–1–1) | Princeton (2–0–0) | North Dakota (6–3–1) | North Dakota (6–3–1) | North Dakota (6–4–2) | Colgate (12–2–1) | North Dakota (7–5–4) | Robert Morris (12–1–5) | Robert Morris (12–1–5) | Quinnipiac (15–5–4) | Princeton (13–6–3) | Princeton (13–6–3) | Princeton (13–6–3) | Quinnipiac (18–7–5) | Princeton (16–8–3) | Robert Morris (20–4–6) | Robert Morris (22–4–6) | Princeton (20–10–3) | Princeton (20–10–3) | 9. |
| 10. | Boston University | Princeton (0–0–0) | North Dakota (2–1–1) | Bemidji State (4–2–0) | Bemidji State (4–3–1) | Princeton (3–0–1) | Princeton (3–2–1) | Northeastern (10–3–1) | Northeastern (10–3–3) | Northeastern (10–4–3) | North Dakota (7–6–5) | North Dakota (9–6–5) | Boston University (12–7–2) | Cornell (11–5–2) | Quinnipiac (16–6–5) | Quinnipiac (16–6–5) | Princeton (15–7–3) | Quinnipiac (18–8–6) | Quinnipiac (20–8–6) | Quinnipiac (21–10–6) | Northeastern (22–12–3) | Northeastern (22–12–3) | 10. |
| | Preseason Sep 19 | Week 1 Oct 3 | Week 2 Oct 10 | Week 3 Oct 17 | Week 4 Oct 24 | Week 5 Oct 31 | Week 6 Nov 7 | Week 7 Nov 14 | Week 8 Nov 21 | Week 9 Nov 28 | Week 10 Dec 5 | Week 11 Dec 12 | Week 12 Jan 9 | Week 13 Jan 16 | Week 14 Jan 23 | Week 15 Jan 30 | Week 16 Feb 6 | Week 17 Feb 13 | Week 18 Feb 20 | Week 19 Feb 27 | Week 20 Mar 6 | Week 21 Mar 20 | |
| | | Dropped: Northeastern | Dropped: Boston University Princeton | None | Dropped: North Dakota | Dropped: Bemidji State | None | Dropped: Princeton | None | None | Dropped: Northeastern | None | Dropped: North Dakota | Dropped: Colgate Boston University | None | None | None | None | None | None | Dropped: Quinnipiac | None | |

== USA Today ==
| | Preseason Sep 27 | Week 1 Oct 4 | Week 2 Oct 11 | Week 3 Oct 18 | Week 4 Oct 25 | Week 5 Nov 1 | Week 6 Nov 8 | Week 7 Nov 15 | Week 8 Nov 22 | Week 9 Nov 29 | Week 10 Dec 6 | Week 11 Dec 13 | Week 12 Jan 10 | Week 13 Jan 17 | Week 14 Jan 24 | Week 15 Jan 31 | Week 16 Feb 7 | Week 17 Feb 14 | Week 18 Feb 21 | Week 19 Feb 28 | Week 20 Mar 7 | Week 21 Mar 21 | |
|---|---|---|---|---|---|---|---|---|---|---|---|---|---|---|---|---|---|---|---|---|---|---|---|
| 1. | Wisconsin (15) | Wisconsin (2–0–0) (17) | Wisconsin (3–0–1) (19) | Wisconsin (5–0–1) (19) | Wisconsin (7–0–1) (19) | Wisconsin (9–0–1) (19) | Wisconsin (11–0–1) (19) | Wisconsin (11–0–1) (19) | Wisconsin (12–1–1) (18) | Wisconsin (14–1–1) (18) | Wisconsin (15–2–1) (17) | Wisconsin (17–2–1) (18) | Wisconsin (18–2–1) (19) | Wisconsin (20–2–1) (19) | Wisconsin (22–2–1) (19) | Wisconsin (24–2–1) (19) | Wisconsin (26–2–1) (19) | Wisconsin (27–2–2) (19) | Wisconsin (27–2–4) (19) | Wisconsin (27–2–4) (19) | Wisconsin (31–2–4) (19) | Clarkson (32–4–5) (19) | 1. |
| 2. | Minnesota (3) | Minnesota (2–0–0) (2) | Minnesota (3–1–0) | Minnesota (5–1–0) | Minnesota (7–1–0) | Minnesota (9–1–0) | Minnesota (11–1–0) | Minnesota (11–1–0) | Minnesota (11–1–2) | Minnesota (13–1–2) | Minnesota (14–2–2) (1) | Minnesota (15–3–2) (1) | Minnesota (16–3–2) | Minnesota Duluth (15–4–3) | Minnesota Duluth (16–4–4) | Minnesota Duluth (18–4–4) | Minnesota Duluth (20–4–4) | Minnesota Duluth (20–5–5) | Minnesota Duluth (22–5–5) | Minnesota Duluth (22–5–5) | Clarkson (29–4–5) | Wisconsin (33–3–4) | 2. |
| 3. | Boston College (1) | Quinnipiac (2–0–0) | Quinnipiac (4–0–0) | Quinnipiac (5–1–0) | Minnesota Duluth (4–2–2) | Minnesota Duluth (6–2–2) | Minnesota Duluth (6–2–2) | Minnesota Duluth (7–2–3) | St. Lawrence (14–0–1) T-3 (1) | St. Lawrence (15–0–1) (1) | Minnesota Duluth (12–3–3) | Clarkson (15–3–4) T-3 | Clarkson (15–3–4) | Clarkson (17–3–4) | Clarkson (18–4–4) | Clarkson (20–4–4) | St. Lawrence (23–3–2) | Clarkson (23–4–5) | Clarkson (25–4–5) | Clarkson (25–4–5) | Minnesota Duluth (25–6–5) | Boston College (28–6–5) | 3. |
| 4. | Quinnipiac | Clarkson (2–0–0) | Minnesota Duluth (3–0–1) | Minnesota Duluth (3–2–1) | Quinnipiac (5–2–1) | Boston College (6–2–2) | St. Lawrence (9–0–1) | St. Lawrence (11–0–1) | Minnesota Duluth (8–3–3) T-3 | Minnesota Duluth (10–3–3) | St. Lawrence (15–1–2) T-4 (1) | St. Lawrence (15–1–2) T-3 | Minnesota Duluth (13–4–3) | Minnesota (16–5–2) | Minnesota (17–5–3) | Minnesota (19–5–3) | Minnesota (21–5–3) | Minnesota (23–5–3) | Minnesota (23–5–5) | Minnesota (23–5–5) T-4 | Boston College (27–5–5) | Minnesota (26–8–5) | 4. |
| 5. | Clarkson | Boston College (0–1–1) | Boston College (2–1–1) | Colgate (4–0–0) | Boston College (4–2–2) | Quinnipiac (7–2–1) | Colgate (10–0–1) | Colgate (12–0–1) | Clarkson (12–3–1) | Clarkson (13–3–2) | Clarkson (14–3–3) T-4 | Minnesota Duluth (13–4–3) | St. Lawrence (16–2–2) | St. Lawrence (18–2–2) | St. Lawrence (19–3–2) | St. Lawrence (21–3–2) | Clarkson (21–4–5) | St. Lawrence (23–4–3) | St. Lawrence (24–4–4) | St. Lawrence (24–4–4) T-4 | Minnesota (25–7–5) | Minnesota Duluth (25–7–5) | 5. |
| 6. | North Dakota | North Dakota (1–0–1) | Colgate (4–0–0) | St. Lawrence (3–0–1) | St. Lawrence (5–0–1) | Colgate (7–0–1) T-6 | Clarkson (8–3–1) | Clarkson (10–3–1) | Boston College (9–3–3) | Boston College (10–3–3) | Boston College (11–3–3) | Boston College (12–3–3) | Boston College (13–3–4) | Boston College (16–3–4) | Boston College (18–3–4) | Boston College (19–3–4) | Boston College (20–3–5) | Boston College (22–4–5) | Boston College (23–5–5) | Boston College (23–5–5) | St. Lawrence (26–5–4) | St. Lawrence (26–6–4) | 6. |
| 7. | Princeton | Colgate (2–0–0) | Clarkson (2–1–1) | Boston College (3–2–1) | Colgate (5–0–1) | St. Lawrence (7–0–1) T-6 | Boston College (7–3–2) | Boston College (9–3–2) | North Dakota (6–4–4) | Colgate (14–2–1) | Colgate (15–2–1) | Colgate (15–2–2) | Robert Morris (14–1–5) | Robert Morris (15–2–5) | Robert Morris (16–2–6) | Cornell (14–6–3) | Cornell (16–6–3) | Cornell (17–6–4) | Cornell (17–7–5) | Cornell (17–7–5) | Cornell (20–8–5) | Cornell (20–9–5) | 7. |
| 8. | Colgate | Minnesota Duluth (1–0–1) | Bemidji State (3–1–0) | Clarkson (2–3–1) | Clarkson (4–3–1) | Clarkson (6–3–1) | Quinnipiac (7–4–1) | Quinnipiac (9–4–1) | Colgate (12–2–1) | Quinnipiac (11–4–3) | Quinnipiac (13–4–3) | Quinnipiac (13–4–3) | Quinnipiac (15–5–4) | Quinnipiac (16–6–4) | Cornell (13–6–2) | Robert Morris (17–3–6) | Robert Morris (17–3–6) | Robert Morris (19–3–6) | Princeton (18–8–3) | Princeton (18–8–3) | Robert Morris (24–4–6) | Robert Morris (24–5–6) | 8. |
| 9. | Northeastern | Princeton (0–0–0) | St. Lawrence (3–0–1) | Bemidji State (4–2–0) | Princeton (2–0–0) | North Dakota (5–3–1) | North Dakota (6–3–1) | North Dakota (6–4–2) | Quinnipiac (10–4–2) | North Dakota (7–5–4) | Robert Morris (12–1–5) | Robert Morris (12–1–5) | Colgate (15–3–3) | Princeton (13–6–3) | Princeton (13–6–3) | Princeton (13–6–3) | Quinnipiac (18–7–5) | Princeton (16–8–3) | Robert Morris (20–4–6) | Robert Morris (20–4–6) | Princeton (20–10–3) | Princeton (20–10–3) | 9. |
| 10. | Boston University | Boston University (1–0–0) | North Dakota (2–1–1) | North Dakota (4–1–1) | Bemidji State (4–3–1) | Princeton (3–0–1) | Robert Morris (7–1–4) | Northeastern (10–3–1) | Northeastern (10–3–3) | Northeastern (10–4–3) | North Dakota (7–6–5) | North Dakota (9–6–5) | North Dakota (10–7–5) | Cornell (11–5–2) | Quinnipiac (16–6–5) | Quinnipiac (16–6–5) | Princeton (15–7–3) | Quinnipiac (18–8–6) | Quinnipiac (20–8–6) | Quinnipiac (20–8–6) | Northeastern (22–12–3) | Northeastern (22–12–3) | 10. |
| | Preseason Sep 27 | Week 1 Oct 4 | Week 2 Oct 11 | Week 3 Oct 18 | Week 4 Oct 25 | Week 5 Nov 1 | Week 6 Nov 8 | Week 7 Nov 15 | Week 8 Nov 22 | Week 9 Nov 29 | Week 10 Dec 6 | Week 11 Dec 13 | Week 12 Jan 10 | Week 13 Jan 17 | Week 14 Jan 24 | Week 15 Jan 31 | Week 16 Feb 7 | Week 17 Feb 14 | Week 18 Feb 21 | Week 19 Feb 28 | Week 20 Mar 7 | Week 21 Mar 21 | |
| | | Dropped: Northeastern | Dropped: Boston University Princeton | None | Dropped: North Dakota | Dropped: Bemidji State | Dropped: Princeton | Dropped: Robert Morris | None | None | Dropped: Northeastern | None | None | Dropped: Colgate Boston University | None | None | None | None | None | None | Dropped: Quinnipiac | None | |
