= Whittemore Center =

Sports venue in Durham, New Hampshire, United States

- The Whitt
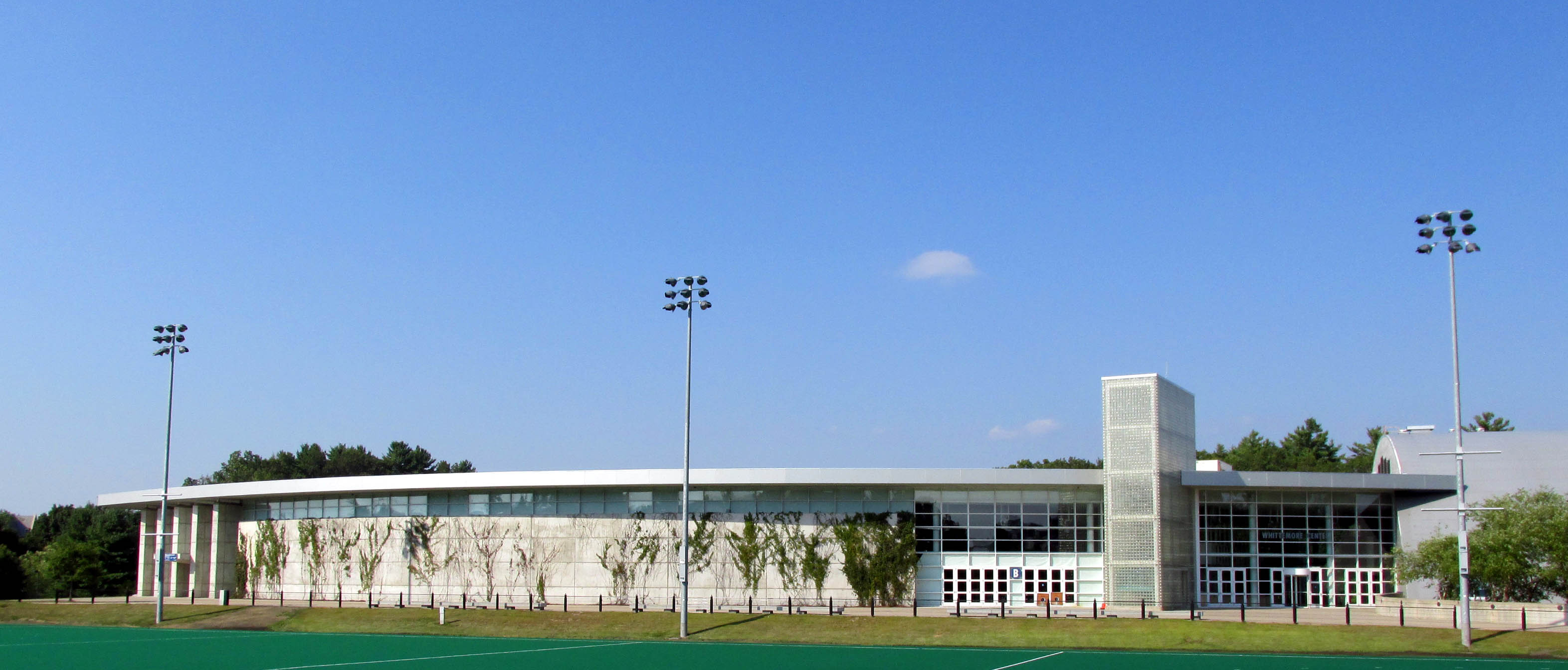
- The arena as seen in 2013
- Interactive map of Whittemore Center
- Full name: Whittemore Center Arena
- Address: 128 Main Street
- Location: Durham, New Hampshire, U.S.
- Coordinates: 43.13974°N 70.93443°W
- Owner: University of New Hampshire
- Operator: University of New Hampshire
- Capacity: 6,501 (hockey and basketball); 5,550 (end-stage concerts)
- Surface: 200 by 90 feet (61 m × 27 m) (ice hockey)

Construction
- Opened: November 1995; 30 years ago
- Cost: $30 million ($63.4 million in 2025)

Tenants
- UNH Men's Hockey; UNH Women's Hockey; Oyster River High School Hockey; NCAA Women's Frozen Four (2002, 2005, 2016, 2024)

Website
- whittemore-center-arena

Whittemore Center Arena, known colloquially as The Whitt, is a multi-purpose arena in Durham, New Hampshire, United States, on the campus of the University of New Hampshire. Located at 128 Main Street in Durham, the arena is home to the New Hampshire Wildcats men's and women's ice hockey teams. The arena was New Hampshire's largest until the Verizon Wireless Arena (now the SNHU Arena) opened in Manchester in 2001. The arena can seat 6,501 for ice hockey and basketball games, and 7,200 for concerts and similar events.

== History ==
The facility was built for $30 million and opened in November 1995. It was dedicated to Frederick B. Whittemore (a son of Laurence F. Whittemore) and his family on May 5, 1996. Through the end of the 2006–2007 academic year, the arena was managed by Global Spectrum, but UNH Campus Recreation took over management before the 2007 academic year.

The arena is adjacent to its predecessor, Snively Arena, which is still standing and is used as a recreation facility. It is also adjacent to the Durham–UNH station, served by Amtrak, and it is across the street from Wildcat Stadium, home of the Wildcats football team.

Both the Wildcats men's ice hockey and Wildcats women's ice hockey team play their home games at the arena. The hockey rink originally had a full Olympic-sized sheet of ice, 200 by 100 feet (61 m × 30 m), but the rink was reduced slightly to almost "NHL size", 200 by 90 feet (61 by 27 m), during a 2022 renovation. In 2002, 2005, 2016, and 2024, UNH and the Whittemore Center hosted the NCAA Women's Frozen Four. The lobby is decorated with heroic portraits of past men's and women's All-American hockey players.

The Wildcats men's basketball and Wildcats women's basketball teams (which currently draw roughly 1,000 fans per game on average) normally play across the street at Lundholm Gymnasium, which is attached to Wildcat Stadium. A few home basketball games have been held at the Whittemore Center. The arena is also a venue for many concerts, trade shows, and events.

The consecration of Bishop Gene Robinson occurred in this arena on 2 November 2003. Robinson is known for being the first openly gay bishop within the Episcopal Church.

In September 2015 a new high definition center-hung scoreboard was unveiled. The main screens on each side of the board are 9 by 15 feet (2.7 by 4.6 m).

During the summer of 2017, the arena replaced its former HID fixture lighting system with a new LED lighting system which led to much more even lighting in the arena and no more loud hum produced by the former system.

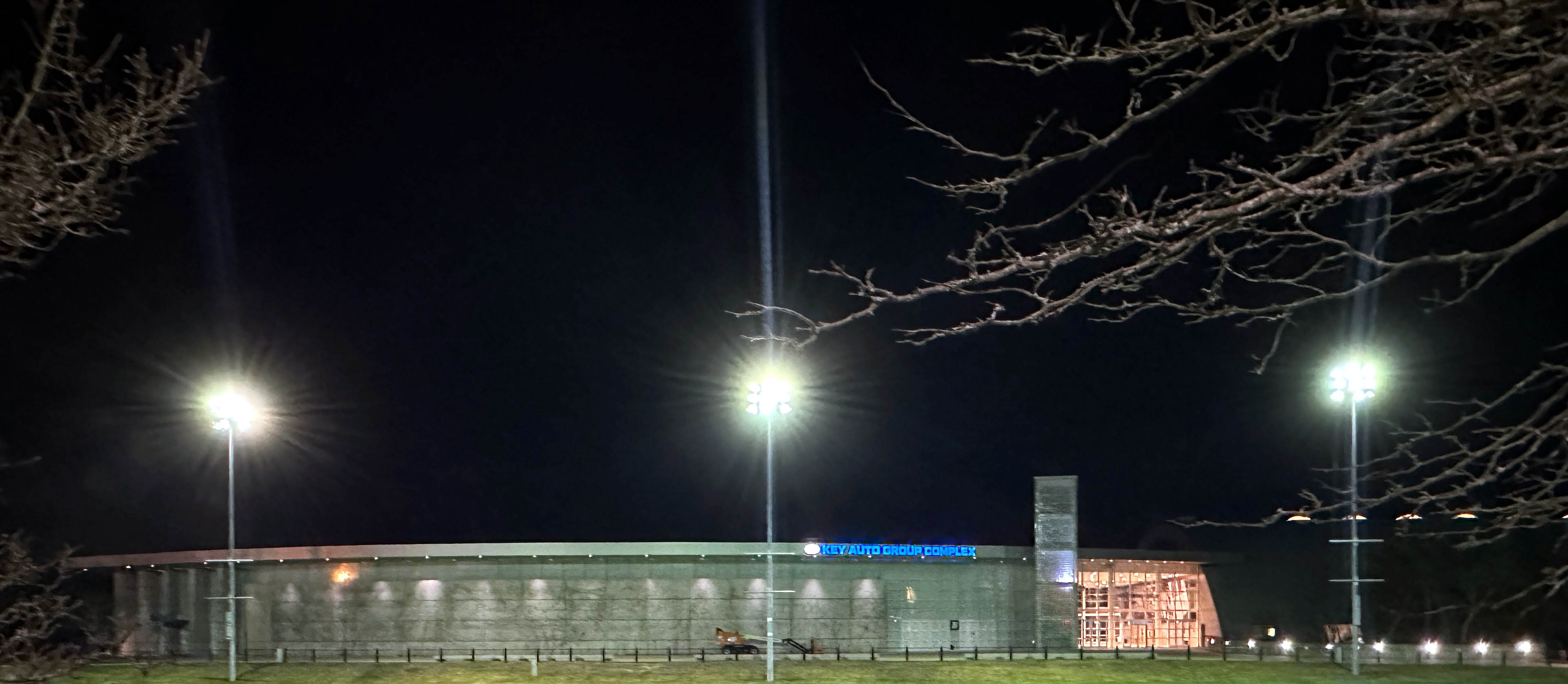
Whittemore Center at night, including Key Auto Group signage

In June and September 2020, the New Hampshire House of Representatives met in the arena due to social distancing requirements as a result of the COVID-19 pandemic. In December 2020, both the House and Senate met outside the arena. The House convened on the field hockey pitch in front of the arena. The Senate convened on a nearby parking lot, before joining the House for a joint convention on the field hockey pitch to certify the results of the 2020 general election and to elect the secretary of state and the state treasurer.

In April 2022, $6 million UNH spent on renovations, that included a reduction in the size of the ice surface. The renovations also include installing new glass, more forgiving NHL-style boards, and a new sound system. This funding is part of a broader renovation project that aims to raise $16 million for facility improvements, which has also been supported by private donations, such as a $4 million gift from Anthony DiLorenzo, a UNH alumnus and founder of Key Auto Group

In August 2023, local multiple car dealership owner and 1987 UNH alumni Anthony DiLorenzo gave a $4 million gift to the University. This gift is to expand training and support facilities as part of the $23 million UNH Hockey Renovation Project. Locker rooms, sports areas, video and study rooms, will all be added and funded through support from both the state of New Hampshire and philanthropic donations. In addition to these advancements, Northeast Passage sled hockey will be given a fully accessible locker room. The Whittemore center and the Hamel Recreation Center became the Key Auto Group Complex.

== Concerts and other events ==
The Whittemore Center can host a wide range of events, including concerts, sports events, and other student activities. In 1995 the center became a prominent location for live music performances, largely through the efforts of SCOPE (Student Committee on Popular Entertainment), a student-run organization at UNH.

SCOPE has created and offered surveys for students at UNH to fill out and choose who they will most like to see perform at the Whitt from a list of options created by members of SCOPE.

Some performances include:

- 1990s: Dave Matthews Band (1996), Bob Dylan (1999), Matchbox Twenty (1998)
- 2000s: Willie Nelson (2004, 2008), Bob Dylan (2004), Snoop Dogg (2008)
- 2010s: Avicii (2011), David Guetta (2012), Kendrick Lamar (2013), Galantis (2017)
- Recent events: Playboi Carti (2019), Brett Young (2023), Rae Sremmurd (2023), Flo Rida (2024)

Along with concerts, this arena was the host for other events such as Broadway musicals (Cats and Jesus Christ Superstar) and also large University events such as presidential inaugurations, campaign celebrations and other important academic ceremonies.

For example, the center has also been holding political rallies for campaign runners. In December 2023, the Whittemore Center held a venue for Donald Trump's political rally in 2023 and Obama in 2016. It is one of the largest event spaces in the state, making it an ideal location for accommodating large crowds.

== Free Skate ==
The Whittemore Center allows for open skate, as well as stick and puck opportunities. The Whitt provides open skate to University of New Hampshire faculty and staff, as well as enrolled students. Public skate is available to the public during the majority of the winter months. Open skate for UNH staff and students is free, and public skate has an $8 entry fee per person. Skate rentals are also available for $3, this is first come first serve as the number of skates are limited. Anyone is able to go to the campus recreation website to look at open skate and puck and stick available spots for any winter season.
