= 2017–18 NCAA Division I women's ice hockey rankings =

- NCAA tournament: 2018
- Preseason No. 1 (USA Today): Clarkson
- Preseason No. 1 (USCHO): Clarkson
- NCAA Division I women's ice hockey rankings

Two polls make up the 2017–18 NCAA Division I women's ice hockey rankings, the USCHO.com poll and the USA Today/USA Hockey Magazine poll. As the 2017–18 season progresses, rankings are updated weekly.

== Legend ==
	Increase in ranking
	Decrease in ranking
	Not ranked previous week
Italics	Number of first place votes
(#–#)	Win–loss–tie record
?	Tied with team above or below also with this symbol

== USCHO ==
	Preseason Sep 18	Week 1 Oct 2	Week 2 Oct 9	Week 3 Oct 16	Week 4 Oct 23	Week 5 Oct 30	Week 6 Nov 6	Week 7 Nov 13	Week 8 Nov 20	Week 9 Nov 27	Week 10 Dec 4	Week 11 Dec 11	Week 12 Jan 8	Week 13 Jan 15	Week 14 Jan 22	Week 15 Jan 29	Week 16 Feb 5	Week 17 Feb 12	Week 18 Feb 19	Week 19 Feb 26	Week 20 Mar 5	Week 21 Mar 19	
1.	Clarkson (10)	Wisconsin (4–0–0) (10)	Wisconsin (6–0–0) (10)	Wisconsin (8–0–0) (10)	Wisconsin (10–0–0) (11)	Wisconsin (12–0–0) (15)	Wisconsin (14–0–0) (15)	Wisconsin (16–0–0) (15)	Wisconsin (16–0–0) (15)	Wisconsin (17–1–0) (15)	Wisconsin (19–1–0) (15)	Wisconsin (21–1–0) (15)	Wisconsin (21–1–0) (15)	Wisconsin (23–1–0) (15)	Wisconsin (24–1–1) (15)	Wisconsin (26–1–1) (15)	Clarkson (26–3–1) (7)	Wisconsin (27–3–2) (12)	Wisconsin (29–3–2) (15)	Wisconsin (29–3–2) (14)	Clarkson (33–4–1) (14)	Clarkson (36–4–1) (15)	1.
2.	Wisconsin (1)	Clarkson (1–0–1) (5)	Clarkson (3–0–1) (5)	Clarkson (5–0–1) (5)	Clarkson (7–0–1) (4)	Boston College (6–0–1)	Boston College (8–0–1)	Boston College (9–1–1)	Colgate (13–1–0)	Boston College (11–1–2)	Boston College (13–1–3)	Boston College (15–1–3)	Boston College (18–1–3)	Boston College (tied) (19–2–3)	Colgate (22–3–1)	Clarkson (23–3–1)	Wisconsin (26–3–1) (5)	Clarkson (27–4–1) (2)	Clarkson (29–4–1)	Clarkson (31–4–1) (1)	Wisconsin (30–4–2) (1)	Colgate (34–6–1)	2.
3.	Minnesota (4)	Boston College (0–0–0)	Boston College (2–0–0)	Boston College (2–0–0)	Boston College (4–0–1)	Clarkson (8–1–1)	Clarkson (10–1–1)	Colgate (11–1–0)	Boston College (10–1–2)	Colgate (14–2–0)	Clarkson (14–3–1)	Clarkson (17–3–1)	Clarkson (17–3–1)	Clarkson (tied) (19–3–1)	Boston College (tied) (22–2–3)	Boston College (24–2–3)	Boston College (24–2–3) (3)	Colgate (27–4–1) (1)	Boston College (28–3–3)	Boston College (30–3–3)	Colgate (32–5–1)	Wisconsin (31–5–2)	3.
4.	Boston College	Minnesota (1–1–0) (T4)	St. Lawrence (1–0–1)	Ohio State (5–0–1)	Ohio State (7–0–1)	Ohio State (7–0–1)	Colgate (9–1–0)	Clarkson (11–2–1)	Clarkson (12–3–1)	Clarkson (12–3–1)	Colgate (15–3–0)	Colgate (15–3–1)	Colgate (17–3–1)	Colgate (19–3–1)	Clarkson (tied) (21–3–1)	Colgate (23–4–1)	Colgate (25–4–1)	Boston College (25–3–3)	Colgate (29–4–1)	Colgate (31–4–1)	Boston College (30–4–3)	Ohio State (24–11–4)	4.
5.	Minnesota Duluth	Minnesota Duluth (2–0–0) (T4)	Minnesota Duluth (2–2–0)	Colgate (4–0–0)	Colgate (6–0–0)	Colgate (7–1–0)	Ohio State (7–2–1)	Ohio State (9–2–1)	Ohio State (10–2–2)	Ohio State (11–3–2)	Cornell (8–4–1)	Cornell (8–4–1)	Minnesota (15–5–2)	Minnesota (17–6–2)	Ohio State (17–5–4)	Cornell (13–7–2)	Ohio State (19–7–4)	Cornell (17–7–3)	Cornell (19–7–3)	Ohio State (23–9–4)	Minnesota (24–10–3)	Boston College (30–5–3)	5.
6.	St. Lawrence	St. Lawrence (1–0–1)	Northeastern (2–1–1)	St. Lawrence (2–0–3)	Minnesota (5–2–1)	Minnesota (5–4–1)	Minnesota (7–4–1)	Minnesota (9–4–1)	Minnesota (11–4–1)	Minnesota (13–4–1)	Minnesota (14–5–1)	Minnesota (15–5–2)	Cornell (8–6–1)	Cornell (11–6–1)	Cornell (12–6–2)	Ohio State (17–7–4)	Cornell (14–7–3)	Ohio State (20–8–4)	Ohio State (21–9–4)	Cornell (21–8–3)	Ohio State (23–10–4)	Minnesota (24–11–3)	6.
7.	Cornell	Cornell (0–0–0)	Ohio State (3–0–1)	Minnesota (3–2–1)	Northeastern (tied) (4–3–1)	St. Lawrence (3–3–2)	Cornell (3–1–0)	St. Lawrence (6–4–2)	St. Lawrence (7–4–3)	Cornell (7–3–1)	Ohio State (11–3–4)	Ohio State (11–3–4)	Providence (13–5–5)	Ohio State (15–5–4)	Minnesota (17–8–2)	Minnesota (19–8–2)	Minnesota (20–8–3)	Minnesota (20–8–3)	Minnesota (20–10–3)	Minnesota (22–10–3)	Cornell (21–9–3)	Cornell (21–9–3)	7.
8.	Northeastern	Northeastern (0–1–1)	Colgate (2–0–0)	Minnesota Duluth (2–4–0)	St. Lawrence (tied) (2–2–2)	Cornell (1–1–0)	St. Lawrence (5–3–2)	Cornell (3–3–0)	Cornell (5–3–0)	St. Lawrence (7–4–3)	St. Lawrence (tied) (7–6–3)	Providence (11–5–4)	Ohio State (13–5–4)	Providence (14–6–5)	St. Lawrence (14–7–3)	St. Lawrence (14–9–3)	St. Lawrence (16–9–3)	St. Lawrence (17–9–4)	St. Lawrence (18–10–4)	St. Lawrence (20–10–4)	St. Lawrence (20–11–4)	St. Lawrence (tied) (20–11–4)	8.
9.	Quinnipiac	Robert Morris (0–0–0)	Minnesota (1–2–1)	Northeastern (2–3–1)	Cornell (0–0–0)	Providence (6–2–2)	Providence (6–3–2)	Robert Morris (9–1–2)	Robert Morris (9–1–2)	Robert Morris (10–2–2)	Providence (tied) (10–5–4)	Robert Morris (11–3–3)	Robert Morris (12–4–3)	Maine (15–6–3)	Maine (16–7–3)	Providence (14–9–6)	Maine (tied) (17–9–4)	Robert Morris (17–6–4)	Robert Morris (18–7–4)	Robert Morris (20–7–4)	Northeastern (19–16–3)	Northeastern (tied) (19–17–3)	9.
10.	Robert Morris	Colgate (0–0–0)	Robert Morris (2–0–0)	Cornell (0–0–0)	Robert Morris (5–1–0)	Robert Morris (5–1–2)	Robert Morris (7–1–2)	Providence (6–3–3)	Providence (8–3–3)	Providence (9–5–3)	Robert Morris (11–3–2)	St. Lawrence (9–6–3)	Maine (14–6–3)	St. Lawrence (12–7–3)	Providence (14–7–6)	Robert Morris (15–6–4)	Robert Morris (tied) (15–6–4)	Maine (17–10–5)	Providence (16–11–7)	Maine (19–13–5)	Robert Morris (21–8–4)	Mercyhurst (18–15–4)	10.
	Preseason Sep 18	Week 1 Oct 2	Week 2 Oct 9	Week 3 Oct 16	Week 4 Oct 23	Week 5 Oct 30	Week 6 Nov 6	Week 7 Nov 13	Week 8 Nov 20	Week 9 Nov 27	Week 10 Dec 4	Week 11 Dec 11	Week 12 Jan 8	Week 13 Jan 15	Week 14 Jan 22	Week 15 Jan 29	Week 16 Feb 5	Week 17 Feb 12	Week 18 Feb 19	Week 19 Feb 26	Week 20 Mar 5	Week 21 Mar 19	
		Dropped: Quinnipiac	Dropped: Cornell	Dropped: Robert Morris	Dropped: Minnesota Duluth	Dropped: Northeastern	None	None	None	None	None	None	Dropped: St. Lawrence	Dropped: Robert Morris	None	Dropped: Maine	Dropped: Providence	None	Dropped: Maine	Dropped: Providence	Dropped: Maine	Dropped: Robert Morris	

== USA Today ==
	Preseason Sep 19	Week 1 Oct 3	Week 2 Oct 10	Week 3 Oct 17	Week 4 Oct 24	Week 5 Oct 31	Week 6 Nov 7	Week 7 Nov 14	Week 8 Nov 21	Week 9 Nov 28	Week 10 Dec 5	Week 11 Dec 12	Week 12 Jan 9	Week 13 Jan 16	Week 14 Jan 23	Week 15 Jan 30	Week 16 Feb 6	Week 17 Feb 13	Week 18 Feb 20	Week 19 Feb 27	Week 20 Mar 6	Week 21 Mar 20	
1.	Clarkson (14)	Wisconsin (4–0–0) (15)	Wisconsin (6–0–0) (13)	Wisconsin (8–0–0) (13)	Wisconsin (10–0–0) (14)	Wisconsin (12–0–0) (19)	Wisconsin (14–0–0) (19)	Wisconsin (16–0–0) (19)	Wisconsin (16–0–0) (19)	Wisconsin (17–1–0) (18)	Wisconsin (19–1–0) (19)	Wisconsin (21–1–0) (19)	Wisconsin (21–1–0) (19)	Wisconsin (23–1–0) (19)	Wisconsin (24–1–0) (19)	Wisconsin (26–1–1) (19)	Clarkson (26–3–1) (11)	Wisconsin (27–3–2) (16)	Wisconsin (29–3–2) (19)	Wisconsin (29–3–2) (16)	Clarkson (33–4–1) (18)	Clarkson (36–4–1) (19)	1.
2.	Wisconsin (3)	Clarkson (1–0–1) (4)	Clarkson (3–0–1) (6)	Clarkson (5–0–1) (6)	Clarkson (7–0–1) (5)	Boston College (6–0–1)	Boston College (8–0–1)	Boston College (9–1–1)	Colgate (13–1–0)	Boston College (11–1–2) (1)	Boston College (13–1–3)	Boston College (15–1–3)	Boston College (18–1–3)	Clarkson (19–3–1)	Boston College (22–2–3)	Boston College (24–2–3)	Wisconsin (26–3–1) (7)	Clarkson (27–4–1) (2)	Clarkson (29–4–1)	Clarkson (31–4–1) (3)	Wisconsin (30–4–2) (1)	Colgate (34–6–1)	2.
3.	Minnesota (2)	Boston College (0–0–0)	Boston College (2–0–0)	Boston College (2–0–0)	Boston College (4–0–1)	Clarkson (8–1–1)	Clarkson (10–1–1)	Colgate (11–1–0)	Boston College (10–1–2)	Colgate (14–2–0)	Clarkson (14–3–1)	Clarkson (17–3–1)	Clarkson (17–3–1)	Boston College (19–2–3)	Clarkson (21–3–1)	Clarkson (23–3–1)	Boston College (24–2–3) (1)	Boston College (25–3–3)	Boston College (28–3–3)	Boston College (30–3–3)	Colgate (32–5–1)	Wisconsin (31–5–2)	3.
4.	Boston College	Minnesota Duluth (2–0–0)	St. Lawrence (1–0–1)	Ohio State (5–0–1)	Ohio State (7–0–1)	Ohio State (7–0–1)	Colgate (9–1–0)	Clarkson (11–2–1)	Clarkson (12–3–1)	Clarkson (12–3–1)	Colgate (15–3–0)	Colgate (15–3–1)	Colgate (17–3–1)	Colgate (19–3–1)	Colgate (22–3–1)	Colgate (23–4–1)	Colgate (25–4–1)	Colgate (27–4–1) (1)	Colgate (29–4–1)	Colgate (31–4–1)	Boston College (30–4–3)	Ohio State (24–11–4)	4.
5.	Minnesota Duluth	Minnesota (1–1–0)	Northeastern (2–1–1)	Colgate (4–0–0)	Colgate (6–0–0)	Colgate (7–1–0)	Minnesota (7–4–1)	Ohio State (9–2–1)	Ohio State (10–2–2)	Ohio State (tied) (11–3–2)	Cornell (8–4–1)	Cornell (8–4–1)	Minnesota (15–5–2)	Cornell (11–6–1)	Ohio State (17–5–4)	Cornell (13–7–2)	Ohio State (19–7–4)	Cornell (17–7–3)	Cornell (19–7–3)	Ohio State (23–9–4)	Minnesota (24–10–3)	Boston College (30–5–3)	5.
6.	St. Lawrence	St. Lawrence (1–0–1)	Minnesota Duluth (2–2–0)	St. Lawrence (2–0–2)	Minnesota (5–2–1)	Minnesota (5–4–1)	Ohio State (7–2–1)	Minnesota (9–4–1)	Minnesota (11–4–1)	Minnesota (tied) (13–4–1)	Minnesota (14–5–1)	Ohio State (11–3–4)	Cornell (8–6–1)	Minnesota (17–6–2)	Cornell (12–6–2)	Ohio State (17–7–4)	Cornell (14–7–3)	Ohio State (20–8–4)	Ohio State (21–9–4)	Cornell (21–8–3)	Ohio State (23–10–4)	Minnesota (24–11–3)	6.
7.	Cornell	Cornell (0–0–0)	Ohio State (3–0–1)	Minnesota (3–2–1)	Northeastern (4–3–1)	St. Lawrence (3–3–2)	Cornell (3–1–0)	St. Lawrence (6–4–2)	St. Lawrence (7–4–3)	Cornell (7–3–1)	Ohio State (11–3–4)	Minnesota (15–5–2)	Providence (11–5–4)	Ohio State (15–5–4)	Minnesota (17–8–2)	Minnesota (19–8–2)	Minnesota (20–8–3)	Minnesota (20–8–3)	Minnesota (20–10–3)	Minnesota (22–10–3)	Cornell (21–9–3)	Cornell (21–9–3)	7.
8.	Northeastern	Northeastern (0–1–1)	Minnesota (1–2–1) (T8)	Minnesota Duluth (2–4–0)	St. Lawrence (2–2–2)	Cornell (1–1–0)	St. Lawrence (5–3–2)	Cornell (3–3–0)	Cornell (5–3–0)	St. Lawrence (7–4–3)	St. Lawrence (7–6–3)	Robert Morris (11–3–3)	Ohio State (13–5–4)	Providence (14–6–5)	St. Lawrence (14–7–3)	St. Lawrence (14–9–3)	St. Lawrence (16–9–3)	St. Lawrence (17–9–4)	St. Lawrence (18–10–4)	St. Lawrence (20–10–4)	St. Lawrence (20–11–4)	Northeastern (19–17–3)	8.
9.	Quinnipiac	Robert Morris (0–0–0)	Colgate (2–0–0) (T8)	Northeastern (2–3–1)	Cornell (tied) (0–0–0)	Providence (6–2–2)	Robert Morris (7–1–2)	Robert Morris (9–1–2)	Robert Morris (9–1–2)	Robert Morris (10–2–2)	Robert Morris (11–3–2)	Providence (11–5–4)	Robert Morris (12–4–3)	Maine (15–6–3)	Maine (16–7–3)	Providence (14–9–6)	Maine (17–9–4)	Robert Morris (17–6–4)	Robert Morris (18–7–4)	Robert Morris (20–7–4)	Northeastern (19–16–3)	St. Lawrence (20–11–4)	9.
10.	Robert Morris	Colgate (0–0–0)	Cornell (0–0–0)	Robert Morris (3–1–0)	Robert Morris (tied) (5–1–0)	Robert Morris (5–1–2)	Providence (6–3–2)	Providence (6–3–3)	Providence (8–3–3)	Providence (9–5–3)	Providence (9–5–4)	St. Lawrence (9–6–3)	Maine (14–6–3)	Robert Morris (12–6–3)	Providence (14–7–6)	Robert Morris (15–6–4)	Robert Morris (15–6–4)	Maine (17–10–5)	Providence (16–11–7)	Maine (19–13–5)	Robert Morris (21–8–4)	Mercyhurst (18–15–4)	10.
	Preseason Sep 19	Week 1 Oct 3	Week 2 Oct 10	Week 3 Oct 17	Week 4 Oct 24	Week 5 Oct 31	Week 6 Nov 7	Week 7 Nov 14	Week 8 Nov 21	Week 9 Nov 28	Week 10 Dec 5	Week 11 Dec 12	Week 12 Jan 9	Week 13 Jan 16	Week 14 Jan 23	Week 15 Jan 30	Week 16 Feb 6	Week 17 Feb 13	Week 18 Feb 20	Week 19 Feb 27	Week 20 Mar 6	Week 21 Mar 20	
		Dropped: Quinnipiac	Dropped: Robert Morris	Dropped: Cornell	Dropped: Minnesota Duluth	Dropped: Northeastern	None	None	None	None	None	None	Dropped: St. Lawrence	None	Dropped: Robert Morris	Dropped: Maine	Dropped: Providence	None	Dropped: Maine	Dropped: Providence	Dropped: Maine	Dropped: Robert Morris	
