= 2017–18 Yale Bulldogs women's ice hockey season =

- Conference: ECAC Hockey
- Home ice: Ingalls Rink

Record
- Overall: 0-0-0
- Home: 0-0-0
- Road: 0-0-0
- Neutral: 0-0-0

Coaches and captains
- Head coach: Joakim Flygh
- Assistant coaches: Matt Woodard; Amanda Boulier
- Captain: Kaitlin Gately

The Yale Bulldogs represents Yale University in ECAC women's ice hockey during the 2017–18 NCAA Division I women's ice hockey season.

== Offseason ==
- June 26: Saroya Tinker won a Gold Medal in Ball Hockey with Team Canada. The World Championship Tournament was held in the Czech Republic.

=== Recruiting ===
| Player | Position | Nationality | Notes |
|---|---|---|---|
| Lucy Burton | Forward | United States | Played for the Minnesota Whitecaps |
| Tess Dettling | Forward | United States | Played for Chicago Mission |
| Rebecca Foggia | Forward | United States | Attended Shattuck-St. Mary's |
| Christina Kao | Defense | United States | Selected for USA Hockey National Development, 2015, 2016 |
| Gianna Meloni | Goaltender | United States | Played for the Washington Pride |
| Lauren Moriyama | Defense | Canada | Played with Toronto Jr. Aeros |
| Greta Skarzynski | Forward | United States | Teammate of Tess Dettling with Chicago Mission |

== 2015–16 Bulldogs ==
| No. | Nat. | Player | Class | Pos | Height | DoB | Hometown | Previous team |
|---|---|---|---|---|---|---|---|---|
| 2 | | Kara Drexler | Senior | D | 5' 4" (1.63 m) | | Manhattan Beach, California | Anaheim Lady Ducks |
| 3 | | Laura Anderson | Sophomore | F | 5' 9" (1.75 m) | | Lino Lakes, Minnesota | Hill-Murray HS |
| 4 | | Emily Monaghan | Senior | F | 5' 7" (1.7 m) | | Calgary, Alberta | Edge School |
| 5 | | Lucy Burton | Freshman | F | 5' 6" (1.68 m) | | Minneapolis, Minnesota | Minnesota Whitecaps |
| 6 | | Jordan Chancellor | Junior | F | 5' 5" (1.65 m) | | Ramsey, Minnesota | Minnesota Ice Cats |
| 7 | | Greta Skarzynski | Freshman | F | 5' 7" (1.7 m) | | Lake Forest, Illinois | Chicago Mission |
| 8 | | Eden Murray | Senior | F | 5' 4" (1.63 m) | | Medicine Hat, Alberta | Edge School |
| 9 | | Kate Tewksbury | Sophomore | D/F | 5' 8" (1.73 m) | | New York, New York | Mid Fairfield Connecticut Stars |
| 10 | | Kirsten Nergaard | Sophomore | F | 5' 6" (1.68 m) | | Stamford, Connecticut | Islanders Hockey Club |
| 11 | | Tess Dettling | Freshman | F | 5' 2" (1.57 m) | | Wilmette, Illinois | Chicago Mission |
| 12 | | Rebecca Foggia | Freshman | F | 5' 7" (1.7 m) | | Rumson, New Jersey | Shattuck-St. Mary's |
| 13 | | Lauren Moriyama | Freshman | F | 5' 5" (1.65 m) | | Toronto, Ontario | Toronto Jr. Aeros |
| 14 | | Mallory Souliotis | Senior | D | 5' 5" (1.65 m) | | Acton, Massachusetts | Assabet Valley |
| 15 | | Emma Vlasic | Junior | F | 5' 5" (1.65 m) | | Wilmette, Illinois | Chicago Young Americans |
| 16 | | Christina Kao | Freshman | D | 5' 2" (1.57 m) | | Huntington Beach, California | California Wave |
| 19 | | Courtney Pensavalle | Senior | F | 5' 9" (1.75 m) | | Winchester, Massachusetts | Team Pittsburgh |
| 20 | | Kaitlin Gately (C) | Senior | F | 5' 4" (1.63 m) | | Hingham, Massachusetts | Assabet Valley |
| 24 | | Grace Wickens | Senior | D | 5' 8" (1.73 m) | | Ham Lake, Minnesota | Toronto Jr. Aeros |
| 27 | | Sophie Veronneau | Sophomore | F | 5' 6" (1.68 m) | | Ottawa, Ontario | Ottawa Lady Senators |
| 31 | | Tera Hofmann | Sophomore | G | 5' 6" (1.68 m) | | Toronto, Ontario | Team Ontario U18 |
| 32 | | Gianna Meloni | Freshman | G | 5' 6" (1.68 m) | | Washington, D.C. | Washington Pride |
| 33 | | Kyra O'Brien | Junior | G | 5' 7" (1.7 m) | | Burlington, Ontario | Burlington Jr. Barracudas |
| 55 | | Julia Yetman | Junior | D | 5' 6" (1.68 m) | | Pierrefonds, Quebec | Team Quebec U18 |
| 71 | | Saroya Tinker | Sophomore | D | 5' 9" (1.75 m) | | Oshawa, Ontario | Team Canada U18 |

== Standings ==
2017–18 ECAC Hockey standings
| | Conference | | | | | | | Overall | | | | | |
| | GP | W | L | T | PTS | GF | GA | GP | W | L | T | GF | GA |
|---|---|---|---|---|---|---|---|---|---|---|---|---|---|
| #1 Clarkson†* | 22 | 19 | 3 | 0 | 38 | 90 | 29 | 41 | 36 | 4 | 1 | 158 | 48 |
| #2 Colgate† | 22 | 19 | 3 | 0 | 38 | 80 | 35 | 41 | 34 | 6 | 1 | 150 | 70 |
| #7 Cornell | 22 | 15 | 5 | 2 | 32 | 66 | 42 | 33 | 21 | 9 | 3 | 100 | 65 |
| #8 St. Lawrence | 22 | 14 | 6 | 2 | 30 | 67 | 40 | 35 | 20 | 11 | 4 | 96 | 73 |
| Quinnipiac | 22 | 12 | 9 | 1 | 25 | 41 | 40 | 36 | 16 | 17 | 3 | 65 | 71 |
| Princeton | 22 | 11 | 0 | 1 | 23 | 60 | 43 | 32 | 14 | 14 | 4 | 79 | 64 |
| Harvard | 22 | 10 | 10 | 2 | 22 | 52 | 48 | 31 | 13 | 16 | 2 | 31 | 79 |
| Yale | 22 | 8 | 12 | 2 | 18 | 43 | 53 | 31 | 10 | 17 | 4 | 59 | 83 |
| RPI | 22 | 6 | 13 | 3 | 15 | 35 | 50 | 34 | 9 | 19 | 6 | 54 | 78 |
| Union | 22 | 5 | 15 | 2 | 12 | 45 | 78 | 34 | 7 | 22 | 5 | 65 | 121 |
| Dartmouth | 22 | 3 | 16 | 3 | 9 | 25 | 77 | 27 | 5 | 19 | 3 | 37 | 98 |
| Brown | 22 | 1 | 21 | 0 | 2 | 25 | 77 | 29 | 2 | 27 | 0 | 46 | 134 |
Championship: March 10, 2018 † indicates conference regular season champion; * indicates conference tournament champion Rankings: USCHO.com

== Schedule ==
| Date | Opponent^{#} | Rank^{#} | Site | Decision | Result | Record |
Regular Season
| October 20 | at RIT* | | Gene Polisseni Center • Rochester, NY | | 0–0–0 | |
| October 21 | at RIT* | | Gene Polisseni Center • Rochester, NY | | | |
| October 27 | at Rensselaer | | Houston Field House • Troy, NY | | | |
| October 28 | at Union | | Achilles Center • Schenectady, NY | | | |
| November 3 | Clarkson | | Ingalls Rink • New Haven, CT | | | |
| November 4 | St. Lawrence | | Ingalls Rink • New Haven, CT | | | |
| November 10 | at Dartmouth | | Thompson Arena • Hanover, NH | | | |
| November 11 | at Harvard | | Bright-Landry Hockey Center • Allston, MA | | | |
| November 17 | Colgate | | Ingalls Rink • New Haven, CT | | | |
| November 18 | Cornell | | Ingalls Rink • New Haven, CT | | | |
| November 24 | vs. Quinnipiac* | | Freitas Ice Forum • Storrs, CT (Nutmeg Classic, Opening Round) | | | |
| November 25 | vs. TBD* | | Freitas Ice Forum • Storrs, CT (Nutmeg Classic) | | | |
| December 1 | Union | | Ingalls Rink • New Haven, CT | | | |
| December 2 | Rensselaer | | Ingalls Rink • New Haven, CT | | | |
| December 7 | Boston University | | Ingalls Rink • New Haven, CT | | | |
| December 10 | at [[{{{school}}}|New Hampshire]]* | | Whittemore Center • Durham, NH | | | |
| January 2, 2018 | Quinnipiac* | | Ingalls Rink • New Haven, CT | | | |
| January 12 | at Quinnipiac | | High Point Solutions Arena • Hamden, CT | | | |
| January 13 | at Princeton | | Hobey Baker Memorial Rink • Princeton, NJ | | | |
| January 18 | Brown | | Ingalls Rink • New Haven, CT | | | |
| January 20 | at Brown | | Meehan Auditorium • Providence, RI | | | |
| January 26 | Harvard | | Ingalls Rink • New Haven, CT | | | |
| January 27 | Dartmouth | | Ingalls Rink • New Haven, CT | | | |
| February 2 | at St. Lawrence | | Appleton Arena • Canton, NY | | | |
| February 3 | at Clarkson | | Cheel Arena • Potsdam, NY | | | |
| February 9 | at Cornell | | Lynah Rink • Ithaca, NY | | | |
| February 10 | at Colgate | | Class of 1965 Arena • Hamilton, NY | | | |
| February 16 | Princeton | | Ingalls Rink • New Haven, CT | | | |
| February 17 | Quinnipiac | | Ingalls Rink • New Haven, CT | | | |
*Non-conference game. ^{#}Rankings from USCHO.com Poll.

== Awards and honors ==
- Mallory Souliotis, 2017-18 First Team All-Ivy
- Greta Skarzynski, 2017-18 Second Team All-Ivy
- Gianna Meloni, 2017-18 Honorable Mention All-Ivy
