= 2017–18 Clarkson Golden Knights women's ice hockey season =

NCAA National Collegiate Champions ECAC Hockey Regular Season co-champions ECAC Hockey Tournament Champions NCAA Championship Game, W 2–1 ^{OT} vs. Colgate
- Conference: T–1st ECAC
- Home ice: Cheel Arena

Rankings
- USCHO.com: #1
- USA Today/USA Hockey Magazine: #1

Record
- Overall: 36–4–1
- Home: 19–2–0
- Road: 15–2–1
- Neutral: 2–0–0

Coaches and captains
- Head coach: Matt Desrosiers
- Assistant coaches: Britni Smith; Tony Maci
- Captain: Savannah Harmon
- Alternate captain(s): Lauren Lefler; Shea Tiley; Amanda Titus; Cassidy Vinkle

The Clarkson Golden Knights women's ice hockey program represented Clarkson University during the 2017–18 NCAA Division I women's ice hockey season. The Golden Knights entered the season as the defending national champions as well as the ECAC regular season and tournament champions. They also entered the season as the top-ranked team in both the USCHO.com and the USA Today/USA Hockey Magazine polls for the first time.

In their most successful season to date, the Golden Knights successfully defended all three titles. After splitting the ECAC regular season title with Colgate, the Golden Knights won the ECAC title over said Colgate team 3–0. They followed up their conference championship by advancing to their third NCAA title game, where they once again beat Colgate 2–1 in overtime to win the program's third national title. In addition to the NCAA championship game, the Golden Knights won both of their other NCAA tournament games in overtime, becoming the first team to win all three NCAA tournament games in overtime en route to a title.

== Offseason ==
=== Recruiting ===
Player	Position	Nationality	Notes
Michaela Boyle	Forward	United States	Played for Reading Memorial High School
Kia Castonguay	Goaltender	United States	Played for Boston Shamrocks
Elizabeth Giguere	Forward	Canada	Played for Limoilou Titans; Winner of silver medal at 2017 Nations Cup
Meaghan Hector	Defense	Canada	Played for Oakville Jr. Hornets; Winner of silver medal at 2017 IIHF U18 Women's Worlds
Avery Mitchell	Defense	Canada	Played for Toronto Jr. Aeros; Winner of silver medal at 2017 IIHF U18 Women's Worlds
Kristy Pidgeon	Forward	Canada	Played for Nepean Jr. Wildcats; Member of 2015 and 2016 U18 Team Ontario
Tia Stoddard	Forward	United States	Played for Nepean Jr. Wildcats

== Roster ==
No.	Nat.	Player	Class	Pos	Height	DoB	Hometown	Previous team
4		Avery Mitchell	Freshman	D	5' 4" (1.63 m)	1999-08-30	Pickering, Ontario	Toronto Jr. Aeros
7		Elizabeth Giguere	Freshman	F	5' 10" (1.78 m)	1997-05-08	Quebec, Quebec	Limoilou Titans
8		Lauren Lefler (A)	Senior	F	5' 8" (1.73 m)	1996-06-26	Windsor, Ontario	Bluewater Jr. Hawks
9		Tia Stoddard	Freshman	F	5' 1" (1.55 m)	1998-06-09	La Mesa, California	Nepean Jr. Wildcats
10		Michaela Pejzlova	Sophomore	F	5' 7" (1.7 m)	1997-04-06	Pardubice, Czech Republic	Stanstead Spartans
11		Ella Shelton	Sophomore	D	5' 8" (1.73 m)	1998-01-19	Ingersoll, Ontario	London Devilettes
12		Katherine Beaumier	Sophomore	F	5' 4" (1.63 m)	1998-02-03	Richland, Washington	Anaheim Lady Ducks
14		Savannah Harmon (C)	Senior	D	5' 3" (1.6 m)	1995-10-27	Downers Grove, Illinois	Boston Shamrocks
15		Amanda Titus (A)	Senior	F	5' 6" (1.68 m)	1996-10-06	Stittsville, Ontario	Ottawa Jr. Senators
16		Michaela Boyle	Freshman	F	5' 3" (1.6 m)	1999-07-16	Reading, Massachusetts	Reading Memorial High School
17		Taylor Turnquist	Sophomore	D	5' 5" (1.65 m)	1997-08-14	Blaine, Minnesota	Spring Lake Park H.S.
18		Meaghan Hector	Freshman	D	5' 6" (1.68 m)	1999-03-24	Georgetown, Ontario	Oakville Jr. Hornets
19		Loren Gabel	Junior	F	5' 4" (1.63 m)	1997-07-24	Kitchener, Ontario	Oakville Jr. Hornets
20		Kristy Pidgeon	Freshman	F	5' 10" (1.78 m)	1999-12-16	Ingleside, Ontario	Nepean Jr. Wildcats
21		Emma Keenan	Junior	D	5' 7" (1.7 m)	1997-11-26	Calgary, Alberta	Okanagan Hockey Academy
22		Cassidy Vinkle (A)	Junior	F	5' 8" (1.73 m)	1997-08-28	Belleville, Ontario	Whitby Jr. Wolves
24		Katelyn Fournier	Senior	F	5' 7" (1.7 m)	1996-03-25	Ottawa, Ontario	Ottawa Jr. Senators
25		Rhyen McGill	Junior	F	5' 8" (1.73 m)	1997-10-28	Whitby, Ontario	Whitby Jr. Wolves
26		Kelly Mariani	Junior	F	5' 3" (1.6 m)	1997-03-03	Mississauga, Ontario	Mississauga Jr. Chiefs
28		Josiane Pozzebon	Junior	D	5' 5" (1.65 m)	1997-03-25	Bourget, Ontario	Nepean Jr. Wildcats
29		Kia Castonguay	Freshman	G	5' 5" (1.65 m)	1998-10-24	Ipswich, Massachusetts	Boston Shamrocks
31		Jenna Brenneman	Sophomore	G	5' 8" (1.73 m)	1998-07-13	Eagan, Minnesota	Breck H.S.
35		Shea Tiley (A)	Senior	G	5' 10" (1.78 m)	1996-12-02	Owen Sound, Ontario	Kitchener-Waterloo Rangers

== Standings ==
2017–18 ECAC Hockey standings
	Conference							Overall					
	GP	W	L	T	PTS	GF	GA	GP	W	L	T	GF	GA
#1 Clarkson†*	22	19	3	0	38	90	29	41	36	4	1	158	48
#2 Colgate†	22	19	3	0	38	80	35	41	34	6	1	150	70
#7 Cornell	22	15	5	2	32	66	42	33	21	9	3	100	65
#8 St. Lawrence	22	14	6	2	30	67	40	35	20	11	4	96	73
Quinnipiac	22	12	9	1	25	41	40	36	16	17	3	65	71
Princeton	22	11	0	1	23	60	43	32	14	14	4	79	64
Harvard	22	10	10	2	22	52	48	31	13	16	2	31	79
Yale	22	8	12	2	18	43	53	31	10	17	4	59	83
RPI	22	6	13	3	15	35	50	34	9	19	6	54	78
Union	22	5	15	2	12	45	78	34	7	22	5	65	121
Dartmouth	22	3	16	3	9	25	77	27	5	19	3	37	98
Brown	22	1	21	0	2	25	77	29	2	27	0	46	134
Championship: March 10, 2018 † indicates conference regular season champion; * indicates conference tournament champion Rankings: USCHO.com

== Schedule ==
Date	Opponent^{#}	Rank^{#}	Site	Decision	Result	Record
Regular Season
September 23	Guelph*	#1	Cheel Arena • Potsdam, NY (exhibition)	Kia Castonguay	W 5–3	0–0–0
September 29	at #8 Northeastern*	#1	Matthews Arena • Boston, MA	Shea Tiley	T 1–1 ^{OT}	0–0–1
September 30	at #8 Northeastern*	#1	Matthews Arena • Boston, MA	Shea Tiley	W 5–1	1–0–1
October 6	Bemidji State*	#2	Cheel Arena • Potsdam, NY	Shea Tiley	W 2–0	2–0–1
October 7	Bemidji State*	#2	Cheel Arena • Potsdam, NY	Shea Tiley	W 5–4	3–0–1
October 13	at Penn State*	#2	Pegula Ice Arena • University Park, PA	Shea Tiley	W 2–0	4–0–1
October 14	at Penn State*	#2	Pegula Ice Arena • University Park, PA	Shea Tiley	W 2–0	5–0–1
October 20	at #6 St. Lawrence*	#2	Appleton Arena • Canton, NY	Shea Tiley	W 4–2	6–0–1
October 21	#6 St. Lawrence*	#2	Cheel Arena • Potsdam, NY	Shea Tiley	W 6–1	7–0–1
October 27	#5 Colgate	#2	Cheel Arena • Potsdam, NY	Shea Tiley	L 3–4 ^{OT}	7–1–1 (0–1–0)
October 28	#9 Cornell	#2	Cheel Arena • Potsdam, NY	Shea Tiley	W 6–0	8–1–1 (1–1–0)
November 3	at Yale	#3	Ingalls Rink • New Haven, CT	Shea Tiley	W 4–0	9–1–1 (2–1–0)
November 4	at Brown	#3	Meehan Auditorium • Providence, RI	Shea Tiley	W 11–1	10–1–1 (3–1–0)
November 10	at Vermont*	#3	Gutterson Fieldhouse • Burlington, VT	Shea Tiley	L 2–3	10–2–1
November 11	Vermont*	#3	Cheel Arena • Potsdam, NY	Shea Tiley	W 4–0	11–2–1
November 17	Quinnipiac	#4	Cheel Arena • Potsdam, NY	Shea Tiley	L 2–3 ^{OT}	11–3–1 (3–2–0)
November 18	Princeton	#4	Cheel Arena • Potsdam, NY	Shea Tiley	W 4–0	12–3–1 (4–2–0)
November 30	#8 St. Lawrence	#4	Cheel Arena • Potsdam, NY	Shea Tiley	W 2–1	13–3–1 (5–2–0)
December 2	at #8 St. Lawrence	#4	Appleton Arena • Canton, NY	Shea Tiley	W 4–1	14–3–1 (6–2–0)
December 5	at Syracuse*	#3	Tennity Ice Skating Pavilion • Syracuse, NY	Shea Tiley	W 5–0	15–3–1
December 8	at Union	#3	Achilles Rink • Schenectady, NY	Shea Tiley	W 5–1	16–3–1 (7–2–0)
December 9	at RPI	#3	Houston Field House • Troy, NY	Shea Tiley	W 4–1	17–3–1 (8–2–0)
January 12	RPI	#3	Cheel Arena • Potsdam, NY	Shea Tiley	W 3–2 ^{OT}	18–3–1 (9–2–0)
January 13	Union	#3	Cheel Arena • Potsdam, NY	Shea Tiley	W 7–3	19–3–1 (10–2–0)
January 19	at Harvard	#2	Bright-Landry Hockey Center • Allston, MA	Shea Tiley	W 3–1	20–3–1 (11–2–0)
January 20	at Dartmouth	#2	Thompson Arena • Hanover, NH	Shea Tiley	W 8–1	21–3–1 (12–2–0)
January 26	at #6 Cornell	#3	Lynah Rink • Ithaca, NY	Shea Tiley	W 4–3 ^{OT}	22–3–1 (13–2–0)
January 27	at #2 Colgate	#3	Class of 1965 Arena • Hamilton, NY	Shea Tiley	W 5–3	23–3–1 (14–2–0)
January 30	Syracuse*	#2	Cheel Arena • Potsdam, NY	Shea Tiley	W 4–1	24–3–1
February 2	Brown	#2	Cheel Arena • Potsdam, NY	Jenna Brenneman	W 4–0	25–3–1 (15–2–0)
February 3	Yale	#2	Cheel Arena • Potsdam, NY	Shea Tiley	W 2–1	26–3–1 (16–2–0)
February 9	at Princeton	#1	Hobey Baker Memorial Rink • Princeton, NJ	Shea Tiley	L 0–2	26–4–1 (16–3–0)
February 10	at Quinnipiac	#1	TD Bank Sports Center • Hamden, CT	Shea Tiley	W 2–0	27–4–1 (17–3–0)
February 16	Dartmouth	#2	Cheel Arena • Potsdam, NY	Shea Tiley	W 4–0	28–4–1 (18–3–0)
February 17	Harvard	#2	Cheel Arena • Potsdam, NY	Shea Tiley	W 3–1	29–4–1 (18–3–0)
ECAC Hockey Tournament
February 23	Yale*	#2	Cheel Arena • Potsdam, NY (Quarterfinals Game 1)	Shea Tiley	W 10–1	30–4–1
February 24	Yale*	#2	Cheel Arena • Potsdam, NY (Quarterfinals Game 2)	Shea Tiley	W 4–1	31–4–1
March 3	#8 St. Lawrence*	#2	Cheel Arena • Potsdam, NY (Semifinals)	Shea Tiley	W 4–2	32–4–1
March 4	#4 Colgate*	#2	Cheel Arena • Potsdam, NY (Championship)	Shea Tiley	W 3–0	33–4–1
NCAA Tournament
March 10	Merchyhurst*	#1	Cheel Arena • Potsdam, NY (Quarterfinals)	Shea Tiley	W 2–1 ^{OT}	34–4–1
March 16	vs. #6 Ohio State*	#1	Ridder Arena • Minneapolis, MN (Semifinals)	Shea Tiley	W 1–0 ^{OT}	35–4–1
March 19	vs. #3 Colgate*	#1	Ridder Arena • Minneapolis, MN (Championship)	Shea Tiley	W 2–1 ^{OT}	36–4–1
*Non-conference game. ^{#}Rankings from USCHO.com Poll.

== Awards and honors ==
- Jenna Brenneman – ECAC Hockey weekly Honor Roll (2/5)
- Loren Gabel – Patty Kazmaier Award finalist, NCAA All-Tournament Team, First Team AHCA All-American, First Team All-USCHO.com, ECAC Hockey Player of the Year, ECAC Hockey Best Forward, ECAC Hockey All-Tournament Team, ECAC Hockey First Team All-Star, HCA Player of the Month (January), ECAC Hockey Player of the Month (October, December, January), NCAA First Star of the Week (1/23, 2/27) ECAC Hockey Player of the Week (10/2, 10/31, 12/12, 1/23, 1/30, 2/26), ECAC Hockey weekly Honor Roll (10/16, 1/16, 2/5, 2/20)
- Elizabeth Giguere – NCAA All-Tournament Team, Second Team ACHA All-America, Second Team All-USCHO.com, ECAC Hockey Rookie of the Year, ECAC Hockey First Team All-Star, ECAC Hockey All-Rookie Team, HCA Rookie of the Month (December, March), ECAC Hockey Rookie of the Month (October, December, January), ECAC Hockey Player of the Week (10/24), ECAC Hockey Rookie of the Week (10/2, 10/9, 10/24, 11/7, 11/14, 12/5, 12/12, 1/23, 1/30, 2/5, 3/6), ECAC Hockey weekly Honor Roll (10/16, 1/16, 2/12, 2/20)
- Savannah Harmon – Patty Kazmaier Award Top 10, NCAA All-Tournament Team, First Team AHCA All-America, First Team All-USCHO.com, ECAC Hockey Best Defenseman, ECAC Hockey All-Tournament Team, ECAC Hockey First Team All-Star, ECAC Hockey weekly Honor Roll (10/9, 11/7, 12/5)
- Rhyen McGill – ECAC Hockey weekly Honor Roll (2/12)
- Michaela Pejzlova – ECAC Hockey Tournament Most Outstanding Player, ECAC Hockey All-Tournament Team, ECAC Hockey Second Team All-Star, ECAC Hockey Player of the Week (3/6), ECAC Hockey weekly Honor Roll (11/14, 11/21)
- Kristy Pidgeon – ECAC Hockey weekly Honor Roll (11/21)
- Ella Shelton – ECAC Hockey All-Tournament Team, ECAC Hockey Second Team All-Star
- Shea Tiley — Patty Kazmaier Award Top 10, NCAA Tournament Most Outstanding Player, NCAA All-Tournament Team, First Team AHCA All-American, First Team All-USCHO.com, ECAC Hockey Goaltender of the Year, ECAC Hockey All-Tournament Team, ECAC Hockey First Team All-Star, HCA Player of the Month (December, March), ECAC Hockey Goaltender of the Month (October, December, February), NCAA Second Star of the Week (12/12), NCAA Third Star of the Week (12/5), ECAC Hockey Goaltender of the Week (10/2, 10/24, 12/5, 12/12, 3/6), ECAC Hockey weekly Honor Roll (10/9, 10/16, 11/7, 11/14, 11/21, 1/16, 1/23, 1/30, 2/12, 2/20)
- Matt Desrosiers – ECAC Hockey Coach of the Year
