= 2017–18 Cornell Big Red women's ice hockey season =

- Conference: ECAC Hockey
- Home ice: Lynah Rink

Rankings
- USA Today/USA Hockey Magazine: 7th
- USCHO.com: 7th

Record
- Overall: 0–0–0
- Home: 0–0–0
- Road: 0–0–0

Coaches and captains
- Head coach: Doug Derraugh
- Assistant coaches: Edith Racine; Dean Jackson

The Cornell Big Red represented Cornell University in ECAC women's ice hockey during the 2017–18 NCAA Division I women's ice hockey season.

In the offseason, Cornell hired Dean Jackson as an assistant coach, who had led nearby Elmira College to a Division III national championship in 2013, and had most recently been interim head coach for Penn State.

Canadian Cornell skaters were well represented in international play over the spring and summer. During the IIHF World Championships in Plymouth, Michigan, four Big Red alumni, Laura Fortino (2013), Lauriane Rougeau (2013), Brianne Jenner (2015) and Rebecca Johnston (2012), skated for the silver-medal Canadians. In May, Team Canada named 28 players to the centralization roster, including five alumni: Fortino, Rogeau, Jenner, Johnston and Jillian Saulnier (2015), and one current player, Micah Hart. Twenty-three of the 28 will be named to the roster for the 2018 Olympics.

Following a 2017 NCAA Tournament appearance, the Big Red began the season ranked seventh in both national polls.

== Recruiting ==
Player	Position	Nationality	Notes
Lindsay Browning	Goaltender	United States	Minded the net for the Buffalo Bisons
Devon Facchinato	Defense	Canada	Chosen for Team Ontario
Finley Frechette	Forward	United States	Attended St. Paul's School
Madlynne Mills	Forward	United States	Attended Shattuck-St. Mary's
Kendra Nealy	Defense	United States	Blueliner for the Chicago Mission
Joie Phelps	Forward	United States	Named to Minnesota All-State team
Willow Slobodzian	Defense	Canada	Member of Team Canada U18

== 2017–18 roster ==
No.	Nat.	Player	Class	Pos	Height	DoB	Hometown	Previous team
1		Marlène Boissonnault	Junior	G	5' 10" (1.78 m)		Dundee, New Brunswick	Team Canada U18
2		Erin O'Connor	Senior	D	5' 10" (1.78 m)		Evanston, Illinois	Chicago Young Americans
4		Kendra Nealey	Freshman	D	5' 11" (1.8 m)		Chicago, Illinois	Chicago Mission
5		Grace Graham	Sophomore	F	5' 8" (1.73 m)		Island View, New Brunswick	Team Canada U18
6		Joie Phelps	Freshman	F	5' 7" (1.7 m)		Eagan, Minnesota	Visitation HS
9		Devon Facchinato	Freshman	D	5' 10" (1.78 m)		Windsor, Ontario	Team Ontario
10		Brianna Veerman	Senior	F	5' 5" (1.65 m)		Burlington, Ontario	Aurora Jr. Panthers
12		Hanna Mutschelknaus	Sophomore	F	5' 6" (1.68 m)		Brandon, South Dakota	St. Louis AAA Blues
13		Valérie Audet	Sophomore	F	5' 4" (1.63 m)		St. Bruno, Quebec	Team Canada U18
14		Jaime Bourbonnais	Sophomore	D	5' 7" (1.7 m)		Mississauga, Ontario	Oakville Jr. Hornets
15		Pippy Gerace	Junior	F	5' 2" (1.57 m)		Jamestown, New York	Etobicoke Jr. Dolphins
17		Lenka Serdar	Junior	F	5' 8" (1.73 m)		Lexington, Massachusetts	North American Hockey Academy
18		Paige Lewis	Sophomore	F	5' 5" (1.65 m)		New Canaan, Connecticut	North American Hockey Academy
19		Diana Buckley	Junior	F	5' 8" (1.73 m)		Woodbridge, Virginia	Washindton Pride
20		Kristin O'Neill	Sophomore	F	5' 4" (1.63 m)		Oakville, Ontario	Team Canada U18
21		Amy Curlew	Sophomore	F	5' 3" (1.6 m)		Goose Bay, Labrador	Oakville Jr. Hornets
22		Madlynne Mills	Freshman	F	5' 4" (1.63 m)		Sewickley, Pennsylvania	Shattuck-St. Mary's
23		Finley Freshette	Freshman	F	5' 5" (1.65 m)		Weston, Massachusetts	St. Paul's School
24		Sarah Knee	Senior	D	6' 1" (1.85 m)		Toronto, Ontario	Toronto Jr. Aeros
27		Willow Slobodzian	Freshman	D	5' 6" (1.68 m)		Clavet, Saskatchewan	Team Canada U18
29		Lindsay Browning	Freshman	G	5' 3" (1.6 m)		Penfield, New York	Buffalo Bison

== Standings ==
2017–18 ECAC Hockey standings
	Conference							Overall					
	GP	W	L	T	PTS	GF	GA	GP	W	L	T	GF	GA
#1 Clarkson†*	22	19	3	0	38	90	29	41	36	4	1	158	48
#2 Colgate†	22	19	3	0	38	80	35	41	34	6	1	150	70
#7 Cornell	22	15	5	2	32	66	42	33	21	9	3	100	65
#8 St. Lawrence	22	14	6	2	30	67	40	35	20	11	4	96	73
Quinnipiac	22	12	9	1	25	41	40	36	16	17	3	65	71
Princeton	22	11	0	1	23	60	43	32	14	14	4	79	64
Harvard	22	10	10	2	22	52	48	31	13	16	2	31	79
Yale	22	8	12	2	18	43	53	31	10	17	4	59	83
RPI	22	6	13	3	15	35	50	34	9	19	6	54	78
Union	22	5	15	2	12	45	78	34	7	22	5	65	121
Dartmouth	22	3	16	3	9	25	77	27	5	19	3	37	98
Brown	22	1	21	0	2	25	77	29	2	27	0	46	134
Championship: March 10, 2018 † indicates conference regular season champion; * indicates conference tournament champion Rankings: USCHO.com

== 2017–18 schedule ==
Date	Opponent^{#}	Rank^{#}	Site	Decision	Result	Record
Regular season
October 27	at St. Lawrence		Appleton Arena • Canton, NY		0–0–0 (0–0–0)	
October 28	at Clarkson		Cheel Arena • Potsdam, NY			
November 3	Quinnipiac		Lynah Rink • Ithaca, NY			
November 4	Princeton		Lynah Rink • Ithaca, NY			
November 10	Wisconsin*		Lynah Rink • Ithaca, NY			
November 11	Wisconsin*		Lynah Rink • Ithaca, NY			
November 17	at Brown		Meehan Auditorium • Providence, RI			
November 18	at Yale		Ingalls Rink • New Haven, CT			
November 21	Penn State*		Lynah Rink • Ithaca, NY			
November 25	at Providence*		Schneider Arena • Providence, RI			
November 26	at Providence*		Schneider Arena • Providence, RI			
December 1	Colgate		Lynah Rink • Ithaca, NY			
December 2	at Colgate		Class of 1965 Arena • Hamilton, NY			
January 5, 2018	at Princeton		Hobey Baker Memorial Rink • Princeton, NJ			
January 6	at Quinnipiac		High Point Solutions Arena • Hamden, CT			
January 9	at Syracuse*		Tennity Ice Skating Pavilion • Syracuse, NY			
January 12	Dartmouth		Lynah Rink • Ithaca, NY			
January 13	Harvard		Lynah Rink • Ithaca, NY			
January 19	Rensselaer		Lynah Rink • Ithaca, NY			
January 20	Union		Lynah Rink • Ithaca, NY			
January 26	Clarkson		Lynah Rink • Ithaca, NY			
January 27	St. Lawrence		Lynah Rink • Ithaca, NY			
February 2	at Harvard		Bright-Landry Hockey Center • Allston, MA			
February 3	at Dartmouth		Thompson Arena • Hanover, NH			
February 6	Syracuse*		Lynah Rink • Ithaca, NY			
February 9	Yale		Lynah Rink • Ithaca, NY			
February 10	Brown		Lynah Rink • Ithaca, NY			
February 16	at Union		Achilles Center • Schenectady, NY			
February 17	at Rensselaer		Houston Field House • Troy, NY			
*Non-conference game. ^{#}Rankings from USCHO.com Poll.

== Awards and honors ==
- Kristin O'Neill, Ivy League Player of the Year
- Maddie Mills, Ivy League Rookie of the Year
- Doug Derraugh, Ivy League Coach of the Year
- Kristin O'Neill, First Team All-Ivy
- Maddie Mills, First Team All-Ivy
- Jaime Bourbonnais, First Team All-Ivy
- Marlène Boissonnault, First Team All-Ivy
- Lenka Serdar, Honorable Mention All-Ivy
