= 2017–18 Dartmouth Big Green women's ice hockey season =

- Conference: ECAC Hockey
- Home ice: Thompson Arena

Record
- Overall: 0-0-0
- Home: 0-0-0
- Road: 0-0-0

Coaches and captains
- Head coach: Joe Marsh interim
- Assistant coaches: Chris Cobb; Courtney Sheary

The Dartmouth Big Green represent Dartmouth College in ECAC women's ice hockey during the 2017–18 NCAA Division I women's ice hockey season.

== Offseason ==
- May 10: 2016-17 Head Coach Laura Schuler was named head coach of the 2018 Canadian Olympic Team
- June 30: Former St. Lawrence men's coach will act as the interim head coach for the 2017-18 season. Marsh led his team to the NCAA Tournament 8 times in his 27 years, including the 1988 Championship game.

=== Recruiting ===
Player	Position	Nationality	Notes
Megan Cornell	Defense	United States	Attended Benilde-St. Margaret's
Jennifer Costa	Forward	United States	Played for Massachusetts Spitfires
Katerina Dajia	Defense	Canada	Blueliner for Durham West Jr. Lightning
Linda Essery	Forward	United States	Attended Loomis Chaffee
Taylor Matherson	Defense	United States	Teammate of Jennifer Costa
Emily McLaughlin	Forward	United States	Hockey and Lacrosse standout from Eden Prairie, Minnesota
Kayla Wormsbecher	Goaltender	Canada	Minded the net for the Toronto J. Aeros

== 2017–18 Big Green ==
No.	Nat.	Player	Class	Pos	Height	DoB	Hometown	Previous team
3		Jennifer Costa	Freshman	F			Pawtucket, Rhode Island	Mass Spitfires
4		Caroline Shaunessy	Junior	D	5' 9" (1.75 m)		Duxbury, Massachusetts	Bay State Breakers
6		Bailee Brekke	Sophomore	D	5' 7" (1.7 m)		Oxford, Ohio	Culver Academies
7		Christina Rombaut	Sophomore	F	5' 6" (1.68 m)		Rothesay, New Brunswick	Team Atlantic U-18
8		Megan Cornell	Freshman	D			Bloomington, Minnesota	Benilde-St. Margaret's
9		Taylor Matherson	Freshman	D			Walpole, Massachusetts	Mass Spitfires
10		Morgan Turner	Senior	F	5' 8" (1.73 m)		Chicago, Illinois	Chicago Mission
11		Alyssa Baker	Junior	F	5' 6" (1.68 m)		Ottawa, Ontario	Nepean Jr. Wildcats
12		Emily McLaughlin	Freshman	F	5' 7" (1.7 m)		Eden Prairie, Minnesota	Eden Prairie HS
13		Cecilia Lopez	Sophomore	F	5' 8" (1.73 m)		Winnipeg, Manitoba	St. Mary’s Academy Prep
14		Sabrina Huett	Sophomore	F	5' 9" (1.75 m)		Plainfield, New Hampshire	Choate-Rosemary Hall
16		Hailey Noronha	Senior	D	5' 5" (1.65 m)		Newmarket, Ontario	Whitby Jr. Wolves
18		Sydney Hill	Freshman	D	5' 5" (1.65 m)		Redvers, Saskatchewan	Team Saskatchewan U18
19		Linda Essery	Freshman	F			Rockfall, Connecticut	Mid Fairfield Connecticut Stars
20		Sara López-Wheeler	Sophomore	D	5' 11" (1.8 m)		Cambridge, Massachusetts	Mid Fairfield Connecticut Stars
21		Brooke Ahbe	Senior	F	5' 8" (1.73 m)		Centennial, Colorado	Shattuck-St. Mary's
22		Kate Landers	Junior	F	5' 5" (1.65 m)		Chicago, Illinois	Chicago Mission
24		Katerina Dajia	Freshman	D			Aurora, Ontario	Durham West
27		Rose Falzone	Sophomore	F	5' 4" (1.63 m)		Nobleton, Ontario	Mississauga Jr. Chiefs
29		Shannon Ropp	Junior	G	5' 3" (1.6 m)		West Bloomfield, Michigan	Honeybaked U19
30		Kayla Wormsbecher	Freshman	G	5' 4" (1.63 m)		Mississauga, Ontario	Toronto Jr. Aeros
31		Christie Honor	Junior	G	5' 8" (1.73 m)		Mississauga, Ontario	Etobicoke Jr. Dolphins

== Standings ==
2017–18 ECAC Hockey standings
	Conference							Overall					
	GP	W	L	T	PTS	GF	GA	GP	W	L	T	GF	GA
#1 Clarkson†*	22	19	3	0	38	90	29	41	36	4	1	158	48
#2 Colgate†	22	19	3	0	38	80	35	41	34	6	1	150	70
#7 Cornell	22	15	5	2	32	66	42	33	21	9	3	100	65
#8 St. Lawrence	22	14	6	2	30	67	40	35	20	11	4	96	73
Quinnipiac	22	12	9	1	25	41	40	36	16	17	3	65	71
Princeton	22	11	0	1	23	60	43	32	14	14	4	79	64
Harvard	22	10	10	2	22	52	48	31	13	16	2	31	79
Yale	22	8	12	2	18	43	53	31	10	17	4	59	83
RPI	22	6	13	3	15	35	50	34	9	19	6	54	78
Union	22	5	15	2	12	45	78	34	7	22	5	65	121
Dartmouth	22	3	16	3	9	25	77	27	5	19	3	37	98
Brown	22	1	21	0	2	25	77	29	2	27	0	46	134
Championship: March 10, 2018 † indicates conference regular season champion; * indicates conference tournament champion Rankings: USCHO.com

== 2017-18 Schedule ==
Date	Opponent^{#}	Rank^{#}	Site	Decision	Result	Record
Regular Season
October 20	at Harvard		Bright-Landry Hockey Center • Allston, MA		0–0–0 (0–0–0)	
October 22	at New Hampshire*		Whittemore Center • Durham, NH			
October 27	at Quinnipiac		High Point Solutions Arena • Hamden, CT			
October 28	at Princeton		Hobey Baker Memorial Rink • Princeton, NJ			
November 4	Maine*		Thompson Arena • Hanover, NH			
November 5	Maine*		Thompson Arena • Hanover, NH			
November 10	Yale		Thompson Arena • Hanover, NH			
November 11	Brown		Thompson Arena • Hanover, NH			
November 24	Holy Cross*		Thompson Arena • Hanover, NH			
December 1	Princeton		Thompson Arena • Hanover, NH			
December 2	Quinnipiac		Thompson Arena • Hanover, NH			
December 6	Harvard		Thompson Arena • Hanover, NH			
December 31	Connecticut*		Thompson Arena • Hanover, NH			
January 5, 2018	at Union		Achilles Center • Schenectady, NY			
January 6	at Rensselaer		Houston Field House • Troy, NY			
January 12	at Cornell		Lynah Rink • Ithaca, NY			
January 13	at Colgate		Class of 1965 Arena • Hamilton, NY			
January 19	St. Lawrence		Thompson Arena • Hanover, NH			
January 20	Clarkson		Thompson Arena • Hanover, NH			
January 26	at Brown		Meehan Auditorium • Providence, RI			
January 27	at Yale		Ingalls Rink • New Haven, CT			
February 2	Colgate		Thompson Arena • Hanover, NH			
February 3	Cornell		Thompson Arena • Hanover, NH			
February 9	Rennselaer		Thompson Arena • Hanover, NH			
February 10	Union		Thompson Arena • Hanover, NH			
February 16	at Clarkson		Cheel Arena • Potsdam, NY			
February 17	at St. Lawrence		Appleton Arena • Canton, NY			
*Non-conference game. ^{#}Rankings from USCHO.com Poll.

== Awards and honors ==
- Christine Honor, 2017-18 Honorable Mention All-Ivy
