= 2017–18 St. Lawrence Saints women's ice hockey season =

Ice hockey season

- Conference: ECAC Hockey
- Home ice: Appleton Arena

Record
- Overall: 2-0-2
- Home: 0-0-0
- Road: 2-0-2

Coaches and captains
- Head coach: Chris Wells
- Assistant coaches: Ted Wisner; Mare MacDougall Bari
- Captain: Hannah Miller
- Alternate captain: Nadine Edney

The St. Lawrence Saints represent St. Lawrence University in ECAC women's ice hockey during the 2017–18 NCAA Division I women's ice hockey season. In the off-season, Kennedy Marchment was drafted by the Buffalo Beauts as the second overall pick in the NWHL draft.

== Recruiting ==
Player	Position	Nationality	Notes
Charlea Pedersen	Forward	Canada	Assistant Captain of the Durham West Jr. Lightning
Skylar Podvey	Defense	United States	Assistant Captain of North American Hockey Academy
Jessica Poirer	Forward	Canada	Attended Ontario Hockey Academy
Rachael Smith	Forward	Canada	Transfer from Mercyhurst
Natalie Wozney	Forward	United States	Assistant Captain of the Durham West Jr. Lightning with Charlea Pedersen

== 2017–18 Saints ==
No.	Nat.	Player	Class	Pos	Height	DoB	Hometown	Previous team
2		Jaimee Cooke	Sophomore	D	5' 9" (1.75 m)		Pelham, New Hampshire	East Coast Wizards
3		Nadine Edney (A)	Junior	F	5' 3" (1.6 m)		Mississauga, Ontario	Mississauga Jr. Chiefs
4		Jacquie Diffley	Sophomore	F	5' 8" (1.73 m)		Burlington, Massachusetts	East Coast Wizards
6		Michelle Alonardo	Senior	F	5' 6" (1.68 m)		Wilmington, Massachusetts	Governor's Academy
7		Jessica Poirer	Freshman	F	5' 6" (1.68 m)		Green Valley, Ontario	Ontario Hockey Academy
8		Kalie Grant	Sophomore	F	5' 4" (1.63 m)		Potsdam, New York	Nepean Jr. Wildcats
9		Kayla Vespa	Sophomore	F	5' 2" (1.57 m)		Hamilton, Ontario	Stoney Creek Jr. Sabres
10		Hannah Miller (C)	Senior	F	5' 9" (1.75 m)		North Vancouver, British Columbia	Okanagan Hockey Academy
11		Justine Reyes	Junior	F	5' 8" (1.73 m)		Chino Hills, California	Anaheim Lady Ducks
12		Rachael Smith	Junior	F	5' 7" (1.7 m)		Stoney Creek, Ontario	Mercyhurst
13		Skylar Podvey	Freshman	D	5' 3" (1.6 m)		Montclair, New Jersey	North American Hockey
14		Emily Middagh	Sophomore	D	5' 7" (1.7 m)		Winnipeg, Manitoba	Team Manitoba
16		Kennedy Marchment	Senior	F	5' 8" (1.73 m)		Courtice, Ontario	Team Ontario Blue
17		Lydia Grauer	Junior	F	5' 8" (1.73 m)		Mukilteo, Washington	Anaheim Lady Ducks
18		Natalie Wozney	Freshman	F	5' 5" (1.65 m)		Whitby, Ontario	Durham West Jr. Lightning
19		Maggie McLaughlin	Sophomore	F	5' 8" (1.73 m)		McLean, Virginia	Washington Pride
20		Kayla Nielson	Junior	F	5' 10" (1.78 m)		Laguna Hills, California	Anaheim Lady Ducks
21		Amanda McClure	Senior	D	5' 7" (1.7 m)		Stratford, Ontario	Cambridge Jr. Rivulettes
22		Charlea Pedersen	Freshman	F	5' 10" (1.78 m)		Bowmanville, Ontario	Durham West Jr. Lightning
24		Dakota Golde	Sophomore	D	5' 6" (1.68 m)		Rolling Meadows, Illinois	Chicago Mission
27		Amanda Butterfield	Sophomore	D	5' 8" (1.73 m)		Grimsby, Ontario	Stoney Creek Jr. Sabres
28		Allison Compeau	Junior	G	5' 5" (1.65 m)		Potsdam, New York	North Country Ice Storm
29		Grace Harrison	Junior	G	5' 9" (1.75 m)		Auckland, New Zealand	Ontario Hockey Academy
31		Sonjia Shelly	Junior	G	5' 6" (1.68 m)		Braceville, Illinois	Chicago Fury

== Standings ==
2017–18 ECAC Hockey standings
	Conference							Overall					
	GP	W	L	T	PTS	GF	GA	GP	W	L	T	GF	GA
#1 Clarkson†*	22	19	3	0	38	90	29	41	36	4	1	158	48
#2 Colgate†	22	19	3	0	38	80	35	41	34	6	1	150	70
#7 Cornell	22	15	5	2	32	66	42	33	21	9	3	100	65
#8 St. Lawrence	22	14	6	2	30	67	40	35	20	11	4	96	73
Quinnipiac	22	12	9	1	25	41	40	36	16	17	3	65	71
Princeton	22	11	0	1	23	60	43	32	14	14	4	79	64
Harvard	22	10	10	2	22	52	48	31	13	16	2	31	79
Yale	22	8	12	2	18	43	53	31	10	17	4	59	83
RPI	22	6	13	3	15	35	50	34	9	19	6	54	78
Union	22	5	15	2	12	45	78	34	7	22	5	65	121
Dartmouth	22	3	16	3	9	25	77	27	5	19	3	37	98
Brown	22	1	21	0	2	25	77	29	2	27	0	46	134
Championship: March 10, 2018 † indicates conference regular season champion; * indicates conference tournament champion Rankings: USCHO.com

== 2017-18 Schedule ==
Date	Opponent^{#}	Rank^{#}	Site	Decision	Result	Record
Regular Season
October 6	at Mercyhurst*	#6	Mercyhurst Ice Center • Erie, PA	Grace Harrison	W 4-1	1–0–0
October 7	at Mercyhurst*	#6	Mercyhurst Ice Center • Erie, PA	Grace Harrison	T 1-1 ^{OT}	1–0–1
October 13	at Merrimack*		Volpe Complex • North Andover, MA	Sonjia Shelly	W 2-1	2–0–1
October 14	at Merrimack*		Volpe Complex • North Andover, MA	Grace Harrison	T 0-0 ^{OT}	2–0–2
October 20	Clarkson		Appleton Arena • Canton, NY			
October 21	at Clarkson		Cheel Arena • Potsdam, NY			
October 27	Cornell		Appleton Arena • Canton, NY			
October 28	Colgate		Appleton Arena • Canton, NY			
November 3	at Brown		Meehan Auditorium • Providence, RI			
November 4	at Yale		Ingalls Rink • New Haven, CT			
November 10	Boston College*		Appleton Arena • Canton, NY			
November 11	Boston College*		Appleton Arena • Canton, NY			
November 17	Princeton		Appleton Arena • Canton, NY			
November 18	Quinnipiac		Appleton Arena • Canton, NY			
November 30	at Clarkson		Cheel Arena • Potsdam, NY			
December 2	Clarkson		Appleton Arena • Canton, NY			
December 8	at Rensselaer		Houston Field House • Troy, NY			
December 9	at Union		Achilles Center • Schenectady, NY			
January 5, 2018	vs. Lindenwood*		Anaheim, CA			
January 6	vs. Lindenwood*		Anaheim, CA			
January 12	Union		Appleton Arena • Canton, NY			
January 12	Rensselaer		Appleton Arena • Canton, NY			
January 19	at Dartmouth		Thompson Arena • Hanover, NH			
January 20	at Harvard		Bright-Landry Hockey Center • Allston, MA			
January 26	at Colgate		Class of 1965 Arena • Hamilton, NY			
January 27	at Cornell		Lynah Rink • Ithaca, NY			
February 2	Yale		Appleton Arena • Canton, NY			
February 3	Brown		Appleton Arena • Canton, NY			
February 9	at Quinnipiac		High Point Solutions Arena • Hamden, CT			
February 10	at Princeton		Hobey Baker Memorial Rink • Princeton, NJ			
February 16	Harvard		Appleton Arena • Canton, NY			
February 17	Dartmouth		Appleton Arena • Canton, NY			
*Non-conference game. ^{#}Rankings from USCHO.com Poll.
