= 2017–18 Brown Bears women's ice hockey season =

- Conference: ECAC
- Home ice: Meehan Auditorium

Record
- Overall: 0–0–0
- Home: 0–0–0
- Road: 0–0–0

Coaches and captains
- Head coach: Bob Kenneally
- Assistant coaches: Katelyn Parker; Kirsti Hussey
- Captain: Cynthia Kyin
- Alternate captain(s): Bridget Carey; Sam Donovan; Abby Niewchas

The Brown Bears represent Brown University in ECAC women's ice hockey during the 2017–18 NCAA Division I women's ice hockey season.

== Recruiting ==
Player	Position	Nationality	Notes
Kaitijane Blumberg	Forward	United States	Played Club Hockey with Honeybaked
Megan Forrest	Forward	Canada	Played with Team Atlantic U18
Maddie Fouts	Defense	United States	Member of Mid-Fairfield Connecticut Stars
Darby Melia	Forward	United States	Attended Thayer Academy
Abby Nearis	Defense	United States	Played with Assabet Valley
Lauren Rippy	Goaltender	United States	Teammate of Blumberg on Honeybaked
Maddie Sisokin	Forward	Canada	Member of Oakville Jr. Hornets

== Roster ==
No.	Nat.	Player	Class	Pos	Height	DoB	Hometown	Previous team
1		Calla Isaac	Sophomore	G	5' 8" (1.73 m)		Sherwood Park, Alberta	Sherwood Park
2		Lucinda Quigley	Sophomore	D	5' 7" (1.7 m)		Newton, Massachusetts	East Coast Wizards
3		Katie Lynch	Junior	F	5' 7" (1.7 m)		Victoria, Minnesota	Benilde-St. Margaret's
4		Maddie Fouts	Freshman	D	5' 5" (1.65 m)		Rye, New York	Nid-Fairfield Connecticut Stars
6		Veronica Alois	Sophomore	F	5' 4" (1.63 m)		Andover, Massachusetts	East Coast Wizards
8		Maybelline Beiring	Sophomore	D	5' 9" (1.75 m)		Calumet, Michigan	Lansing Spartans
9		Jenna Hewitt-Kenda	Junior	F	5' 7" (1.7 m)		North Vancouver, British Columbia	Pacific Steelers
10		Darby Melia	Freshman	F	5' 7" (1.7 m)		Marshfield, Massachusetts	Thayer Academy
11		Samantha Swanstrom	Senior	F	5' 4" (1.63 m)		Ham Lake, Minnesota	Blaine HS
12		Sena Hanson	Sophomore	F	5' 9" (1.75 m)		New Brighton, Minnesota	St. Paul Academy
13		Abby Niewchas (A)	Junior	F/D	5' 8" (1.73 m)		Cochrane, Alberta	Edge School
14		Sarah Migliori	Sophomore	F	5' 5" (1.65 m)		East Greenwich, Rhode Island	Assabet Valley
15		Kaitijane Blumberg	Freshman	F	5' 7" (1.7 m)		Bloomfield Hills, Michigan	Honeybaked
16		Katie Swanstrom	Senior	F	5' 4" (1.63 m)		Ham Lake, Minnesota	Minnesota Jr. Whitecaps
17		Cara Najjar	Junior	D	5' 5" (1.65 m)		Stoneham, Massachusetts	Assabet Valley
18		Leah Olson	Junior	D	5' 5" (1.65 m)		East Harwich, Massachusetts	Assabet Valley
19		Cynthia Kyin (C)	Senior	D	5' 6" (1.68 m)		Skokie, Illinois	Chicago Mission
22		Abby Nearis	Freshman	D	6' 0" (1.83 m)		Beverly, Massachusetts	Assabet Valley
24		Hana DeClerck	Sophomore	F	5' 4" (1.63 m)		Menlo Park, California	Little Caesars
25		Dara Wais	Senior	F	5' 6" (1.68 m)		Baltimore, Maryland	Washington Pride
26		Maddie Sisokin	Freshman	F	5' 8" (1.73 m)		Oakville, Ontario	Oakville Jr. Hornets
28		Bridget Carey (A)	Junior	F	5' 5" (1.65 m)		Weymouth, Massachusetts	Bay State Breakers
30		Julianne Landry	Senior	G	5' 7" (1.7 m)		Hanover, Massachusetts	Assabet Valley
32		Sam Donovan (A)	Senior	F	5' 2" (1.57 m)		New Brighton, Minnesota	Elite Black
38		Lauren Rippy	Freshman	G	6' 0" (1.83 m)		Plymouth, Michigan	Honeybaked
44		Steph Rempe	Sophomore	D	6' 0" (1.83 m)		Calgary, Alberta	Okanagan Hockey Academy
47		Alley Rempe	Sophomore	F	5' 9" (1.75 m)		Calgary, Alberta	Team British Columbia U18
47		Megan Forrest	Freshman	F	5' 7" (1.7 m)		Enfield, Nova Scotia	Team Atlantic U18

== Standings ==
2017–18 ECAC Hockey standings
	Conference							Overall					
	GP	W	L	T	PTS	GF	GA	GP	W	L	T	GF	GA
#1 Clarkson†*	22	19	3	0	38	90	29	41	36	4	1	158	48
#2 Colgate†	22	19	3	0	38	80	35	41	34	6	1	150	70
#7 Cornell	22	15	5	2	32	66	42	33	21	9	3	100	65
#8 St. Lawrence	22	14	6	2	30	67	40	35	20	11	4	96	73
Quinnipiac	22	12	9	1	25	41	40	36	16	17	3	65	71
Princeton	22	11	0	1	23	60	43	32	14	14	4	79	64
Harvard	22	10	10	2	22	52	48	31	13	16	2	31	79
Yale	22	8	12	2	18	43	53	31	10	17	4	59	83
RPI	22	6	13	3	15	35	50	34	9	19	6	54	78
Union	22	5	15	2	12	45	78	34	7	22	5	65	121
Dartmouth	22	3	16	3	9	25	77	27	5	19	3	37	98
Brown	22	1	21	0	2	25	77	29	2	27	0	46	134
Championship: March 10, 2018 † indicates conference regular season champion; * indicates conference tournament champion Rankings: USCHO.com

== Schedule ==
Date	Opponent^{#}	Rank^{#}	Site	Decision	Result	Record
Regular Season
October 20	Robert Morris*		Meehan Auditorium • Providence, RI		0–0–0	
October 21	Robert Morris*		Meehan Auditorium • Providence, RI			
October 27	at Union		Achilles Center • Schenectady, NY			
October 28	at Rensselaer		Houston Field House • Troy, NY			
November 3	St. Lawrence		Meehan Auditorium • Providence, RI			
November 4	Clarkson		Meehan Auditorium • Providence, RI			
November 10	at Harvard		Bright-Landry Hockey Center • Allston, MA			
November 11	at Dartmouth		Thompson Arena • Hanover, NH			
November 17	Cornell		Meehan Auditorium • Providence, RI			
November 18	Colgate		Meehan Auditorium • Providence, RI			
November 28	at Boston University*		Walter Brown Arena • Boston, MA			
December 1	Rensselaer		Meehan Auditorium • Providence, RI			
December 2	Union		Meehan Auditorium • Providence, RI			
December 29	at Sacred Heart*		Sports Center of Connecticut • Shelton, CT			
December 29	at Sacred Heart*		Sports Center of Connecticut • Shelton, CT			
January 2, 2018	at Providence*		Schneider Arena • Providence, RI			
January 6	at Connecticut*		Freitas Ice Forum • Storrs, CT			
January 12	at Princeton		Hobey Baker Memorial Rink • Princeton, NJ			
January 13	at Quinnipiac		High Point Solutions Arena • Hamden, CT			
January 18	at Yale		Ingalls Rink • New Haven, CT			
January 20	Yale		Meehan Auditorium • Providence, RI			
January 26	Dartmouth		Meehan Auditorium • Providence, RI			
January 27	Harvard		Meehan Auditorium • Providence, RI			
February 2	at Clarkson		Cheel Arena • Potsdam, NY			
February 3	at St. Lawrence		Appleton Arena • Canton, NY			
February 9	at Colgate		Class of 1965 Arena • Hamilton, NY			
February 10	at Cornell		Lynah Rink • Ithaca, NY			
February 16	Quinnipiac		Meehan Auditorium • Providence, RI			
February 17	Princeton		Meehan Auditorium • Providence, RI			
*Non-conference game. ^{#}Rankings from USCHO.com Poll.

== Awards and honors ==
- Sam Donovan, 2017-18 Honorable Mention All-Ivy
