= 2017–18 RPI Engineers women's ice hockey season =

Women's ice hockey season

2017–18 Rensselaer Engineers women's ice hockey season
- Conference: ECAC Hockey
- Home ice: Houston Field House

Record
- Overall: 2-4-0
- Home: 0-2-0
- Road: 2-2-0

Coaches and captains
- Head coach: Bryan Vines
- Assistant coaches: Jake Anderson; Christie Cicero

The Rensselaer Engineers represented Rensselaer Polytechnic Institute in ECAC women's ice hockey during the 2017–18 NCAA Division I women's ice hockey season.

== Schedule ==
Date	Opponent^{#}	Rank^{#}	Site	Decision	Result	Record
Regular Season
September 29	at Ohio State*		OSU Ice Rink • Columbus, OH	Lovisa Selander	L 1-4	0–1–0
September 30	at Ohio State*		OSU Ice Rink • Columbus, OH	Lovisa Selander	L 0-4	0–2–0
October 6	Maine*		Houston Field House • Troy, NY	Lovisa Selander	L 1-2	0–3–0
October 7	Maine*		Houston Field House • Troy, NY	Lovisa Selander	L 2-3	0–4–0
October 13	at RIT*		Gene Polisseni Center • Rochester, NY	Lovisa Selander	W 3-1	1–4–0
October 14	at RIT*		Gene Polisseni Center • Rochester, NY	Lovisa Selander	W 4-1	2–4–0
October 27	Yale		Houston Field House • Troy, NY			
October 28	Brown		Houston Field House • Troy, NY			
November 3	at Connecticut*		Freitas Ice Forum • Storrs, CT			
November 4	at Connecticut*		Freitas Ice Forum • Storrs, CT			
November 10	at Princeton		Hobey Baker Memorial Rink • Princeton, NJ			
November 11	at Quinnipiac		High Point Solutions Arena • Hamden, CT			
November 18	New Hampshire*		Houston Field House • Troy, NY			
November 19	New Hampshire*		Houston Field House • Troy, NY			
November 24	at Mercyhurst*		Mercyhurst Ice Center • Erie, PA			
November 25	at Mercyhurst*		Mercyhurst Ice Center • Erie, PA			
December 1	at Brown		Meehan Auditorium • Providence, RI			
December 2	at Yale		Ingalls Rink • New Haven, CT			
December 8	St. Lawrence		Houston Field House • Troy, NY			
December 9	Clarkson		Houston Field House • Troy, NY			
January 5, 2018	Harvard		Houston Field House • Troy, NY			
January 6	Dartmouth		Houston Field House • Troy, NY			
January 12	at Clarkson		Cheel Arena • Potsdam, NY			
January 13	at St. Lawrence		Appleton Arena • Canton, NY			
January 19	at Cornell		Lynah Rink • Ithaca, NY			
January 19	at Colgate		Class of 1965 Arena • Hamilton, NY			
January 26	Union		Houston Field House • Troy, NY			
January 27	vs. Union		Times Union Center • Albany, NY			
February 2	Quinnipiac		Houston Field House • Troy, NY			
February 3	Princeton		Houston Field House • Troy, NY			
February 9	at Dartmouth		Thompson Arena • Hanover, NH			
February 10	at Harvard		Bright-Landry Hockey Center • Allston, MA			
February 16	Colgate		Houston Field House • Troy, NY			
February 17	Cornell		Houston Field House • Troy, NY			
*Non-conference game. ^{#}Rankings from USCHO.com Poll.
