= 2017–18 Colgate Raiders women's ice hockey season =

- Conference: 1st ECAC
- Home ice: Class of 1965 Arena

Rankings
- USCHO.com: 2nd
- USA Today/USA Hockey Magazine: 2nd

Record
- Overall: 34–6–1
- Home: 20–1–1
- Road: 11–3–0
- Neutral: 3–2–0

Coaches and captains
- Head coach: Greg Fargo
- Assistant coaches: Sophie LeClerc; Stefan DeCosse
- Captain: Annika Zalewski
- Alternate captain(s): Jessie Eldridge; Brianne Wilson-Bennett; Liv Altmann

The Colgate Raiders represented Colgate University in ECAC women's ice hockey during the 2017–18 NCAA Division I women's ice hockey season. The season featured Colgate's first ECAC regular season championship, tied with Clarkson, and their first trip to the NCAA Tournament. The Raiders went all the way to the NCAA Championship, losing in overtime to their ECAC rival, Clarkson. In February, the team was ranked first in the nation by both national polls.

== Offseason ==
- August 17: Annika Zalewski was drafted by the Buffalo Beauts in the NWHL, as the 14th overall pick.

=== Recruiting ===
| Player | Position | Nationality | Notes |
| Bailey Bennett | Forward | United States | Played with the Northern Cyclones of the NEWJHL |
| Peri Donaldson | Goaltender | United States | Achieved 12 shutouts with St. Paul's School in 2016–17 |
| Coralie Larose | Forward | Canada | Played for the Nepean Wildcats in Ontario |
| Jackie Leone | Defense | United States | Attended Tabor Academy |
| Malia Schneider | Forward | Canada | Member of 2016 Team Canada U18 |
| Kendall Williamson | Forward | United States | Graduated from Breck School in Minnesota |
| Shelby Wood | Defense | Canada | Played for Team Canada U18 |

== Roster ==
=== 2017-18 Raiders ===
| No. | Nat. | Player | Class | Pos | Height | DoB | Hometown | Previous team |
|---|---|---|---|---|---|---|---|---|
| 1 | | Peri Donaldson | Freshman | G | 5' 6" (1.68 m) | | Keller, Texas | St. Paul's School |
| 3 | | Olivia Zafuto | Junior | D | 5' 6" (1.68 m) | | Niagara Falls, New York | Niagara Jr. Purple Eagles |
| 4 | | Kaila Pinkney | Senior | D | 5' 9" (1.75 m) | | Denfield, Ontario | Team Canada U18 |
| 5 | | Jackie Leone | Freshman | D | 5' 4" (1.63 m) | | Andover, Massachusetts | Tabor Academy |
| 6 | | Shelby Perry | Senior | F | 5' 8" (1.73 m) | | Elginburg, Ontario | Kingston Ice Wolves |
| 7 | | Megan Sullivan | Senior | F | 5' 4" (1.63 m) | | Toronto, Ontario | Whitby Jr. Wolves |
| 8 | | Kendall Williamson | Freshman | F | 5' 2" (1.57 m) | | Edina, Minnesota | Breck School |
| 9 | | Jessie Eldridge (A) | Junior | F | 5' 9" (1.75 m) | | Barrie, Ontario | Toronto Jr. Aeros (PWHL) |
| 10 | | Ellie DeCaprio | Senior | F | 5' 4" (1.63 m) | | Wellesley, Massachusetts | Rivers School |
| 11 | | Breanne Wilson-Bennett (A) | Senior | F | 5' 4" (1.63 m) | | Markham, Ontario | Team Canada U18 |
| 12 | | Shae Labbe | Junior | F | 5' 6" (1.68 m) | | Calgary, Alberta | Team Canada U18 |
| 15 | | Annika Zalewski (C) | Senior | F | 5' 10" (1.78 m) | | New Hartford, New York | Buffalo Bisons |
| 17 | | Shelby Wood | Freshman | D | 5' 9" (1.75 m) | | Cambridge, Ontario | Team Canada U18 |
| 18 | | Malia Schneider | Freshman | F | 5' 6" (1.68 m) | | Millarville, Alberta | Pursuit of Excellence |
| 19 | | Shannon Ormel | Junior | F | 5' 7" (1.7 m) | | Winnipeg, Manitoba | Team Manitoba |
| 20 | | Anonda Hoppner | Sophomore | F | 5' 11" (1.8 m) | | Carp, Ontario | Team Canada U18 |
| 21 | | Lauren Wildfang | Senior | D | 5' 4" (1.63 m) | | Waterdown, Ontario | Team Canada U18 |
| 22 | | Chelsea Jacques | Junior | D | 5' 5" (1.65 m) | | Calumet, Michigan | Madison Capitols |
| 26 | | Bailey Bennett | Freshman | F | 5' 6" (1.68 m) | | Gardena, California | Northern Cyclones |
| 28 | | Livia Altmann | Junior | F | 5' 4" (1.63 m) | | Arosa, Switzerland | Swiss National Team |
| 31 | | Liz Auby | Sophomore | G | 5' 6" (1.68 m) | | Stoughton, Wisconsin | Madison Capitols |
| 33 | | Julia Vandyk | Junior | G | 5' 8" (1.73 m) | | Cambridge, Ontario | Cambridge Jr. Rivulettes |
| 61 | | Bailey Larson | Junior | F | 5' 2" (1.57 m) | | Sycamore, Illinois | Team USA U18 |
| 91 | | Coralie Larose | Freshman | F | 5' 7" (1.7 m) | | Embrun, Ontario | Nepean Wildcats |

== Schedule ==
| Date | Opponent^{#} | Rank^{#} | Site | Decision | Result | Record |
Regular Season
| October 6 | St. Cloud State* | #10 | Class of 1965 Arena • Hamilton, NY | Liz Auby | W 3–0 | 1–0–0 |
| October 7 | St. Cloud State* | #10 | Class of 1965 Arena • Hamilton, NY | Liz Auby | W 5–0 | 2–0–0 |
| October 14 | #6 Northeastern* | #8 | Class of 1965 Arena • Hamilton, NY | Liz Auby | W 3–0 | 3–0–0 |
| October 15 | #6 Northeastern* | #8 | Class of 1965 Arena • Hamilton, NY | Liz Auby | W 5–2 | 4–0–0 |
| October 20 | Mercyhurst* | #5 | Class of 1965 Arena • Hamilton, NY | Liz Auby | W 4–3 ^{OT} | 5–0–0 |
| October 21 | Mercyhurst* | #5 | Class of 1965 Arena • Hamilton, NY | Julia Vandyk | W 4–1 | 6–0–0 |
| October 27 | at #2 Clarkson | #5 | Cheel Arena • Potsdam, NY | Julia Vandyk | W 4–3 ^{OT} | 7–0–0 (1–0–0) |
| October 28 | at #7 St. Lawrence | #5 | Appleton Arena • Canton, NY | Liz Auby | L 1–3 | 7–1–0 (1–1–0) |
| November 3 | Princeton | #5 | Class of 1965 Arena • Hamilton, NY | Julia Vandyk | W 2–0 | 8–1–0 (2–1–0) |
| November 4 | Quinnipiac | #5 | Class of 1965 Arena • Hamilton, NY | Julia Vandyk | W 4–1 | 9–1–0 (3–1–0) |
| November 10 | at New Hampshire* | #4 | Whittemore Center • Durham, NH | Julia Vandyk | W 7–1 | 10–1–0 |
| November 11 | at New Hampshire* | #4 | Whittemore Center • Durham, NH | Julia Vandyk | W 2–1 | 11–1–0 |
| November 17 | at Yale | #3 | Ingalls Rink • New Haven, CT | Julia Vandyk | W 5–1 | 12–1–0 (4–1–0) |
| November 18 | at Brown | #3 | Meehan Auditorium • Providence, RI | Liz Auby | W 5–3 | 13–1–0 (5–1–0) |
| November 24 | vs. Minnesota-Duluth* | #2 | Gutterson Fieldhouse • Burlington, VT (Windjammer Classic, Opening Round) | Julia Vandyk | L 1–4 | 13–2–0 |
| November 25 | vs. RIT* | #2 | Gutterson Fieldhouse • Burlington, VT (Windjammer Classic, Consolation Game) | Julia Vandyk | W 6–1 | 14–2–0 |
| December 1 | at #7 Cornell | #3 | Lynah Rink • Ithaca, NY | Julia Vandyk | L 1–2 | 14–3–0 (5–2–0) |
| December 2 | #7 Cornell | #3 | Class of 1965 Arena • Hamilton, NY | Julia Vandyk | W 5–4 | 15–3–0 (6–2–0) |
| December 9 | #10 Robert Morris* | #4 | Class of 1965 Arena • Hamilton, NY | Julia Vandyk | T 3–3 ^{OT} | 15–3–1 |
| January 5, 2018 | at Quinnipiac | #4 | High Point Solutions Arena • Hamden, CT | Julia Vandyk | W 2–1 ^{OT} | 16–3–1 (7–2–0) |
| January 6 | at Princeton | #4 | Hobey Baker Memorial Rink • Princeton, NJ | Julia Vandyk | W 3–2 | 17–3–1 (8–2–0) |
| January 12 | Harvard | #4 | Class of 1965 Arena • Hamilton, NY | Julia Vandyk | W 3–2 | 18–3–1 (9–2–0) |
| January 13 | Dartmouth | #4 | Class of 1965 Arena • Hamilton, NY | Julia Vandyk | W 4–1 | 19–3–1 (10–2–0) |
| January 16 | Syracuse* | #4 | Class of 1965 Arena • Hamilton, NY | Liz Auby | W 2–1 | 20–3–1 |
| January 19 | Union | #4 | Class of 1965 Arena • Hamilton, NY | Julia Vandyk | W 6–1 | 21–3–1 (11–2–0) |
| January 20 | Rensselaer | #4 | Class of 1965 Arena • Hamilton, NY | Julia Vandyk | W 5–0 | 22–3–1 (12–2–0) |
| January 26 | #8 St. Lawrence | #2 | Class of 1965 Arena • Hamilton, NY | Julia Vandyk | W 5–2 | 23–3–1 (13–2–0) |
| January 27 | #3 Clarkson | #2 | Class of 1965 Arena • Hamilton, NY | Julia Vandyk | L 3–5 | 23–4–1 (13–3–0) |
| February 2 | at Dartmouth | #4 | Thompson Arena • Hanover, NH | Liz Auby | W 5–1 | 24–4–1 (14–3–0) |
| February 3 | at Harvard | | Bright-Landry Hockey Center • Allston, MA | Julia Vandyk | W 4–0 | 25–4–1 (15–3–0) |
| February 9 | Brown | | Class of 1965 Arena • Hamilton, NY | Liz Auby | W 2–0 | 26–4–1 (16–3–0) |
| February 10 | Yale | | Class of 1965 Arena • Hamilton, NY | Julia Vandyk | W 2–0 | 27–4–1 (17–3–0) |
| February 16 | at Rensselaer | #3 | Houston Field House • Troy, NY | Julia Vandyk | W 3–2 | 28–4–1 (18–3–0) |
| February 17 | at Union | #3 | Achilles Center • Schenectady, NY | Julia Vandyk | W 6–1 | 29–4–1 (19–3–0) |
ECAC Tournament
| February 23 | Harvard* | #4 | Class of 1965 Arena • Hamilton, NY (Quarterfinals, Game 1) | Julia Vandyk | W 6–4 | 30–4–1 |
| February 24 | Harvard* | #4 | Class of 1965 Arena • Hamilton, NY (Quarterfinals, Game 2) | Julia Vandyk | W 6–1 | 31–4–1 |
| March 3 | vs. #7 Cornell* | #3 | Cheel Arena • Potsdam, NY (Semifinal Game) | Julia Vandyk | W 5–4 | 32–4–1 |
| March 4 | at #2 Clarkson* | #3 | Cheel Arena • Potsdam, NY (Championship Game) | Julia Vandyk | L 0–3 | 32–5–1 |
NCAA Tournament
| March 10 | #9 Northeastern* | #3 | Class of 1965 Arena • Hamilton, NY (Quarterfinal Game) | Julia Vandyk | W 3-1 | 33–5–1 |
| March 16 | vs. #2 Wisconsin* | #3 | Ridder Arena • Minneapolis, MN (Frozen Four, Semifinal Game) | Julia Vandyk | W 4-3 ^{2OT} | 34–5–1 |
| March 18 | vs. #1 Clarkson* | #3 | Ridder Arena • Minneapolis, MN (National Championship Game) | Julia Vandyk | L 1-2 ^{OT} | 34–6–1 |
*Non-conference game. ^{#}Rankings from USCHO.com Poll.

== Awards and honors ==
- Head Coach Greg Fargo was named AHCA Coach of the Year
- Lauren Wildfang was chosen to the All-ECAC First Team, while Jessie Eldridge was named to the second team, and Julia Vandyk and Shae Labbe to the third team.
