= 2017–18 Princeton Tigers women's ice hockey season =

- Conference: ECAC Hockey
- Home ice: Hobey Baker Memorial Rink

Record
- Overall: 0-0-0
- Home: 0-0-0
- Road: 0-0-0

Coaches and captains
- Head coach: Cara Morey
- Assistant coaches: Ashley Kilstein; Kelly Nash
- Captain: Kiersten Falck
- Alternate captain(s): Stephanie Sucharda; Karly Lund

The Princeton Tigers represent Princeton University in ECAC women's ice hockey during the 2017–18 NCAA Division I women's ice hockey season.

In the immediate aftermath of the successful 2016-17 campaign, Kelsey Koelzer signed a late season contract with the New York Riveters of the NWHL. Koelzer, who has since graduated, signed in time to bolster the Riveter's playoff roster. Following a bid to make the US National Team for the 2018 Olympics, Koelzer re-signed with New York (renamed the Metropolitan Riveters), for 2017–18.

In June, longtime head coach Jeff Kampersal announced his departure to coach the Penn State Nittany Lions after 21 seasons at Princeton. Kampersal ranks 11th all-time in wins for NCAA women's hockey coaches. Less than two weeks later, Assistant coach Cara Morey was named Head Coach.

== Recruiting ==
Player	Position	Nationality	Notes
Sharon Frankel	Forward	United States	Played for Mid-Fairfield Connecticut Stars
Shannon Griffin	Forward	United States	Forward for the East Coast Wizards
Amanda Harris	Forward	United States	Attended Onyario Hockey Academy
Annie MacDonald	Forward	Canada	Played for the Oakville Jr. Hornets
Rachel McQuigge	Goaltender	Canada	Played for Whitby Jr. Wolves
Sarah Verbeek	Forward	Canada	Skated for the Cambridge Jr. Rivulettes

== 2017–18 Tigers ==
No.	Nat.	Player	Class	Pos	Height	DoB	Hometown	Previous team
4		Claire Thompson	Sophomore	D	5' 8" (1.73 m)		Toronto, Ontario	Toronto Jr. Aeros
5		Kimiko Marinacci	Junior	D	5' 6" (1.68 m)		Ottawa, Ontario	Ottawa Lady Senators
6		Julia Edgar	Sophomore	D	5' 7" (1.7 m)		Oakville, Ontario	Team Canada U18
10		Sarah Verbeek	Freshman	F	5' 9" (1.75 m)		Timmins, Ontario	Cambridge Jr. Rivulettes
11		Shannon Griffin	Freshman	D	5' 4" (1.63 m)		Arlington, Massachusetts	East Coast Wizards
12		Annie Macdonald	Freshman	F	5' 4" (1.63 m)		Fall River, Nova Scotia	Oakville Jr. Hornets
13		Sylvie Wallin	Sophomore	D	5' 10" (1.78 m)		Edina, Minnesota	Blake School
17		Keiko DeClerck	Junior	F	5' 5" (1.65 m)		San Jose, California	Team USA Development U19
18		Sharon Frankel	Freshman	F	5' 1" (1.55 m)		West Hartford, Connecticut	Mid Fairfield Connecticut Stars
19		Amanda Harris	Freshman	F	5' 11" (1.8 m)		Troy, Michigan	Ontario Hockey Academy
20		Carly Bullock	Sophomore	F	5' 7" (1.7 m)		Eden Prairie, Minnesota	Blake
21		Karlie Lund (A)	Junior	F	5' 10" (1.78 m)		Eden Prairie, Minnesota	Blake School
22		Kiersten Falck (C)	Senior	F	5' 5" (1.65 m)		Ham Lake, Minnesota	Minnesota Jr. Whitecaps
23		Emily Achterkirch	Senior	D	5' 7" (1.7 m)		St. Michael, Minnesota	Minnesota Jr. Whitecaps
25		Stephanie Sucharda (A)	Junior	D	5' 8" (1.73 m)		Mississauga, Ontario	Mississauga Jr. Chiefs
26		MacKenzie Ebel	Sophomore	F	5' 7" (1.7 m)		Airdrie, Alberta	Kent School
31		Alysia Dasilva	Senior	G	5' 7" (1.7 m)		Oakville, Ontario	Mississauga Jr. Chiefs
33		Rachel McQuigge	Freshman	G	5' 7" (1.7 m)		Bowmanville, Ontario	Whitby Jr. Wolves
35		Steph Neatby	Sophomore	G	6' 0" (1.83 m)		Toronto, Ontario	Toronto Jr. Aeros

== Standings ==
2017–18 ECAC Hockey standings
	Conference							Overall					
	GP	W	L	T	PTS	GF	GA	GP	W	L	T	GF	GA
#1 Clarkson†*	22	19	3	0	38	90	29	41	36	4	1	158	48
#2 Colgate†	22	19	3	0	38	80	35	41	34	6	1	150	70
#7 Cornell	22	15	5	2	32	66	42	33	21	9	3	100	65
#8 St. Lawrence	22	14	6	2	30	67	40	35	20	11	4	96	73
Quinnipiac	22	12	9	1	25	41	40	36	16	17	3	65	71
Princeton	22	11	0	1	23	60	43	32	14	14	4	79	64
Harvard	22	10	10	2	22	52	48	31	13	16	2	31	79
Yale	22	8	12	2	18	43	53	31	10	17	4	59	83
RPI	22	6	13	3	15	35	50	34	9	19	6	54	78
Union	22	5	15	2	12	45	78	34	7	22	5	65	121
Dartmouth	22	3	16	3	9	25	77	27	5	19	3	37	98
Brown	22	1	21	0	2	25	77	29	2	27	0	46	134
Championship: March 10, 2018 † indicates conference regular season champion; * indicates conference tournament champion Rankings: USCHO.com

== Schedule ==
Date	Opponent^{#}	Rank^{#}	Site	Decision	Result	Record
Regular Season
October 20	Providence*		Hobey Baker Memorial Rink • Princeton, NJ		0–0–0	
October 21	Providence*		Hobey Baker Memorial Rink • Princeton, NJ			
October 27	Harvard		Hobey Baker Memorial Rink • Princeton, NJ			
October 28	Dartmouth		Hobey Baker Memorial Rink • Princeton, NJ			
November 3	at Colgate		Class of 1965 Arena • Hamilton, NY			
November 4	at Cornell		Lynah Rink • Ithaca, NY			
November 10	Rensselaer		Hobey Baker Memorial Rink • Princeton, NJ			
November 11	Union		Hobey Baker Memorial Rink • Princeton, NJ			
November 17	at St. Lawrence		Appleton Arena • Canton, NY			
November 18	at Clarkson		Cheel Arena • Potsdam, NY			
November 24	at Merrimack*		Volpe Complex • North Andover, MA			
November 25	at Merrimack*		Volpe Complex • North Andover, MA			
December 1	at Dartmouth		Thompson Arena • Hanover, NH			
December 2	at Harvard		Bright-Landry Hockey Center • Allston, MA			
December 8	Quinnipiac		Hobey Baker Memorial Rink • Princeton, NJ			
December 9	at Quinnipiac		High Point Solutions Arena • Hamden, CT			
December 30	Boston University*		Hobey Baker Memorial Rink • Princeton, NJ			
December 31	Boston University*		Hobey Baker Memorial Rink • Princeton, NJ			
January 5, 2018	Cornell		Hobey Baker Memorial Rink • Princeton, NJ			
January 6	Colgate		Hobey Baker Memorial Rink • Princeton, NJ			
January 12	Brown		Hobey Baker Memorial Rink • Princeton, NJ			
January 13	Yale		Hobey Baker Memorial Rink • Princeton, NJ			
January 30	at Penn State*		Pegula Ice Arena • University Park, PA			
February 2	at Union		Achilles Center • Schenectady, NY			
February 3	at Rensselaer		Houston Field House • Troy, NY			
February 9	Clarkson		Hobey Baker Memorial Rink • Princeton, NJ			
February 10	St. Lawrence		Hobey Baker Memorial Rink • Princeton, NJ			
February 16	at Yale		Ingalls Rink • New Haven, CT			
February 17	at Brown		Meehan Auditorium • Providence, RI			
*Non-conference game. ^{#}Rankings from USCHO.com Poll.

== Awards and honors ==
- Carly Bullock, 2017-18 First Team All-Ivy
- Karlie Lund, 2017-18 Second Team All-Ivy
- Claire Thompson, 2017-18 Second Team All-Ivy
- Stephanie Sucharda, 2017-18 Second Team All-Ivy
- Stephanie Neatby, 2017-18 Second Team All-Ivy
