= 2016–17 Union Dutchwomen ice hockey season =

Dutch hockey team

2016–17 Union Dutchwomen women's ice hockey season
- Conference: ECAC Hockey
- Home ice: Achilles Center

Record
- Overall: 5-28-1
- Home: 3-14-1
- Road: 2-14-0

Coaches and captains
- Head coach: Josh Sciba
- Assistant coaches: Mitch Baker; Whitney Colbert
- Captain: Alli Devins

The Union Dutchwomen represented Union College in ECAC women's ice hockey during the 2016–17 NCAA Division I women's ice hockey season.

== Recruiting ==
Player	Position	Nationality	Notes
Rachel de Perio	Forward	United States	Transfer from Niagara University
Abby Ellis	Defense	United States	Played for Mass Spitfires U19
Cheyenne Harris	Forward	United States	Attended Breck School
Amelia Murray	Goaltender	United States	Tended Net for Chicago Young Americans
Jordi Naidrich	Forward	United States	Played on the New Jersey Rockets team
Ava Reynolds	Defense	United States	Blueliner with Northern Cyclones
Katelynn Russ	Forward	United States	Teammate of Amelia Murray on Chicago Young Americans
Haley Shugart	Forward	Canada	Played with Toronto Jr. Aeros
Kate Spooner	Goaltender	Canada	Tended Goal with Pro Cresting Penguins
Bridgit Sullivan	Forward	United States	Attended Northwood School
Celine Tessier	Goaltender	Canada	Played for the Nepean Jr. Wildcats

== 2016–17 Dutchwomen ==
No.	Nat.	Player	Class	Pos	Height	DoB	Hometown	Previous team
3		Rachel de Perio	Freshman	F	5' 3" (1.6 m)		East Amherst, New York	Niagara University
4		Brandy Streeter	Junior	D	5' 2" (1.57 m)		Morrisville, New York	Buffalo Bison
5		Ava Reynolds	Freshman	D	5' 6" (1.68 m)		Aurora, Colorado	Northern Cyclones
6		Eastyn Yuen	Senior	F	5' 3" (1.6 m)		Winnipeg, Manitoba	Shaftesbury Prep
7		Bridgit Sullivan	Freshman	F	5' 4" (1.63 m)		Vermontville, New York	Northwood School
9		Ali Devins (C)	Senior	F	5' 5" (1.65 m)		White River Junction, Vermont	Westminster School
11		Cheyenne Harris	Freshman	F	5' 7" (1.7 m)		Minneapolis, Minnesota	Breck School
13		Arianna Kosakowski	Sophomore	D	5' 8" (1.73 m)		Ashburnham, Massachusetts	Assabet Valley
17		Haley Shugart	Freshman	F	5' 7" (1.7 m)		Toronto, Ontario	Toronto Jr. Aeros
18		Caitlyn McLaren	Junior	D	5' 8" (1.73 m)		Metcalfe, Ontario	Ottawa Lady Senators
19		Katie Laughlin	Junior	F	5' 9" (1.75 m)		Natick, Massachusetts	Assabet Valley
20		Kathryn Davis	Senior	D	5' 7" (1.7 m)		Milton, Massachusetts	Lawrence Academy
22		Emily Erickson	Senior	F	5' 4" (1.63 m)		Crosslake, Minnesota	North American Hockey Academy
23		Katelynn Russ	Freshman	F	5' 4" (1.63 m)		Crystal Lake, Illinois	Chicago Young Americans
26		Jordi Naidrich	Freshman	F	5' 5" (1.65 m)		Newtown, Pennsylvania	New Jersey Rockets
29		Kate Spooner	Freshman	G	5' 7" (1.7 m)		Grand-Pré, Nova Scotia	Pro Cresting Penguins
33		Amelia Murray	Freshman	G	5' 8" (1.73 m)		McHenry, Illinois	Chicago Young Americans
34		Céline Tessier	Freshman	G	5' 8" (1.73 m)		Chapleau, Ontario	Nepean Jr. Wildcats

== 2015-16 schedule ==
Date	Opponent^{#}	Rank^{#}	Site	Decision	Result	Record
Regular Season
September 30	Connecticut*		Achilles Center • Schenectady, NY	Céline Tessier	L 1–5	0–1–0
October 1	Connecticut*		Achilles Center • Schenectady, NY	Kate Spooner	L 1–2	0–2–0
October 4	Vermont*		Achilles Center • Schenectady, NY	Kate Spooner	L 1–5	0–3–0
October 7	Penn State*		Achilles Center • Schenectady, NY	Kate Spooner	L 1–8	0–4–0
October 8	Penn State*		Achilles Center • Schenectady, NY	Kate Spooner	W 4–2	1–4–0
October 14	at RIT*		Gene Polisseni Center • Rochester, NY	Kate Spooner	W 2–0	2–4–0
October 15	at RIT*		Gene Polisseni Center • Rochester, NY	Kate Spooner	L 0–2	2–5–0
October 18	at Providence*		Schneider Arena • Providence, RI	Céline Tessier	L 2–4	2–6–0
October 28	#7 Colgate		Achilles Center • Schenectady, NY	Kate Spooner	L 0–2	2–7–0 (0–1–0)
October 29	Cornell		Achilles Center • Schenectady, NY	Amelia Murray	L 1–3	2–8–0 (0–2–0)
November 4	at Brown		Meehan Auditorium • Providence, RI	Amelia Murray	L 1–3	2–9–0 (0–3–0)
November 5	at Yale		Ingalls Rink • New Haven, CT	Amelia Murray	L 1–5	2–10–0 (0–4–0)
November 11	at #7 Clarkson		Cheel Arena • Potsdam, NY	Kate Spooner	L 1–5	2–11–0 (0–5–0)
November 12	at #4 St. Lawrence		Appleton Arena • Canton, NY	Kate Spooner	L 0–4	2–12–0 (0–6–0)
December 2	#8 Quinnipiac		Achilles Center • Schenectady, NY	Kate Spooner	L 0–4	2–13–0 (0–7–0)
December 3	Princeton		Achilles Center • Schenectady, NY	Amelia Murray	L 0–7	2–14–0 (0–8–0)
December 9	at Maine*		Alfond Arena • Orono, ME	Amelia Murray	L 1–2	2–15–0
December 10	at Maine*		Alfond Arena • Orono, ME	Kate Spooner	L 1–3	2–16–0
December 16	Minnesota State*		Achilles Center • Schenectady, NY	Kate Spooner	W 2–1	3–16–0
December 17	Minnesota State*		Achilles Center • Schenectady, NY	Amelia Murray	L 1–2	3–17–0
January 6, 2017	Yale		Achilles Center • Schenectady, NY	Kate Spooner	L 0–2	3–18–0 (0–9–0)
January 7	Brown		Achilles Center • Schenectady, NY	Amelia Murray	L 3–4	3–19–0 (0–10–0)
January 13	at Dartmouth		Thompson Arena • Hanover, NH	Kate Spooner	L 1–2	3–20–0 (0–11–0)
January 14	at Harvard		Bright-Landry Hockey Center • Allston, MA	Kate Spooner	W 3–2 ^{OT}	4–20–0 (1–11–0)
January 20	Rensselaer		Achilles Center • Schenectady, NY	Kate Spooner	T 2–2 ^{OT}	4–20–1 (1–11–1)
January 21	at Rensselaer		Houston Field House • Troy, NY	Kate Spooner	L 1–2	4–21–1 (1–12–1)
January 27	#5 St. Lawrence		Achilles Center • Schenectady, NY	Amelia Murray	L 1–8	4–22–1 (1–13–1)
January 28	#3 Clarkson		Achilles Center • Schenectady, NY	Kate Spooner	L 1–3	4–23–1 (1–14–1)
February 3	at Cornell		Lynah Rink • Ithaca, NY	Kate Spooner	L 1–5	4–24–1 (1–15–1)
February 4	at Colgate		Class of 1965 Arena • Hamilton, NY	Kate Spooner	L 1–4	4–25–1 (1–16–1)
February 10	Harvard		Achilles Center • Schenectady, NY	Kate Spooner	L 0–2	4–26–1 (1–17–1)
February 11	Dartmouth		Achilles Center • Schenectady, NY	Kate Spooner	W 2–1	5–26–1 (2–17–1)
February 17	at Princeton		Hobey Baker Memorial Rink • Princeton, NJ	Amelia Murray	L 1–4	5–27–1 (2–18–1)
February 18	at Quinnipiac		TD Bank Sports Center • Hamden, CT	Amelia Murray	L 0–1	5–28–1 (2–19–1)
*Non-conference game. ^{#}Rankings from USCHO.com Poll.
