= Monja Wagner =

Swiss ice hockey player (born 2003)

- Born: 10 April 2003 (age 23) Romanshorn, Switzerland
- Height: 1.64 m (5 ft 5 in)
- Weight: 63 kg (139 lb; 9 st 13 lb)
- Position: Goaltender
- Catches: Right
- ECAC team Former teams: Union; Shattuck St Mary's
- National team: Switzerland
- Playing career: 2016–present
Medal record
Olympic Games
Bronze medal – third place	2026 Milano Cortina	Team

Monja Wagner (born 10 April 2003) is a Swiss ice hockey player. She participated in women's ice hockey tournament at the 2026 Winter Olympics.

== Playing career ==
At Shattuck St Mary's, Wagner had a 13-9-6 record with a 1.59 goals against average. During the 2022-23 season, Wagner helped Shattuck win the USA Hockey High School National Title.

=== College ===
Wagner currently plays college ice hockey with the Union Garnet Chargers women's ice hockey program in the ECAC conference of the NCAA Division I. She is majoring in Neuroscience.

Of note, Wagner is the first Union women's hockey player named to an Olympic roster.

On 24 September 2023, Wagner made her debut with Union. Versus the St Cloud State Huskies, she recorded 34 saves in a 4-0 loss.

Against the Holy Cross Crusaders on 6 October 2023, Wagner enjoyed her first NCAA win. With 23 saves, Union defeated Holy Cross by a 3-2 mark in overtime.

Among her career highlights with Union, Wagner was the starting goaltender when Union won their second straight Mayor's Cup. Defeating the RPI Engineers on 24 January 2026, Wagner made 22 saves for the win.

== International ==
In Switzerland's opening game of the 2026 Winter Olympics, a 6 February shootout victory versus Czechia, Wagner served as the backup to Saskia Mauer. During preliminary round play, Wagner did not see any game time.
