= Union Garnet Chargers women's ice hockey =

- Current season
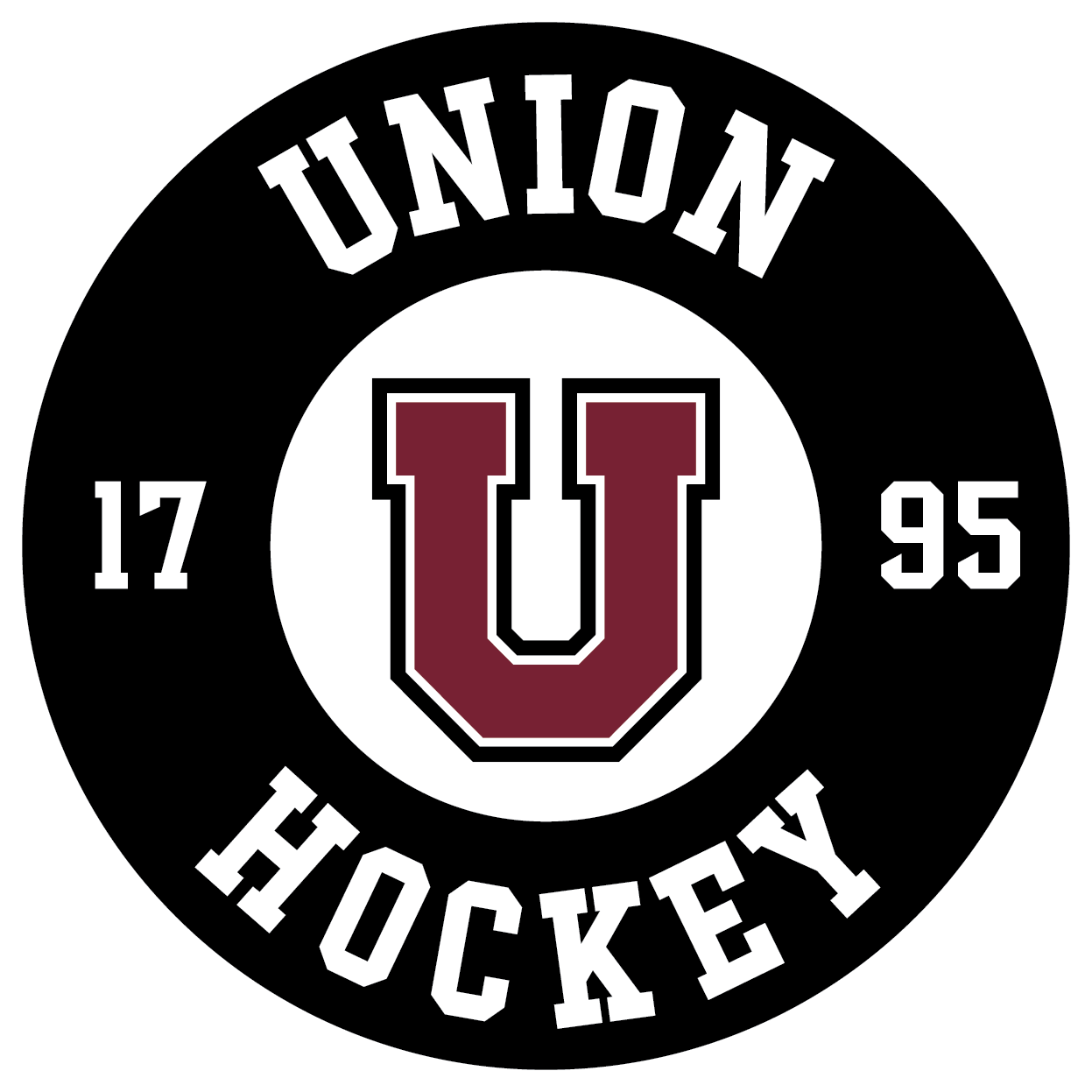
- University: Union College
- Conference: ECAC
- Governing Body: NCAA Division I
- First season: 1999–2000
- Athletic director: Jim McLaughlin
- Head coach: Toni Maci; 2nd season, 24–45–4
- Assistant coaches: Shawn Skelly; Tina Shortridge; Courtney Hall
- Arena: M&T Bank Center; Schenectady, New York
- Colors: Union garnet and white

The Union Garnet Chargers women's ice hockey team represents Union College in Schenectady, New York, United States.

== History ==
From 1999 to 2003, the team competed in Division III hockey. In 2003, the team joined the ECAC.

On February 20, 2010, senior Jackie Koetteritz, had played in her 125th game for the team, setting a record for the most games for the team.

On November 4, 2011: Emilie Arseneault scored a short handed goal late into the second period to give the team a 2–1 conference victory over the Clarkson Golden Knights women's ice hockey program. It was the team's first ECAC win since the 2009–2010 season, and only their second ECAC win since 2004.

Despite ending the 2013–14 season with a 9–24–1 record, several milestones were achieved. Their nine wins, all recorded by goaltender Shenae Lundberg, setting a record for most wins in one season by a goaltender, signified the highest win total under Head Coach Claudia Asano Barcomb. Starting the season 2–0 for the first time in program history, the team enjoyed another notable first, defeating the Princeton Tigers. They also set a new program record with 25 power play goals, as senior forward Stefanie Thomson scored seven power play goals, also a program record. Subsequently, their efforts on the power play resulted in the third best power play in the ECAC conference, ranking eighth best in the nation. As a side note, team captain Maddy Norton would lead the team in assists (18) and points (21).

In 2019–2020, the team finished 9th in the ECAC, their highest finish in the league. They finished the season at 5–24–5 overall, and 5–13–5 in conference play.

Union did not play in 2020-21 due to the COVID-19 pandemic.

In 2022-23, head coach Josh Sciba led Union to one of the best seasons in program history. The Garnet Chargers posted the most wins in single Division I season with 11 victories including a 4-1 win over #15 Princeton on December 3, 2022, securing the program's first-ever victory over a ranked opponent.

Sciba also became the winningest coach in program history on January 21, 2023, in the team's 3-1 victory over Harvard University. The win also marked the first time the Garnet Chargers won a regular season series against the Crimson (1-0-1) in program history.

Union also accomplished one of its best stretches during the month of November, winning three overtime games as a part of a four-game winning streak and a five-game unbeaten streak, both the longest in Division I program history.

On July 31, 2024, Union announced hiring of head coach Tony Maci, following Sciba's departure to join the coaching staff of the PWHL's New York Sirens.

Under the leadership of Maci, Union saw significant progress in the 2024-25 season. Union improved to 3-0-0 in ECAC Hockey for the first time in program history and one three straight conference games for the first time as a Division I program defeating Harvard and Dartmouth before upsetting #3 Cornell on November 1. The win against #3 Cornell marked the first time women's hockey had beaten a Top-10 nationally ranked team in history.

The Garnet Chargers then broke the conference win record (six wins) with a 3-2 victory over Harvard on January 18 and set a new single season wins record (12 wins) with a 2-1 win against Brown on January 31. To cap off the season, Union secured its first-ever playoff win, shutting out Brown, 2-0, in Providence on February 22.

Brown became the second team the Garnet Chargers shut out three games to zero following Union's Mayors' Cup win marked the first time Union had swept Rensselaer, 3-0, in a single season. The Mayors' Cup win marked the second time in history that women's hockey had won the cup, and the first season that both the women's and men's teams won in the same year.

Individually, Sophie Matsoukas set the career saves record for 3,030 in the quarterfinal series against Cornell on March 1. Matsoukas also tied for first in both single-season (three) and career shutouts (six) in the opening round of playoffs against Brown on February 22.

Maren Friday became the first player in program history to win a major award, having been named the recipient of the Mandi Schwartz Scholar-Athlete of the Year Award. Friday also broke the all-time points record among blueliners, tallying her 40th point in the playoff win against Brown on February 22.

Karianne Engelbert broke the single-season rookie points record, scoring both goals in Union's playoff victory against Brown on February 22. Engelbert finished the season with 24 points and became only the second player in program history to be named to an ECAC team, earning a spot on the ECAC All-Rookie Team on February 24.

Stephanie Bourque broke the single season goals (8) and points record (22 points) amongst blueliners.

Emma Hebert broke the Ironwoman streak recording, playing her 137th career game in the final regular-season game on February 15 at Quinnipiac.

=== Year by year ===
Won championship	Lost championship	Conference champions	League leader

Season	Coach	W	L	T	Conference	Conf. W	Conf. L	Conf. T	Conf. F	Conference Tournament	NCAA Tournament
2025-26	Tony Maci	11	22	3	ECAC	3	18	1	12th ECAC	Won First Round, 2–1 (Clarkson) Lost Quarterfinal series, 0–2 (Yale)	Did not qualify
2024–25	Toni Maci	13	23	1	ECAC	8	14	0	T-9th ECAC	Won First Round, 2–0 (Brown) Lost Quarterfinal series, 0–2 (Cornell)	Did not qualify
2023–24	Josh Sciba	8	25	2	ECAC	3	17	2	11th ECAC	Lost First Round, 2–5 (Yale)	Did not qualify
2022–23	Josh Sciba	11	22	1	ECAC	4	17	1	11th ECAC	Did not qualify	Did not qualify
2021–22	Josh Sciba	5	28	1	ECAC	2	20	0	12th ECAC	Did not qualify	Did not qualify
2020–21	Did not play due to COVID-19										
2019–20	Josh Sciba	5	24	5	ECAC	5	14	3	9th ECAC	Did not qualify	Did not qualify
2018–19	Josh Sciba	4	28	2	ECAC	2	19	1	12th ECAC	Did not qualify	Did not qualify
2017–18	Josh Sciba	7	22	5	ECAC	5	15	2	10th ECAC	Did not qualify	Did not qualify
2016–17	Josh Sciba	5	28	1	ECAC	2	19	1	12th ECAC	Did not qualify	Did not qualify
2015–16	Claudia Asano Barcomb	0	28	6	ECAC	0	19	3	12th ECAC	Did not qualify	Did not qualify
2014–15	Claudia Asano Barcomb	4	22	8	ECAC	1	16	5	11th ECAC	Did not qualify	Did not qualify
2013–14	Claudia Asano Barcomb	9	24	1	ECAC	4	18	0	12th ECAC	Did not qualify	Did not qualify
2012–13	Claudia Asano Barcomb	7	23	4	ECAC	0	18	4	12th ECAC	Did not qualify	Did not qualify
2011–12	Claudia Asano Barcomb	4	26	4	ECAC	2	18	2	11th ECAC	Did not qualify	Did not qualify
2010–11	Claudia Asano Barcomb	2	29	3	ECAC	1	19	2	12th ECAC	Did not qualify	Did not qualify
2009–10	Claudia Asano Barcomb	5	28	1	ECAC	1	20	1	12th ECAC	Did not qualify	Did not qualify
2008–09	Claudia Asano Barcomb	2	29	3	ECAC	0	21	1	12th ECAC	Did not qualify	Did not qualify
2007–08	Claudia Asano Barcomb	3	27	6	ECAC	0	20	2	12th ECAC	Did not qualify	Did not qualify
2006–07	Tim Gerrish	4	26	0	ECAC	0	22	0	12th ECAC	Did not qualify	Did not qualify
2005–06	Tim Gerrish	3	24	1	ECAC	0	20	0	11th ECAC	Did not qualify	Did not qualify
2004–05	Tim Gerrish	5	27	1	ECAC	0	20	0	11th ECAC	Did not qualify	Did not qualify
2003–04	Fred Quistgard	4	29	1	ECAC	1	17	0	10th ECAC	Did not qualify	Did not qualify
2002–03	Fred Quistgard	11	14	1	ECAC D-III East	10	9	1			
2001–02	Fred Quistgard	8	16	2	ECAC D-III East	8	9	1			
2000–01	Fred Quistgard	3	19	2	ECAC D-III East	1	15	2			
1999–2000	Fred Quistgard	4	19	0	ECAC D-III East	4	13	0			

=== Team captains ===
- 2011–12 Dania Simmonds
- 2013–14: Ashley Johnston and Maddy Norton
- 2014–15: Christina Valente

== Current roster ==
As of May 19, 2026.

No.	Nat.	Player	Class	Pos	Height	DoB	Hometown	Previous team
4		Brigitte McGuire	Junior	D	5' 6" (1.68 m)	2005-05-12	Stamford, Connecticut	Shattuck St. Mary's
5		Quinn Dunkle	Junior	D	5' 10" (1.78 m)	2004-10-20	Cedar Rapids, Iowa	University of Minnesota Duluth
6		Megan Ognibene	Junior	F	5' 4" (1.63 m)	2003-10-14	[West Berlin|West Berlin, Vermont]]	North American Hockey Academy
7		Gia Mancy	Sophomore	F	5' 9" (1.75 m)	2001-11-15	[[Toledo, Ohio]	Shattuck St. Mary's
8		Lauren Johnson	Sophomore	D	5' 7" (1.7 m)	2004-07-11	Sun Prairie, Wisconsin	North American Hockey Academy
11		Mikayla Blomquist	Sophomore	F	5' 7" (1.7 m)	2005-03-16	Lake Country, British Columbia	Boston University
13		Peyton O'Neill	Sophomore	D	5' 6" (1.68 m)	2006-04-17	Hindsdale, Illinois	Long Island University
14		Hayley Kelleher	Sophomore	D	5' 5" (1.65 m)	2004-10-03	Natick, Massachusetts	Clarkson University
16		Emma Fulawka	Junior	F	5' 5" (1.65 m)	2004-09-19	Stouffville, Ontario	Mississauga Hurricanes
17		Karianne Engelbert	Sophomore	F	5' 10" (1.78 m)	2005-10-11	Whitby, Ontario	Durham West Jr. Lightning
19		Maddie Leaney	Junior	F	5' 4" (1.63 m)	2005-05-13	[[Maple Ridge, British Columbia]	RINK Hockey Academy Kelowna
20		Amanda Quan		F	5' 5" (1.65 m)	2004-04-13	Torrance, California	Loomis Chaffee School
21		Klara Kenttälä	Sophomore	F	5' 7" (1.7 m)	2002-09-13	[[Stockholm, Sweden]	Lulea HF
22		Greta Kropp	Senior	F	5' 7" (1.7 m)	2004-01-31	Prior Lake, Minnesota	Chicago Young Americans
23		Kaitlyn Toner	Freshman	D	5' 10" (1.78 m)	2007-08-17	Aurora, Ontario	Toronto Jr. Aeros
24		Megan Duplantie	Freshman	F	5' 7" (1.7 m)	2005-04-28	Laval,Québec	Connecticut Polar Bears
25		Isabel Powers	Freshman	D	5' 5" (1.65 m)	2007-05-03	Scottsdale, Arizona	Lovell Academy
26		Stephanie Bourque	Senior	D	5' 4" (1.63 m)	2003-04-02	Moncton, New Brunswick	Stanstead College
28		Mallory Mauracher	Senior	F	5' 7" (1.7 m)	2003-04-11	Celina, Ohio	Quinnipiac University
29		Monja Wagner	Junior	G	5' 5" (1.65 m)	2003-04-10	Romanshorn, Switzerland	Shattuck St. Mary's
30		Sara Da Silva	Sophomore	G	5' 4" (1.63 m)	2006-08-04	Toronto, Ontario	Toronto Leaside Wildcats
33		Emily Evans	Senior	G	5' 7" (1.7 m)	2003-02-06	Corona, California	Milton Academy
35		Emma Rhéaume	Freshman	G	5' 7" (1.7 m)	2005-01-15	Neuville, Québec	Cegep Limoilou Titans
41		Reanna Loberg	Freshman	F	5' 8" (1.73 m)	2007-09-17	Grande Prairie, Alberta	Edmonton Jr. Oilers

== Notable players ==
- Ashley Johnston
  - A defensemen and captain for the New York Riveters in the NWHL. She is also a robotics engineer who has also won the Ashley Kilstein Community Service award as a member of the Union College women's ice hockey team.
- Dania Simmonds
  - A defenseman and alternate captain for the Markham Thunder CWHL winner of the Adrienne Clarkson trophy.

== Awards and honors ==
- Jackie Koetteritz, 2008–09 All-ECAC Hockey Academic Selection
- Emma Rambo, ECAC Rookie of the Week (Week of October 5, 2009)
- 2009 ECAC Turfer Athletic Trophy: Union Dutchwomen team
- Grace Heiting, Finalist, 2021 ECAC Mandi Schwartz Student-Athlete of the Year Award

=== ECAC Weekly Awards ===
- Bella McKee, ECAC Hockey Goaltender of the Week (Union) (awarded October 21, 2019)

=== Team Awards ===
George Morrison MVP Award

- Shenae Lundberg, 2015 George Morrison MVP Award
- Alli Devins, 2017 George Morrison Most Valuable Player award
- Katelynn Russ, 2018 George Morrison Most Valuable Player award
- Katelynn Russ, 2020 George Morrison Most Valuable Player award

Hana Yamasita Coaches Award

- Dania Simmonds, 2012 Coaches Award
- Christine Valente, 2015 Hana Yamashita Coaches Award
- Alli Devins, 2017 Hana Yamasita Coaches Award winner (given to the player that shows a supreme competitiveness, consistently gives 100 percent effort in both practice and games, and is extraordinarily conditioned with an unmatched work ethic)
- Arianna Kosakowski, 2018 Hana Yamashita Coaches'Award
- Megan Ryan, 2020 Hana Yamasita Coaches Award winner

Most Improved Player award

- Dania Simmonds, 2010 Most Improved Player
- Elizabeth Otten, 2015 Most Improved Player
- Eastyn Yuen, 2017 Most Improved Player award
- Alli First, 2018 Most Improved Player
- Olivia Groulx, 2020 "Ancora Imparo" Process Award (formerly Most Improved Player award)

Rookie of the Year

- Erica Kelly, 2015 Rookie of the Year.
- Kate Spooner, 2017 Dutchwomen Rookie of the Year
- Megan Ryan, 2018 Rookie of the Year

Unsung Hero award

- Christine Valente, 2013 Unsung Hero Award
- Christine Valente, 2014 Unsung Hero Award
- Christine Valente, 2015 Unsung Hero Award
- Alli Devins, 2017 Unsung Hero award
- Katie Laughlin, 2018 Unsung Hero Award

Ashley Kilstein '08 Community Service Award

- Dania Simmonds, 2012
- Ashley Johnston 2013
- Ashley Johnston 2014
- Nicole Russell, 2015
- Caitlyn McLaren, 2017
- Amelia Murray, 2018
- Amelia Murray and Rachel de Perio, 2020

Garnet Glue Award

- Makayla Mori, 2020 Garnet Glue Award

== Garnet Chargers in professional hockey ==
= CWHL All-Star	= NWHL All-Star	= Clarkson Cup Champion	= Isobel Cup Champion

Player	Position	Team(s)	League(s)	Years	Championships
Lundy Day	Goaltender	Team Alberta	CWHL	1	
Rhianna Kurio	Forward	Calgary Inferno	CWHL		2016 Clarkson Cup; 2019 Clarkson Cup
Shenae Lundberg	Goaltender	Connecticut Whale	NWHL		
Emma Rambo	Defense	Boston Blades	CWHL	1	
Dania Simmonds	Defense	Markham Thunder	CWHL		2018 Clarkson Cup
Courtney Turner	Defense	Worcester Blades	CWHL 1st pick overall of 2017 CWHL Draft		

=== Olympians ===
- Monja Wagner, Switzerland, 2026 Winter Olympics.

== See also ==
- Union Garnet Chargers men's ice hockey
