= Meehan Auditorium =

Hockey arena in Rhode Island

Coordinates: 41.831432°N 71.399031°W

George V. Meehan Auditorium
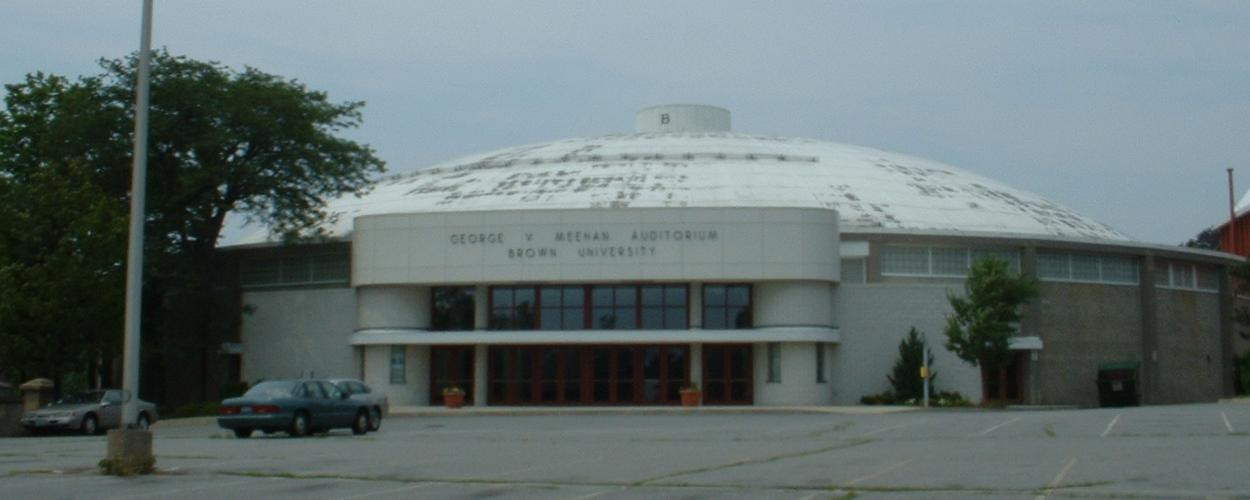
- Interactive map of George V. Meehan Auditorium
- Location: Hope St & Lloyd Ave; Providence, RI
- Owner: Brown University
- Operator: Brown University
- Capacity: 3,100 (hockey)
- Surface: 200x85 ft (hockey)

Construction
- Opened: 1961; 65 years ago
- Renovated: 2002
- Cost: $1.8 million

Tenants
- Brown Bears (men's and women's ice hockey)

The George V. Meehan Auditorium is a 3,059-seat hockey arena, in Providence, Rhode Island. The arena opened in 1961 and was dedicated on January 6, 1962. It is named for George V. Meehan, the benefactor of the arena, which he hoped would "service and promote" the Brown Bears ice hockey program, which now belongs to the Ivy and ECAC Hockey leagues. It is recognizable for its large white domed roof, and is located on the highest corner (Hope Street and Lloyd Avenue) of Brown's main athletic complex on College Hill in Providence.

Meehan was renovated in 2002, bringing its capacity up to its current level.

== Notable events ==
As one of the largest indoor spaces available at Brown University, Meehan has hosted a number of prominent speeches and lectures, in addition to ice hockey events.

On September 28, 1964, at the same time that he was campaigning to stay in office, U.S. President Lyndon B. Johnson addressed the bicentennial convocation of Brown University, in favor of educational opportunity, freedom of conscience and the proposed National Endowment for the Humanities.

In 1965, Meehan Auditorium hosted the Frozen Four ice hockey semi-finals of the National Collegiate Athletic Association (NCAA).

On April 29, 2005, former president Bill Clinton delivered a 50-minute policy lecture titled “Embracing Our Common Humanity: Security and Prosperity in the 21st Century” to a crowd of "thousands" in Meehan.

Almost a year later, on April 8, 2006, Hillary Rodham Clinton, then U.S. Senator from New York and former First Lady, delivered a lecture on the topic of Women Leaders to a crowd of "over 3,000."

== Gallery ==
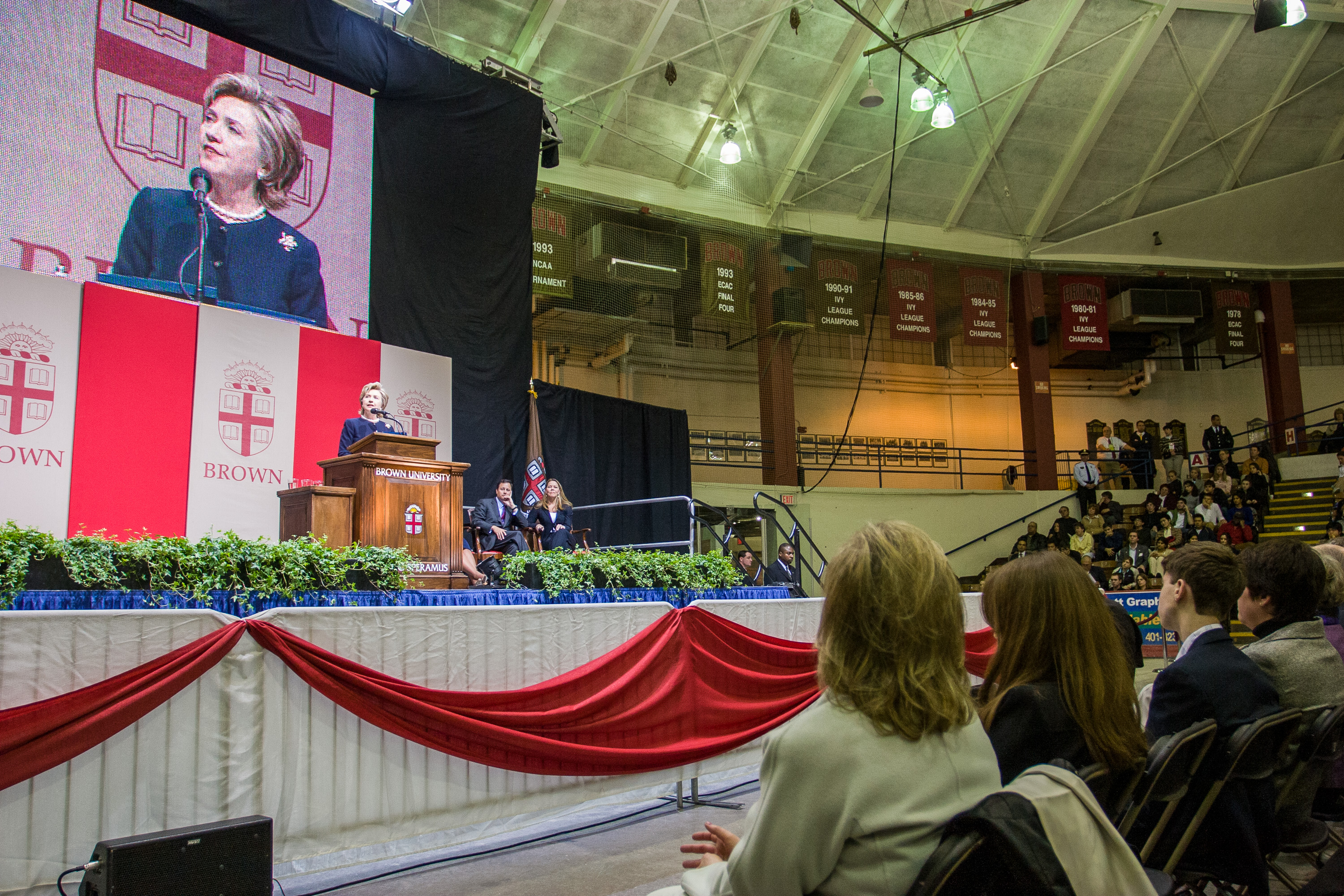
Hillary Rodham Clinton speaks at Meehan in 2006

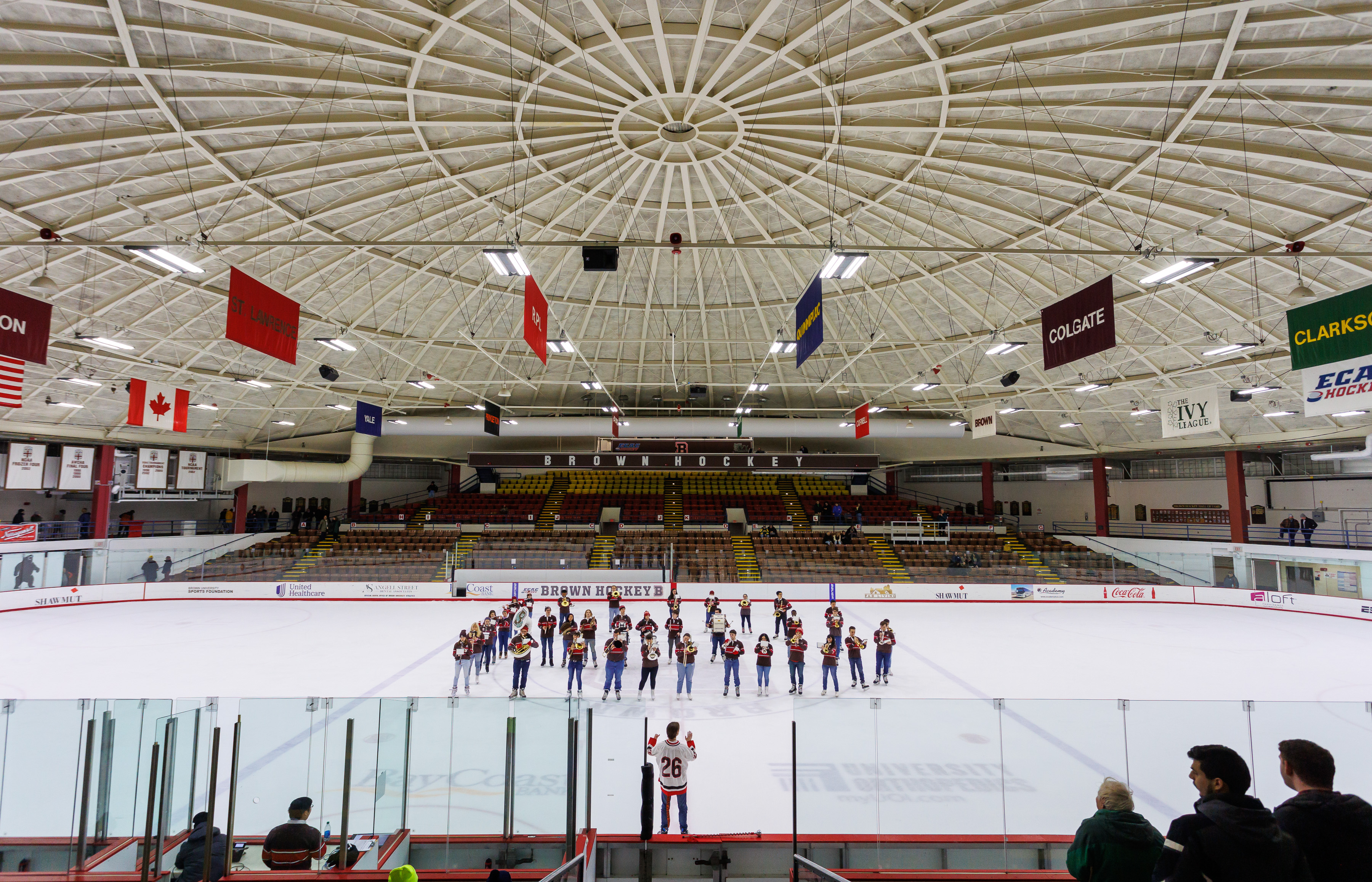
The Brown University Band performs on the ice after a game

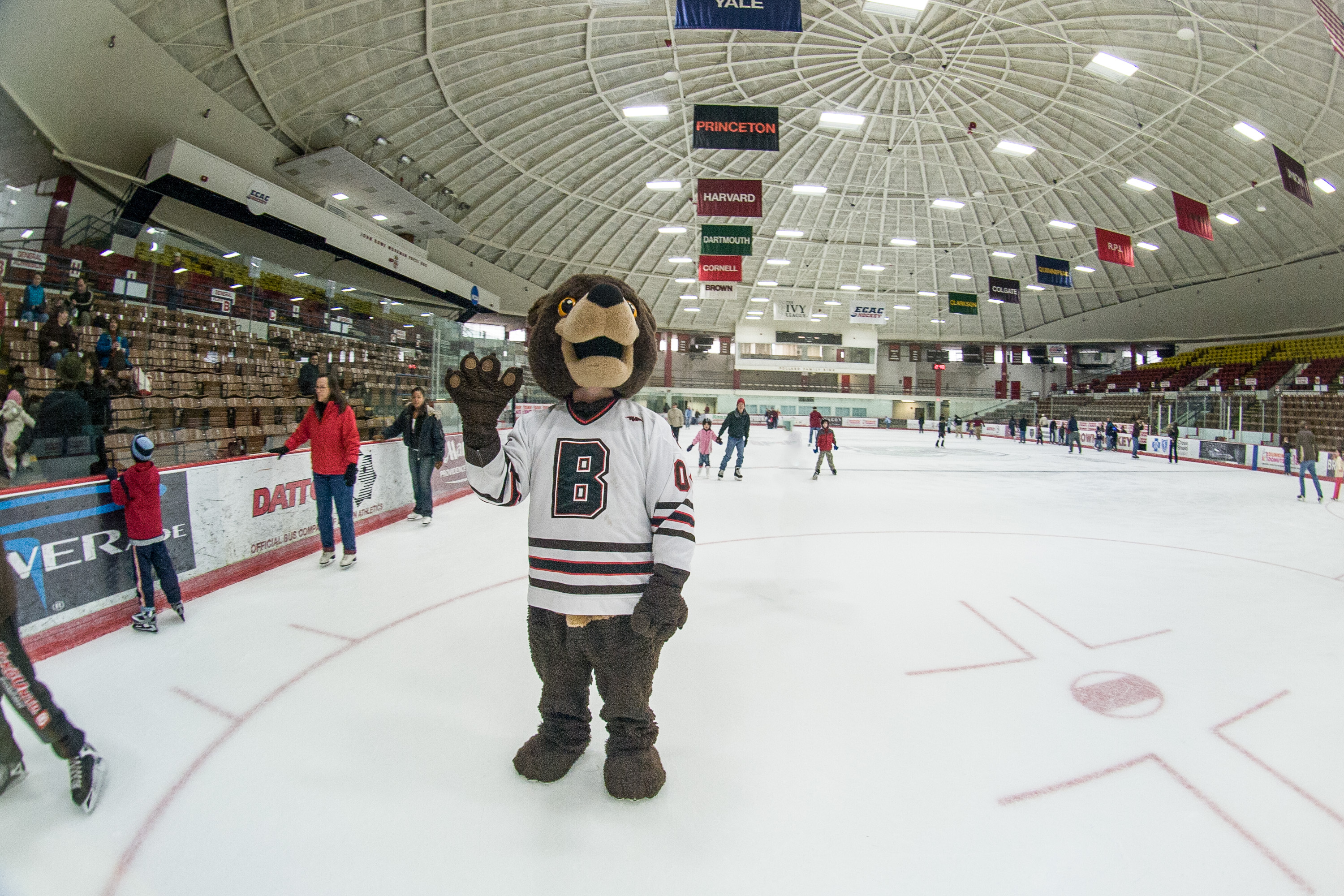
Bruno, Brown's mascot, stands on the ice inside Meehan

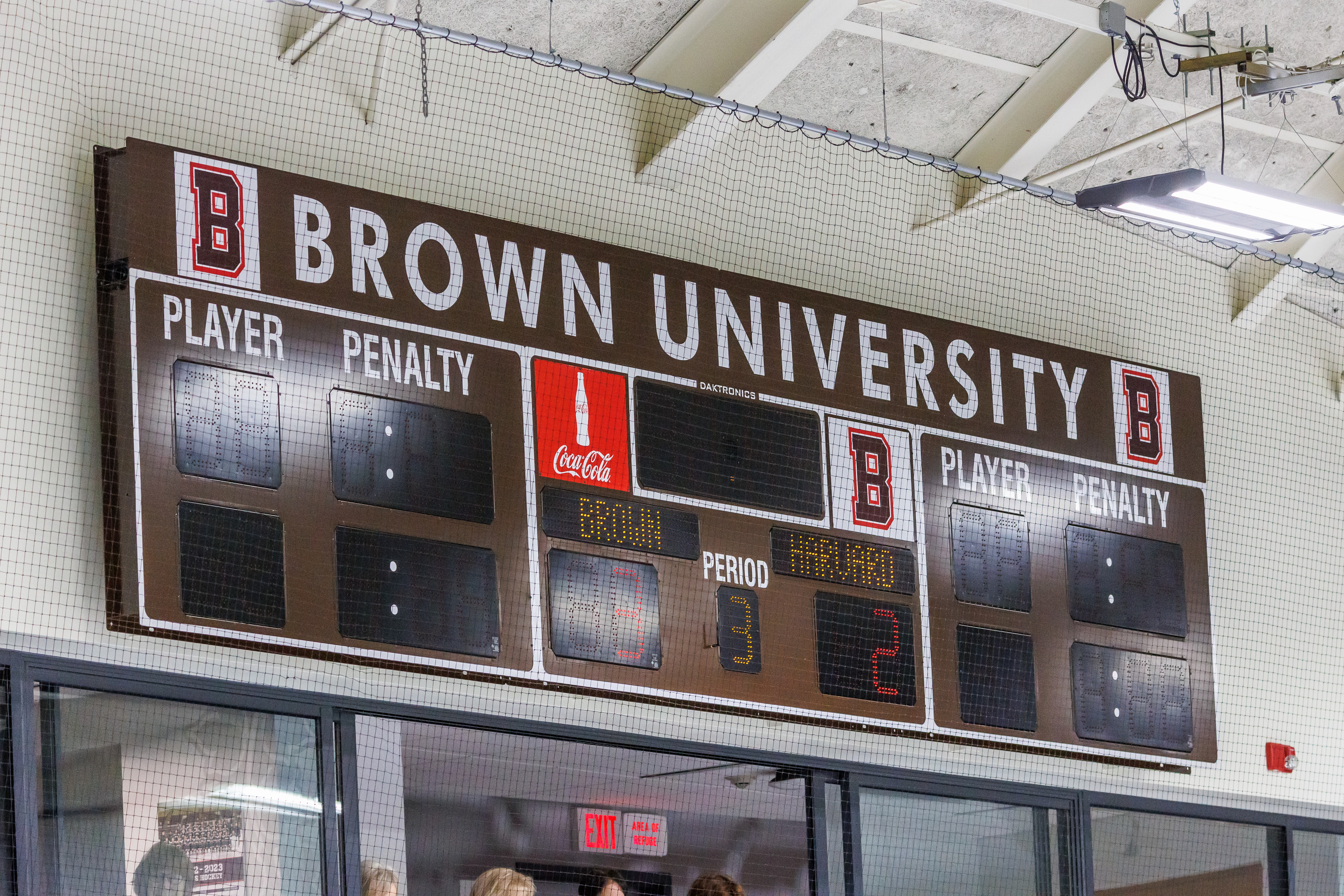
Scoreboard

Preceded by University of Denver Arena; Denver, Colorado	Host of the Frozen Four; 1965	Succeeded by Williams Arena; Minneapolis, Minnesota
