= Bright-Landry Hockey Center =

Ice-hockey arena in Boston, Massachusetts

Coordinates: 42.368342°N 71.127141°W

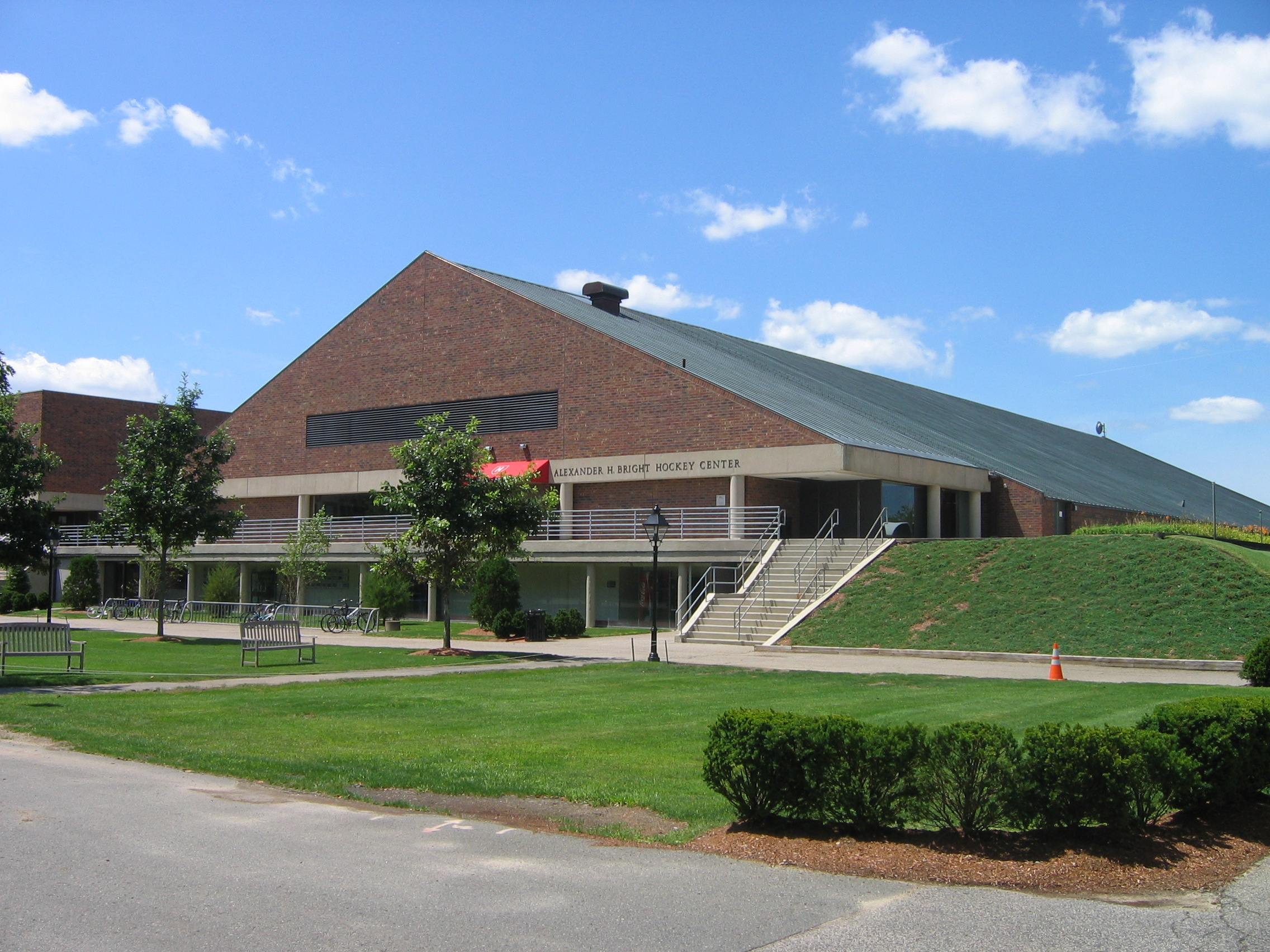
- Interactive map of Bright-Landry Hockey Center
- Former names: Donald C. Watson Rink (1956–1979)
- Location: 65 North Harvard Street; Allston, Massachusetts 02134
- Owner: Harvard University
- Operator: Harvard University
- Capacity: 3,095 (hockey)
- Surface: 204x87 ft (hockey)

Construction
- Opened: 1956
- Renovated: 1979, 2014

Tenants
- Harvard Crimson (NCAA) (1956–1978, 1979–present); Boston Pride (NWHL) (2015–2016)

The Bright-Landry Hockey Center is a 3,095-seat ice-hockey arena in the Allston neighborhood of Boston, Massachusetts, United States. It is home to the Harvard University Crimson men's and women's ice hockey teams. It is named for Alec Bright, class of 1919, a former hockey player, and C. Kevin Landry, class of 1966, a donor to the Harvard athletic department.

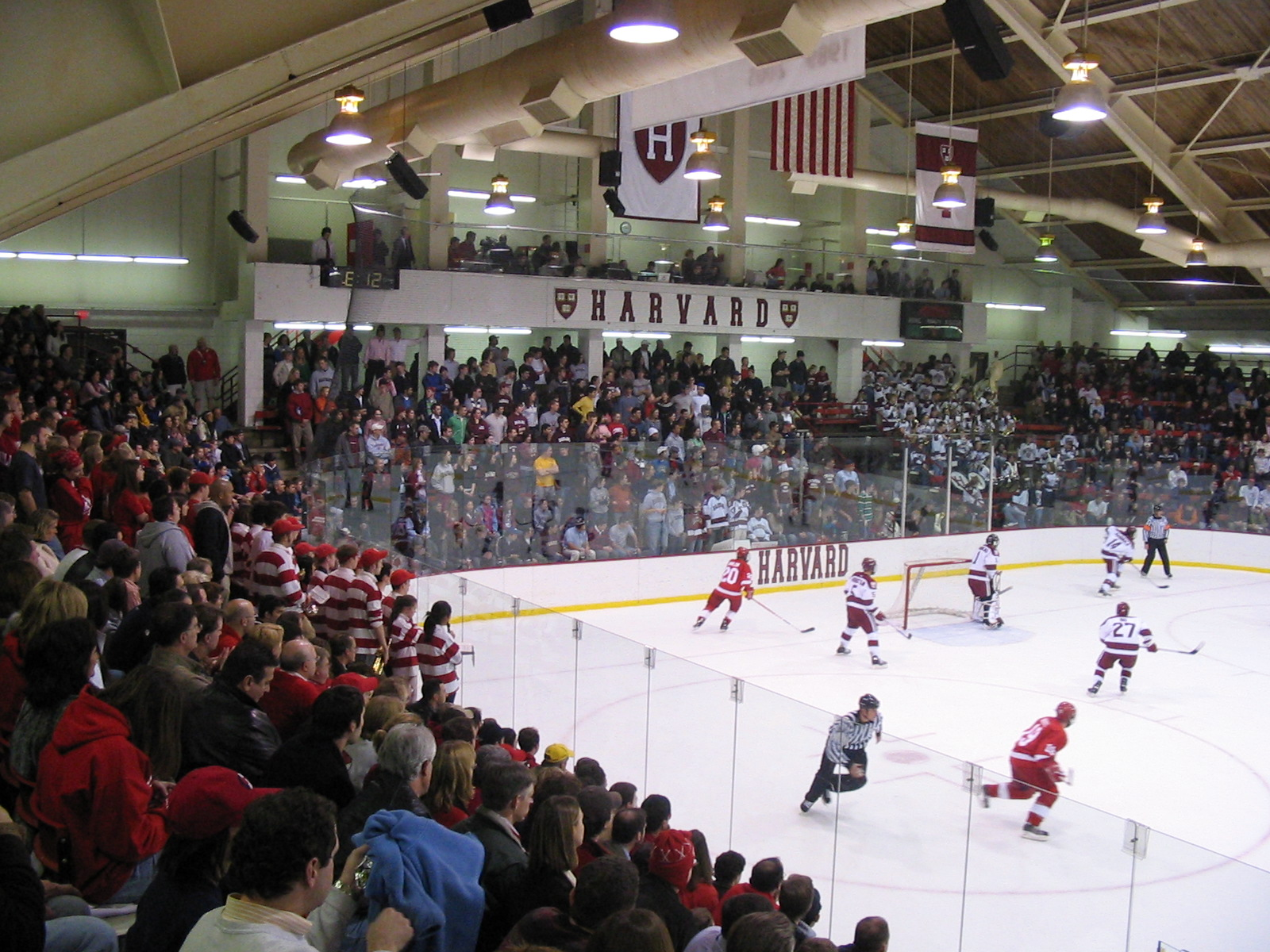
Inside Bright Center

In 1956, the Donald C. Watson Rink was opened just north of Harvard Stadium at Soldiers Field, the area in the Allston neighborhood of Boston used by Harvard athletics, just across the Charles River from campus. The rink held approximately 2,000 people, but did not have many modern amenities. When plans were made to upgrade facilities, the $5-million cost became prohibitive, and the decision was made to renovate Watson Rink. In 1978, following the hockey season, the walls were removed and the roof was extended before the new arena itself was installed. After a season without a full-time home, the "new" arena opened on November 10, 1979, with an exhibition between Harvard and the 1980 USA Olympic hockey team.

In November 2006, Bright Arena was home to the 2006 Friendship Cup, the Cup's debut year. Team USA Alumni, Team Canada Alumni, Team Gazprom and the Boston Bruins Alumni team all participated in the event. The Bruins defeated Team USA, while Gazprom defeated Team Canada.

The arena was also home to the Boston Pride of the National Women's Hockey League for the 2015–16 NWHL season in which the Pride won the Isobel Cup Championship.

The Bright-Landry Center, when used for ice hockey, shares a design quirk with the Bruins' still-standing "original" home rink, today's Northeastern University-located Matthews Arena – the opposing team's benches at the Bright-Landry Center exist on opposing sides of the rink, just as they also did in the 20th century Boston Garden (1928–1995) for ice hockey games.

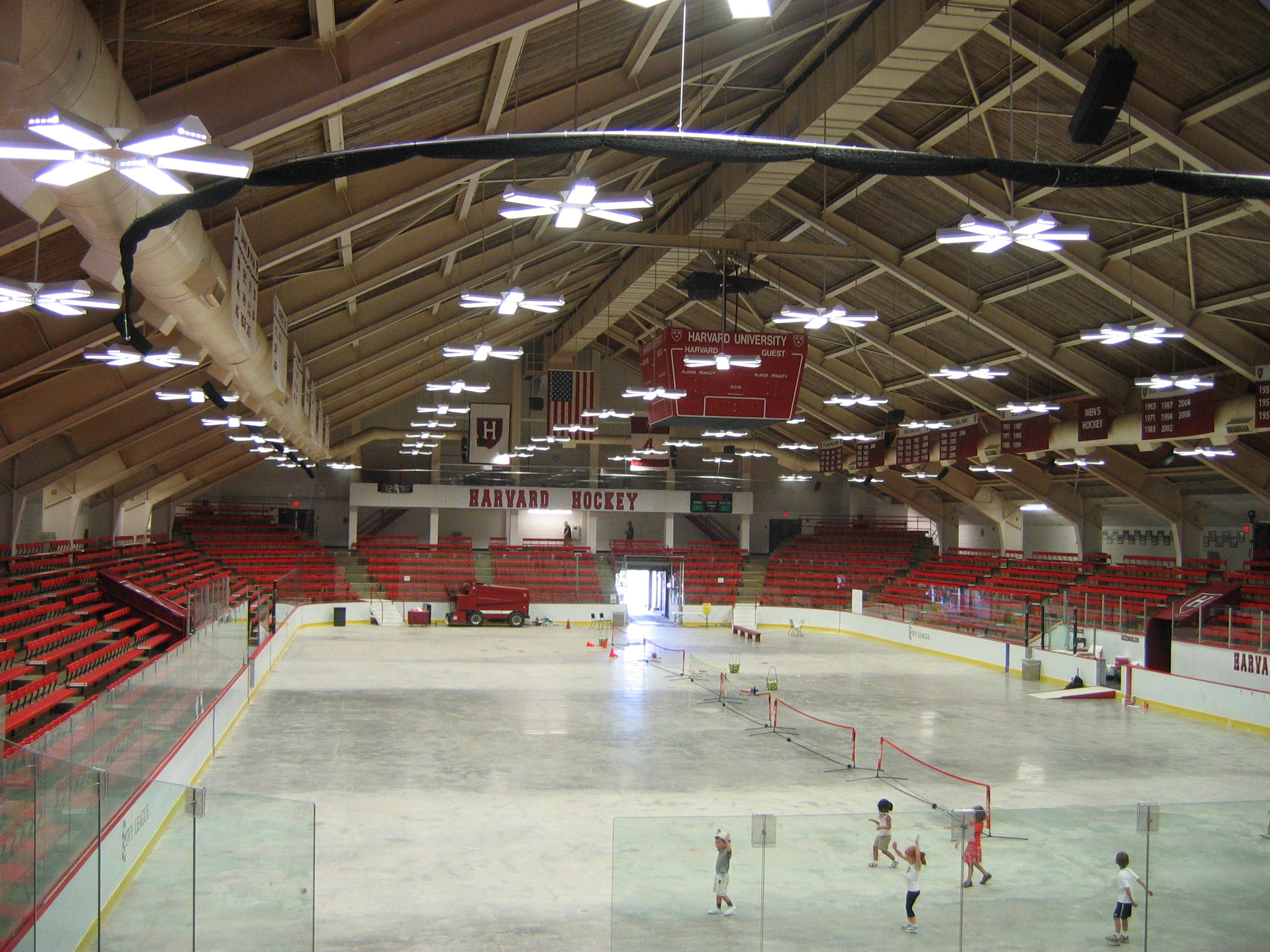
2008, showing the opposing-side team bench locations for hockey.
