= 2017–18 Lindenwood Lady Lions ice hockey season =

2017–18 Lindenwood Lady Lions women's ice hockey season
- Conference: College Hockey America
- Home ice: Lindenwood Ice Arena

Record
- Overall: 10–20–1
- Home: 5–8–1
- Road: 4–10–0
- Neutral: 1–2–0

Coaches and captains
- Head coach: Scott Spencer
- Assistant coaches: Cory Whitaker; Beth Hanrahan
- Captain(s): Britannia Gilanders; Shannon Morris-Reade
- Alternate captain(s): Courtney Ganske; Ally Larson

The Lindenwood Lady Lions women represent Lindenwood University in CHA women's ice hockey during the 2017-18 NCAA Division I women's ice hockey season.

== Offseason ==
=== Recruiting ===
Player	Position	Nationality	Notes
Hannah Alt	Forward	United States	1 of 3 recruits from Chicago Mission
Sierra Burt	Forward	Canada	Chosen for Team Ontario Blue
Mariah Hinds	Defense	Canada	Competed with Team Ontario Red
Jane Jacobs	Defense	Canada	Attended Edge School
Christiana von Aulock	Defense	United States	Defender for Chicago Mission
Megan Wagner	Forward	United States	Chicago Mission veteran

== Standings ==
2017–18 College Hockey America standings
	Conference							Overall					
	GP	W	L	T	PTS	GF	GA	GP	W	L	T	GF	GA
#10 Robert Morris†	20	14	3	3	31	75	30	33	21	8	4	122	70
Mercyhurst*	20	13	4	3	29	58	24	37	18	15	4	94	74
Syracuse	20	11	8	1	23	53	43	36	13	21	2	76	98
Penn State	20	6	7	7	19	43	36	36	10	15	11	65	69
Lindenwood	20	8	12	0	16	37	57	31	10	20	1	61	92
RIT	20	1	19	0	2	19	95	35	4	28	3	42	141
Championship: † indicates conference regular season champion; * indicates conference tournament champion Rankings: USCHO.com

- Rankings based on number of wins in the conference

== Roster ==
=== 2017–18 Lady Lions ===
No.	Nat.	Player	Class	Pos	Height	DoB	Hometown	Previous team
2		Kirsten Martin	Sophomore	F	5' 8" (1.73 m)		Rosedale, British Columbia	Pacific Steelers
4		Mariah Hinds	Freshman	D	5' 10" (1.78 m)		Toronto, Ontario	Team Ontario Red
7		Sierra Burt	Freshman	F	5' 6" (1.68 m)		Bayside, Ontario	Team Ontario Blue
9		Jordyn Pimm	Sophomore	F	5' 8" (1.73 m)		Ottawa, Ontario	Ottawa Lady Senators
11		Erin Near	Sophomore	F	5' 6" (1.68 m)		New Hamburg, Ontario	Toronto Jr. Aeros
12		Ally Larson (A)	Junior	F	5' 6" (1.68 m)		West Vancouver, British Columbia	Pursuit of Excellence
13		Megan Wagner	Freshman	F	5' 1" (1.55 m)		Niles, Illinois	Chicago Mission
14		Jane Jacobs	Freshman	D	5' 6" (1.68 m)		Carseland, Alberta	Edge School
15		Emma Hare		F	5' 6" (1.68 m)		Penticton, British Columbia	Pursuit of Excellence
16		Cierra Paisley	Sophomore	F	5' 6" (1.68 m)		Shawnigan Lake, British Columbia	Vancouver Comets
17		Taylor Girard	Sophomore	F	5' 10" (1.78 m)		Macomb, Michigan	Detroit Honeybaked
18		Lillian Marchant	Sophomore	F	5' 6" (1.68 m)		Tustin, California	Anaheim Lady Ducks
19		Hannah Alt	Freshman	F	5' 3" (1.6 m)		Belvidere, Illinois	Chicago Mission
20		Christiana von Aulock	Freshman	D	5' 6" (1.68 m)		Des Plaines, Illinois	Chicago Mission
21		Corbin Welsh	Junior	F	5' 5" (1.65 m)		Grand Prairie, Alberta	Pursuit of Excellence
22		Courtney Ganske (A)	Sophomore	F	5' 6" (1.68 m)		Killarney, Manitoba	Westman Wildcats
23		Shannon Morris-Reade (C)	Junior	F	5' 8" (1.73 m)		Port Coquitlam, British Columbia	Team British Columbia U18
26		Britainnia Gillanders (C)	Senior	F	5' 10" (1.78 m)		Kyle, Saskatchewan	Warner School
27		Carla Goodwin	Junior	F	5' 10" (1.78 m)		Fort St. James, British Columbia	Pursuit of Excellence
30		Jolene deBruyn	Junior	G	5' 9" (1.75 m)		Grande Prairie, Alberta	Team Alberta U18
31		Sarah McGall	Senior	G	5' 7" (1.7 m)		Owen Sound, Ontario	Ottawa Jr. Senators
39		Lauren Hennessey	Freshman	G	5' 8" (1.73 m)		Lynnfield, Massachusetts	Boston Jr. Shamrocks

== Schedule ==
Date	Opponent^{#}	Rank^{#}	Site	Decision	Result	Record
Regular Season
September 22	at #2 Wisconsin*		LaBahn Arena • Madison, WI	Jolene deBruyn	L 1–3	0–1–0
September 23	at #2 Wisconsin*		LaBahn Arena • Madison, WI	Jolene deBruyn	L 0–4	0–2–0
September 29	Minnesota State*		Lindenwood Ice Arena • Wentzville, MO	Jolene deBruyn	L 1–4	0–3–0
September 30	Minnesota State*		Lindenwood Ice Arena • Wentzville, MO	Jolene deBruyn	T 2–2 ^{OT}	0–3–1
October 13	Mercyhurst		Lindenwood Ice Arena • Wentzville, MO	Jolene deBruyn	W 3–2	1–3–1 (1–0–0)
October 14	Mercyhurst		Lindenwood Ice Arena • Wentzville, MO	Jolene deBruyn	L 1–6	1–4–1 (1–1–0)
October 27	at RIT		Gene Polisseni Center • Rochester, NY	Sarah McGall	L 3–4	1–5–1 (1–2–0)
October 28	at RIT		Gene Polisseni Center • Rochester, NY	Sarah McGall	W 6–0	2–5–1 (2–2–0)
November 3	#10 Robert Morris		Lindenwood Ice Arena • Wentzville, MO	Sarah McGall	L 0–6	2–6–1 (2–3–0)
November 4	#10 Robert Morris		Lindenwood Ice Arena • Wentzville, MO	Jolene deBruyn	L 2–4	2–7–1 (2–4–0)
November 25	#6 Minnesota*		Lindenwood Ice Arena • Wentzville, MO	Jolene deBruyn	L 1–3	2–8–1
November 26	#6 Minnesota*		Lindenwood Ice Arena • Wentzville, MO	Jolene deBruyn	L 3–4 ^{OT}	2–9–1
December 1	at Syracuse		Tennity Ice Skating Pavilion • Syracuse, NY	Jolene deBruyn	L 1–4	2–10–1 (2–5–0)
December 2	at Syracuse		Tennity Ice Skating Pavilion • Syracuse, NY	Jolene deBruyn	W 2–0	3–10–1 (3–5–0)
December 8	at Minnesota State*		Verizon Center • Mankato, MN	Jolene deBruyn	L 4–5	3–11–1
December 9	at Minnesota State*		Verizon Center • Mankato, MN	Jolene deBruyn	W 4–1	4–11–1
January 5, 2018	vs. #10 St. Lawrence*		Honda Center • Anaheim, CA (College Hockey Classic, Game 1)	Jolene deBruyn	W 5–4	5–11–1
January 6	vs. #10 St. Lawrence*		Honda Center • Anaheim, CA (College Hockey Classic, Game 2)	Jolene deBruyn	L 2–3 ^{OT}	5–12–1
January 12	Penn State		Lindenwood Ice Arena • Wentzville, MO	Jolene deBruyn	L 1–3	5–13–1 (3–6–0)
January 13	Penn State		Lindenwood Ice Arena • Wentzville, MO	Jolene deBruyn	W 4–1	6–13–1 (4–6–0)
January 19	Mercyhurst*		Mercyhurst Ice Center • Erie, PA	Jolene deBruyn	L 0–3	6–14–1 (4–7–0)
January 20	Mercyhurst*		Mercyhurst Ice Center • Erie, PA	Jolene deBruyn	L 1–5	6–15–1 (4–8–0)
January 26	RIT		Lindenwood Ice Arena • Wentzville, MO	Jolene deBruyn	W 4–1	7–15–1 (5–8–0)
January 27	RIT		Lindenwood Ice Arena • Wentzville, MO	Jolene deBruyn	W 3–1	8–15–1 (6–8–0)
February 9	at #10 Robert Morris		84 Lumber Arena • Neville Township, PA	Jolene deBruyn	L 0–1	8–16–1 (6–9–0)
February 10	at Robert Morris		84 Lumber Arena • Neville Township, PA	Lauren Hennessey	L 0–5	8–17–1 (6–10–0)
February 16	Syracuse		Lindenwood Ice Arena • Wentzville, MO	Jolene deBruyn	W 1–0	9–17–1 (7–10–1)
February 17	Syracuse		Lindenwood Ice Arena • Wentzville, MO	Sarah McGall	L 4–5	9–18–1 (7–11–0)
February 23	Penn State		Pegula Ice Arena • University Park, PA	Jolene deBruyn	W 1–0	10–18–1 (8–11–0)
February 24	Penn State		Pegula Ice Arena • University Park, PA	Lauren Hennessey	L 0–6	10–19–1 (8–12–0)
CHA Tournament
March 2	vs. Penn State*		HarborCenter • Buffalo, NY (Quarterfinal Game)	Jolene deBruyn	L 1–2	10–20–1
*Non-conference game. ^{#}Rankings from USCHO.com Poll.

== Awards and honors ==
Jolene deBruyn and Taylor Girard were named First Team CHA All-Stars, while Sierra Burt earned honors in the All-Rookie team.
