= 2017–18 Ohio State Buckeyes women's ice hockey season =

- Conference: WCHA
- Home ice: OSU Ice Rink

Record
- Overall: 2-0-0
- Home: 2-0-0
- Road: 0-0-0

Coaches and captains
- Head coach: Nadine Muzerall
- Assistant coaches: Milica McMillen
- Captain(s): Juliana Iafallo; Lauren Spring

The Ohio State Buckeyes women's ice hockey program represent the Ohio State University during the 2017-18 NCAA Division I women's ice hockey season.

== Roster ==
=== 2017–18 Buckeyes ===
No.	Nat.	Player	Class	Pos	Height	DoB	Hometown	Previous team
1		Maggie Cory	Freshman	G	5' 6" (1.68 m)		Lino Lakes, Minnesota	Madison Capitols
2		Elise Riemenshneider	Sophomore	D	5' 8" (1.73 m)		Rocky River, Ohio	Connecticut Southern Stars
4		Jacyn Reeves	Junior	F	5' 8" (1.73 m)		Holmen, Wisconsin	Union (ECAC)
5		Charly Dahlquist	Junior	D	5' 6" (1.68 m)		Eden Prairie, Minnesota	University of North Dakota
6		Lauren Boyle	Junior	D	5' 3" (1.6 m)		Eden Prairie, Minnesota	Eden Prairie HS
8		Dani Sadek	Senior	D	5' 9" (1.75 m)		Lakeville, Minnesota	Lakeville North HS
9		Liv Halvorson	Senior	D	5' 9" (1.75 m)		Richfield, Minnesota	Providence (Hockey East)
10		Erin Langermeier	Junior	F	5' 8" (1.73 m)		Westlake, Ohio	Connecticut South Stars
11		Tatum Skaggs	Freshman	F	5' 6" (1.68 m)		Hartland, Wisconsin	Chicago Mission
12		Maddy Field	Junior	F	5' 8" (1.73 m)		Oakville, Ontario	Oakville Jr. Hornets
14		Samantha Bouley	Sophomore	F	5' 4" (1.63 m)		Stittsville, Ontario	Nepean Jr. Wildcats
16		Rebecca Freiberger	Sophomore	F	5' 8" (1.73 m)		Rochester, Minnesota	Minnesota Ice Cats
17		Emma Maltais	Freshman	F	5' 4" (1.63 m)		Burlington, Ontario	Oakville Jr. Hornets
18		Julianna Iaffalo (C)	Senior	F	5' 8" (1.73 m)		Eden, New York	Buffalo Bison (WNYAHL)
19		Olivia Soares	Freshman	F	5' 10" (1.78 m)		Hanover, Massachusetts	Bay State Breakers
20		Katie Mikkelsen	Sophomore	D	6' 0" (1.83 m)		Oshawa, Ontario	Whitby Jr. Wolves
21		Liz Schepers	Freshman	F	5' 7" (1.7 m)		Mound, Minnesota	Mound Westonka HS
22		Lisa Bruno	Freshman	D	5' 5" (1.65 m)		Whitby, Ontario	Durham Jr. Lightning
23		McKenna Wesloh	Freshman	F	5' 8" (1.73 m)		Elk River, Minnesota	Minnesota Revolution
27		Lauren Spring (C)	Senior	F	5' 9" (1.75 m)		Kelowna, British Columbia	Pursuit of Excellence
31		Amanda Zeglen	Freshman	G	5' 8" (1.73 m)		Calgary, Alberta	Pursuit of Excellence
32		Kassidy Suave	Junior (RS)	G	5' 9" (1.75 m)		Whitby, Ontario	Whitby Wolves
33		Jincy Dunne	Sophomore (RS)	D	5' 6" (1.68 m)		O'Fallon, Missouri	St. Louis Lady Blues U19

== Standings ==
2017–18 Western Collegiate Hockey Association standings
	Conference								Overall					
	GP	W	L	T	SW	PTS	GF	GA	GP	W	L	T	GF	GA
#2 Wisconsin†	24	20	2	2	2	64	81	29	37	31	4	2	123	44
#6 Ohio State	24	14	6	4	3	49	63	51	38	24	10	4	112	76
#5 Minnesota*	24	13	8	3	0	42	74	54	38	24	11	3	119	79
Minnesota Duluth	24	10	11	3	2	35	49	62	35	15	16	4	71	82
Bemidji State	24	9	13	2	1	30	60	68	38	16	19	3	90	96
St. Cloud State	24	6	14	4	1	23	41	59	33	8	20	5	52	82
Minnesota State	24	3	21	0	0	9	37	82	34	5	28	1	57	123
Championship: March 4, 2018 † indicates conference regular season champion; * indicates conference tournament champion Rankings: USCHO.com

== 2017-18 schedule ==
Date	Opponent^{#}	Rank^{#}	Site	Decision	Result	Record
Regular Season
September 29	Rensselaer*		OSU Ice Rink • Columbus, OH	Kassidy Sauve	W 4–1	1–0–0
September 30	Rensselaer*		OSU Ice Rink • Columbus, OH	Kassidy Sauve	W 4–0	2–0–0
October 6	at Minnesota		Ridder Arena • Minnesota, MN			
October 7	at Minnesota		Ridder Arena • Minnesota, MN			
October 13	Minnesota-Duluth		OSU Ice Rink • Columbus, OH			
October 14	Minnesota-Duluth		OSU Ice Rink • Columbus, OH			
October 20	at St. Cloud State		Herb Brooks National Hockey Center • St. Cloud, MN			
October 21	at St. Cloud State		Herb Brooks National Hockey Center • St. Cloud, MN			
November 4	at Wisconsin		LaBahn Arena • Madison, WI			
November 5	at Wisconsin		LaBahn Arena • Madison, WI			
November 10	Minnesota State		OSU Ice Rink • Columbus, OH			
November 11	Minnesota State		OSU Ice Rink • Columbus, OH			
November 17	at Bemidji State		Sanford Center • Bemidji, MN			
November 18	at Bemidji State		Sanford Center • Bemidji, MN			
November 24	at Robert Morris*		84 Lumber Arena • Neville Township, PA			
November 25	at Robert Morris*		84 Lumber Arena • Neville Township, PA			
December 1	St. Cloud State		OSU Ice Rink • Columbus, OH			
December 2	St. Cloud State		OSU Ice Rink • Columbus, OH			
December 15	at Mercyhurst*		Mercyhurst Ice Center • Erie, PA			
December 16	at Mercyhurst*		Mercyhurst Ice Center • Erie, PA			
January 5, 2018	Penn State*		OSU Ice Rink • Columbus, OH			
January 6	Penn State*		OSU Ice Rink • Columbus, OH			
January 12	Robert Morris*		OSU Ice Rink • Columbus, OH			
January 13	Robert Morris*		OSU Ice Rink • Columbus, OH			
January 19	Minnesota		OSU Ice Rink • Columbus, OH			
January 20	Minnesota		OSU Ice Rink • Columbus, OH			
January 26	at Minnesota-Duluth		Amsoil Arena • Duluth, MN			
January 27	at Minnesota-Duluth		Amsoil Arena • Duluth, MN			
February 2	Wisconsin		OSU Ice Rink • Columbus, OH			
February 3	Wisconsin		OSU Ice Rink • Columbus, OH			
February 9	at Minnesota State		Verizon Wireless Center • Mankato, MN			
February 10	at Minnesota State		Verizon Wireless Center • Mankato, MN			
February 16	Bemidji State		OSU Ice Rink • Columbus, OH			
February 17	Bemidji State		OSU Ice Rink • Columbus, OH			
WCHA Tournament
February 23	TBD*		TBD • (Quarterfinals, Game 1)			
February 24	TBD*		TBD • (Quarterfinals, Game 2)			
*Non-conference game. ^{#}Rankings from USCHO.com Poll.

== Awards and honors ==
- Jincy Dunne, 2017-18 Second Team All-America
