= 2017–18 Bemidji State Beavers women's ice hockey season =

- Conference: 5th WCHA
- Home ice: Sanford Center

Record
- Overall: 16–19–3 (9–13–2 in conference play)
- Home: 7–8–3
- Road: 8–10–0
- Neutral: 1–1–0

Coaches and captains
- Head coach: James Scanlan
- Assistant coaches: Amber Fryklund; Shane Veenker
- Captain(s): Emma Terres; Summer Thibodeau
- Alternate captain: Erin Deters

The 2017–18 Bemidji State Beavers women's ice hockey season represented Bemidji State University during the 2017-18 NCAA Division I women's ice hockey season.

== Offseason ==
=== 2017–18 Beavers ===
No.	Nat.	Player	Class	Pos	Height	DoB	Hometown	Previous team
2		Mak Langei	Freshman	D	5' 5" (1.65 m)		East Grand Forks, Minnesota	Shattuck St. Mary's
3		Lydia Passolt	Freshman	F	5' 6" (1.68 m)		Chanhassen, Minnesota	Chanhassen HS
4		Kara Werth	Freshman	D	5' 7" (1.7 m)		Moorhead, Minnesota	Moorhead HS
5		Melissa Hunt	Junior	D	5' 6" (1.68 m)		Hartney, Manitoba	Westman Wildcats
6		Reilly Fawcett	Senior	F	5' 4" (1.63 m)		Proctor, Minnesota	Proctor/Hermantown HS
7		Abby Ecker	Freshman	D	5' 8" (1.73 m)		Grey Eagle, Minnesota	Long Prairie-Grey Eagle HS
8		Kiki Radke	Sophomore	F	5' 3" (1.6 m)		Hastings, Minnesota	Hastings HS
9		Emily Bergland	Junior	F	5' 6" (1.68 m)		Thief River Falls, Minnesota	Lincoln HS
10		Lindsey Featherstone	Freshman	F	5' 4" (1.63 m)		Woodbury, Minnesota	Hill Murray HS
11		Tina Kampa	Freshman	D	5' 0" (1.52 m)		Maple Grove, Minnesota	Maple Grove HS
12		Jacqueline Kaasa	Sophomore	F	5' 3" (1.6 m)		North Hudson, Wisconsin	Hill Murray HS
13		Sylvia Marolt	Junior	F	5' 5" (1.65 m)		Thief River Falls, Minnesota	Lincoln HS
14		Briana Jorde	Sophomore	D	5' 3" (1.6 m)		Thief River Falls, Minnesota	Lincoln HS
16		Bailey Wright	Senior	F	5' 6" (1.68 m)		Anchorage, Alaska	Minnesota Duluth (WCHA)
17		Emma Terres (C)	Senior	D	5' 8" (1.73 m)		New Hope, Minnesota	Armstrong-Cooper HS
18		Paige Beebe	Freshman	F	5' 7" (1.7 m)		Blaine, Minnesota	Blaine HS
19		Haley Mack	Sophomore	F	5' 3" (1.6 m)		East Grand Forks, Minnesota	Minnesota Revolution
20		Heather Olson	Sophomore	D	5' 7" (1.7 m)		Bemidji, Minnesota	Bemidji HS
21		Abby Halluska	Sophomore	F	5' 9" (1.75 m)		Delano, Minnesota	Buffalo HS
22		Alexis Joyce	Senior	D	5' 4" (1.63 m)		Lakeville, Minnesota	Lakeville North HS
24		Summer Thibodeau (C)	Senior	F	5' 7" (1.7 m)		Maple Grove, Minnesota	Maple Grove HS
26		Clair DeGeorge	Freshman	F	5' 10" (1.78 m)		Anchorage, Alaska	Shattuck St. Mary's
30		Erin Deters (A)	Senior	G	5' 7" (1.7 m)		Sartell, Minnesota	Sartell/Sauk Rapids HS
33		Kerigan Dowhy	Freshman	G	5' 6" (1.68 m)		The Pas, Manitoba	Interlake Lightning
35		Lauren Bench	Freshman (RS)	G	5' 10" (1.78 m)		Eagan, Minnesota	Burnsville HS

== Standings ==
2017–18 Western Collegiate Hockey Association standings
	Conference								Overall					
	GP	W	L	T	SW	PTS	GF	GA	GP	W	L	T	GF	GA
#2 Wisconsin†	24	20	2	2	2	64	81	29	37	31	4	2	123	44
#6 Ohio State	24	14	6	4	3	49	63	51	38	24	10	4	112	76
#5 Minnesota*	24	13	8	3	0	42	74	54	38	24	11	3	119	79
Minnesota Duluth	24	10	11	3	2	35	49	62	35	15	16	4	71	82
Bemidji State	24	9	13	2	1	30	60	68	38	16	19	3	90	96
St. Cloud State	24	6	14	4	1	23	41	59	33	8	20	5	52	82
Minnesota State	24	3	21	0	0	9	37	82	34	5	28	1	57	123
Championship: March 4, 2018 † indicates conference regular season champion; * indicates conference tournament champion Rankings: USCHO.com

== 2017–18 Schedule ==
Date	Opponent^{#}	Rank^{#}	Site	Decision	Result	Record
Regular Season
September 29	Syracuse*		Sanford Center • Bemidji, MN	Erin Deters	T 0–0 ^{OT}	0–0–1
September 30	Syracuse*		Sanford Center • Bemidji, MN	Lauren Bench	W 5–0	1–0–1
October 6	at #2 Clarkson*		Cheel Arena • Potsdam, NY	Erin Deters	L 0–2	1–1–1
October 7	at #2 Clarkson*		Cheel Arena • Potsdam, NY	Lauren Bench	L 4–5	1–2–1
October 13	#9 Minnesota		Sanford Center • Bemidji, MN	Erin Deters	L 1–3	1–3–1 (0–1–0)
October 14	#9 Minnesota		Sanford Center • Bemidji, MN	Lauren Bench	L 3–4 ^{OT}	1–4–1 (0–2–0)
October 20	at #1 Wisconsin		LaBahn Arena • Madison, WI	Erin Deters	L 1–5	1–5–1 (0–3–0)
October 22	at #1 Wisconsin		LaBahn Arena • Madison, WI	Lauren Bench	L 1–5	1–6–1 (0–4–0)
October 27	Minnesota Duluth		Sanford Center • Bemidji, MN	Erin Deters	L 2–3	1–7–1 (0–5–0)
October 28	Minnesota Duluth		Sanford Center • Bemidji, MN	Erin Deters	W 2–1	2–7–1 (1–5–0)
November 6	vs. Minnesota Duluth*		David C. Johnson Ice Arena • Cambridge, MN (US Hockey Hall of Fame Game)	Kerigan Dowhy	W 3–2	3–7–1
November 10	at St. Cloud State		Herb Brooks National Hockey Center • St. Cloud, MN	Erin Deters	W 3–0	4–7–1 (2–5–0)
November 11	at St. Cloud State		Herb Brooks National Hockey Center • St. Cloud, MN	Erin Deters	W 3–0	5–7–1 (3–5–0)
November 17	#5 Ohio State		Sanford Center • Bemidji, MN	Erin Deters	T 3–3 ^{OT}	5–7–2 (3–5–1)
November 18	#5 Ohio State		Sanford Center • Bemidji, MN	Erin Deters	L 4–5	5–8–2 (3–6–1)
November 22	at St. Cloud State*		Herb Brooks National Hockey Center • St. Cloud, MN	Erin Deters	L 0–4	5–9–2
December 1	at #6 Minnesota		Ridder Arena • Minneapolis, MN	Lauren Bench	L 2–3 ^{OT}	5–10–2 (3–7–1)
December 2	at #6 Minnesota		Ridder Arena • Minneapolis, MN	Lauren Bench	W 4–2	6–10–2 (4–7–1)
December 8	RIT*		Sanford Center • Bemidji, MN	Lauren Bench	W 5–2	7–10–2
December 9	RIT*		Sanford Center • Bemidji, MN	Kerigan Dowhy	W 3–1	8–10–2
December 15	Minnesota State		Sanford Center • Bemidji, MN	Lauren Bench	W 4–2	9–10–2 (5–7–1)
December 16	Minnesota State		Sanford Center • Bemidji, MN	Lauren Bench	W 5–0	10–10–2 (6–7–1)
January 2, 2018	Mercyhurst*		Sanford Center • Bemidji, MN	Lauren Bench	W 2–1 ^{OT}	11–10–2
January 3	Mercyhurst*		Sanford Center • Bemidji, MN	Erin Deters	L 1–2	11–11–2
January 12	at Minnesota Duluth		AMSOIL Arena • Duluth, MN	Lauren Bench	W 5–3	12–11–2 (7–7–1)
January 13	at Minnesota Duluth		AMSOIL Arena • Duluth, MN	Lauren Bench	L 2–3	12–12–2 (7–8–1)
January 19	#1 Wisconsin		Sanford Center • Bemidji, MN	Lauren Bench	L 3–4 ^{OT}	12–13–2 (7–9–1)
January 20	#1 Wisconsin		Sanford Center • Bemidji, MN	Kerigan Dowhy	T 3–3 ^{OT}	12–13–3 (7–9–2)
February 2	at Minnesota State		Verizon Wireless Center • Mankato, MN	Lauren Bench	L 1–3	12–14–3 (7–10–2)
February 3	at Minnesota State		Verizon Wireless Center • Mankato, MN	Lauren Bench	W 5–3	13–14–3 (8–10–2)
February 9	St. Cloud State		Sanford Center • Bemidji, MN	Lauren Bench	L 0–4	13–15–3 (8–11–2)
February 10	St. Cloud State		Sanford Center • Bemidji, MN	Erin Deters	L 1–4	13–16–3 (8–12–2)
February 16	at #6 Ohio State		OSU Ice Rink • Columbus, OH	Lauren Bench	L 0–4	13–17–3 (8–13–2)
February 17	at #6 Ohio State		OSU Ice Rink • Columbus, OH	Kerigan Dowhy	W 2–1	14–17–3 (9–13–2)
WCHA Tournament
February 23	at Minnesota Duluth*		AMSOIL Arena • Duluth, MN (Quarterfinals, Game 1)	Kerigan Dowhy	W 2–1	15–17–3
February 24	at Minnesota Duluth*		AMSOIL Arena • Duluth, MN (Quarterfinals, Game 2)	Kerigan Dowhy	L 1–4	15–18–3
February 25	at Minnesota Duluth*		AMSOIL Arena • Duluth, MN (Quarterfinals, Game 3)	Kerigan Dowhy	W 3–0	16–18–3
March 3	vs. #1 Wisconsin*		Ridder Arena • Minneapolis, MN (Semifinal Game)	Kerigan Dowhy	L 1–4	16–19–3
*Non-conference game. ^{#}Rankings from USCHO.com Poll.
