= 2018 CHA women's ice hockey tournament =

2018 College Hockey America women's ice hockey tournament
- Dates: March 1–3, 2018
- Teams: 6
- Finals site: Harborcenter; Buffalo, New York
- Champions: Mercyhurst (12th title)
- Winning coach: Michael Sisti (12th title)
- College Hockey America women's Ice Hockey Tournaments

The 2018 College Hockey America Women's Ice Hockey Tournament was the 16th tournament in league history played between March 1 and March 3, 2018, at the Harborcenter in Buffalo, New York. Mercyhurst won their 12th tournament and earned College Hockey America's automatic bid to the 2018 NCAA National Collegiate Women's Ice Hockey Tournament.

== Format ==
All six CHA Teams participated in the Tournament. On the first day of the Tournament, the top two seeds received a bye, while the #3 seed played the #6 seed, and the #4 seed played the #5 seed in the Quarterfinal round. On the second day, the Semifinal games featured the #1 seed against the lowest remaining seed, while the #2 seed played the highest remaining seed. On the third and final day, the CHA Championship was played between the two Semifinal winners. There was a total of five games.

=== Standings ===
2017–18 College Hockey America standings
	Conference							Overall					
	GP	W	L	T	PTS	GF	GA	GP	W	L	T	GF	GA
#10 Robert Morris†	20	14	3	3	31	75	30	33	21	8	4	122	70
Mercyhurst*	20	13	4	3	29	58	24	37	18	15	4	94	74
Syracuse	20	11	8	1	23	53	43	36	13	21	2	76	98
Penn State	20	6	7	7	19	43	36	36	10	15	11	65	69
Lindenwood	20	8	12	0	16	37	57	31	10	20	1	61	92
RIT	20	1	19	0	2	19	95	35	4	28	3	42	141
Championship: † indicates conference regular season champion; * indicates conference tournament champion Rankings: USCHO.com

- Rankings based on number of wins in the conference

Round	Match	Name	Team 1		Team 2
1	March 1	Quarterfinal 1 (#3 v. #6)	Syracuse 5	v	RIT 1
2	March 1	Quarterfinal 2 (#4 v. #5)	Penn State 2	v	Lindenwood 1
3	March 2	Semifinal 1 (#1 v. #4)	Robert Morris 7	v	Penn State 2
4	March 2	Semifinal 2 (#2 v. #3)	Mercyhurst 3	v	Syracuse 2*
5	March 3	Championship Game	Robert Morris 3	v	Mercyhurst 5

Tournament Champion: Mercyhurst

Note: * denotes overtime period(s)

Mercyhurst Forward Emma Nuutinen was named the Tournament MVP

The Tournament Champion earned a berth in the 2018 NCAA National Collegiate Women's Ice Hockey Tournament to determine the national champion. The Mercyhurst Lakers were the number 8 seed out of 8 in the tournament, and lost to #1 seed Clarkson 3–2 in overtime on March 10, in Potsdam, New York.
