= 2017–18 Mercyhurst Lakers women's ice hockey season =

CHA Tournament Champions Quarterfinal v. #1 Clarkson, Lost 3-2 (OT)
- Conference: 2nd College Hockey America
- Home ice: Mercyhurst Ice Center

Record
- Overall: 18-15-4
- Conference: 13-4-3
- Home: 9-6-3
- Road: 7-9-1
- Neutral: 2-0-0

Coaches and captains
- Head coach: Michael Sisti (19th season)
- Assistant coaches: Louis Goulet; Kelley Steadman
- Captain: Jennifer MacAskill
- Alternate captain(s): Brooke Hartwick; Callie Paddock; Morgan Stacey

The Mercyhurst Lakers represented Mercyhurst University in CHA women's ice hockey during the 2017-18 NCAA Division I women's ice hockey season.

== Standings ==
2017–18 College Hockey America standings
	Conference							Overall					
	GP	W	L	T	PTS	GF	GA	GP	W	L	T	GF	GA
#10 Robert Morris†	20	14	3	3	31	75	30	33	21	8	4	122	70
Mercyhurst*	20	13	4	3	29	58	24	37	18	15	4	94	74
Syracuse	20	11	8	1	23	53	43	36	13	21	2	76	98
Penn State	20	6	7	7	19	43	36	36	10	15	11	65	69
Lindenwood	20	8	12	0	16	37	57	31	10	20	1	61	92
RIT	20	1	19	0	2	19	95	35	4	28	3	42	141
Championship: † indicates conference regular season champion; * indicates conference tournament champion Rankings: USCHO.com

- Rankings based on number of wins in the conference

== Roster ==
2017–18 Mercyhurst Lakers

No.	Nat.	Player	Class	Pos	Height	DoB	Hometown	Previous team
1		Leah Klassen	Freshman	G	5' 4" (1.63 m)		Niagara-on-the-Lake, Ontario	Westminster School
2		Samantha Fieseler	Junior (RS)	D	5' 6" (1.68 m)		Kelowna, British Columbia	Pursuit of Excellence Academy
4		Maggie Knott	Sophomore	F	5' 11" (1.8 m)		Smith Falls, Ontario	Ottawa Jr. Lady Senators
5		Sam Isbell	Sophomore	F	5' 7" (1.7 m)		Thunder Bay, Ontario	Whitby Jr. Wolves
6		K.K Thiessen	Freshman	D	5' 8" (1.73 m)		Winnipeg, Manitoba	Team Manitoba
7		Summer-Rae Dobson	Freshman	F	5' 5" (1.65 m)		Huntsville, Ontario	Ridley Tigers
8		Molly Blasen	Junior	D	5' 7" (1.7 m)		Okemos, Michigan	Honeybaked
10		Alexa Vasko	Freshman	F	5' 5" (1.65 m)		St. Catharines, Ontario	Stoney Creek Sabres
11		Jennifer MacAskill (C)	Senior	F	5' 5" (1.65 m)		Auld's Cove, Nova Scotia	Oakville Jr. Hornets
12		Megan Korzack	Freshman	F	5' 2" (1.57 m)		Grimsby, Ontario	Stoney Creek Sabres
13		Claire Werynski	Sophomore	D	5' 7" (1.7 m)		Williamsville, New York	Gilmour Academy
14		Vilma Tanskanen	Junior	F	5' 9" (1.75 m)		Vantaa, Finland	Finnish National Team
15		Rachel Marmen	Freshman	D	5' 5" (1.65 m)		Oakville, Ontario	LStoney Creek Sabres
16		Michele Robillard	Sophomore	F	5' 7" (1.7 m)		Orchard Park, New York	Nichols School
18		Nicole Guagliardo	Sophomore	F	5' 8" (1.73 m)		Hoffman Estates, Illinois	Barrington HS
19		Sarah Robello	Senior	F	5' 4" (1.63 m)		Las Vegas, Nevada	Boston Shamrocks
20		Emma Nuutinen	Sophomore	F	5' 9" (1.75 m)		Vantaa, Finland	Finnish National Team
21		Callie Paddock (A)	Senior	D	6' 1" (1.85 m)		Wawa, Ontario	St. Mary's Academy
22		Nicole Collier	Junior	D	5' 6" (1.68 m)		Oakville, Ontario	Stoney Creek Sabres
23		Morgan Stacey (A)	Junior	F	5' 5" (1.65 m)		Commerce Township, Michigan	Honeybaked
24		Celine Frappier	Sophomore	F	5' 4" (1.63 m)		Tecumseh, Ontario	Toronto Jr. Aeros
26		Sarah Hine	Junior	F	5' 4" (1.63 m)		Hamilton, Ontario	Stoney Creek Sabres
27		Brooke Hartwick (A)	Senior	F	5' 7" (1.7 m)		London, Ontario	Brampton Jr. Canadettes
29		Kennedy Blair	Freshman (RS)	G	5' 6" (1.68 m)		Bismarck, North Dakota	Minnesota Revolution
30		Sarah McDonnell	Junior	G	5' 5" (1.65 m)		Oakville, Ontario	Stoney Creek Sabres

== Schedule ==
Date	Opponent^{#}	Rank^{#}	Site	Decision	Result	Record
Regular Season
September 28	at #2 Wisconsin*		LaBahn Arena • Madison, WI	Kennedy Blair	L 0-4	0–1–0
September 29	at #2 Wisconsin*		LaBahn Arena • Madison, WI	Sarah McDonnell	L 1-5	0–2–0
October 6	#6 St. Lawrence*		Mercyhurst Ice Center • Erie, PA	Kennedy Blair	L 1-4	0–3–0
October 7	#6 St. Lawrence*		Mercyhurst Ice Center • Erie, PA	Sarah McDonnell	T 1-1 ^{OT}	0–3–1
October 13	at Lindenwood		Lindenwood Ice Arena • Wentzville, MO	Sarah McDonnell	L 2-3	0–4–1 (0–1–0)
October 14	at Lindenwood		Lindenwood Ice Arena • Wentzville, MO	Kennedy Blair	W 6-1	1–4–1 (1–1–0)
October 20	at #5 Colgate*		Class of 1965 Arena • Hamilton, NY	Kennedy Blair	L 3-4 ^{OT}	1–5–1
October 21	at #5 Colgate*		Class of 1965 Arena • Hamilton, NY	Sarah McDonnell	L 1-4	1–6–1
November 3	at Penn State		Pegula Ice Arena • University Park, PA	Sarah McDonnell	W 3-1	2–6–1 (2–1–0)
November 4	at Penn State		Pegula Ice Arena • University Park, PA	Sarah McDonnell	T 1-1 ^{OT}	2–6–2 (2–1–1)
November 10	#6 Minnesota*		Mercyhurst Ice Center • Erie, PA	Sarah McDonnell	L 1-2 ^{OT}	2–7–2
November 11	#6 Minnesota*		Mercyhurst Ice Center • Erie, PA	Sarah McDonnell	L 2-5	2–8–2
November 24	Rensselaer*		Mercyhurst Ice Center • Erie, PA	Sarah McDonnell	W 4-1	3–8–2
November 25	Rensselaer*		Mercyhurst Ice Center • Erie, PA	Sarah McDonnell	L 3-4	3–9–2
December 1	at #9 Robert Morris		84 Lumber Arena • Neville Township, PA	Kennedy Blair	W 1-0	4–9–2 (3–1–1)
December 2	at #9 Robert Morris		84 Lumber Arena • Neville Township, PA	Kennedy Blair	L 1-2	4–10–2 (3–2–1)
December 8	Syracuse		Mercyhurst Ice Center • Erie, PA	Kennedy Blair	W 4-1	5–10–2 (4–2–1)
December 9	Syracuse		Mercyhurst Ice Center • Erie, PA	Kennedy Blair	W 2-1 ^{OT}	6–10–2 (5–2–1)
December 15	#7 Ohio State*		Mercyhurst Ice Center • Erie, PA	Kennedy Blair	L 1-2	6–11–2
December 16	#7 Ohio State*		Mercyhurst Ice Center • Erie, PA	Sarah McDonnell	W 6-4	7–11–2
January 2, 2018	at Bemidji State*		Sanford Center • Bemidji, MN	Kennedy Blair	L 1-2 ^{OT}	7–12–2
January 3	at Bemidji State*		Sanford Center • Bemidji, MN	Sarah McDonnell	W 2-1	8–12–2
January 12	RIT		Mercyhurst Ice Center • Erie, PA	Kennedy Blair	W 7-2	9–12–2 (6–2–1)
January 13	RIT		Mercyhurst Ice Center • Erie, PA	Sarah McDonnell	W 4-0	10–12–2 (7–2–1)
January 19	Lindenwood		Mercyhurst Ice Center • Erie, PA	Sarah McDonnell	W 3-0	11–12–2 (8–2–1)
January 20	Lindenwood		Mercyhurst Ice Center • Erie, PA	Sarah McDonnell	W 5-1	12–12–2 (9–2–1)
January 26	at Syracuse		Tennity Ice Skating Pavilion • Syracuse, NY	Sarah McDonnell	L 1-4	12–13–2 (9–3–1)
January 27	at Syracuse		Tennity Ice Skating Pavilion • Syracuse, NY	Kennedy Blair	W 4-0	13–13–2 (10–3–1)
February 9	Penn State		Mercyhurst Ice Center • Erie, PA	Kennedy Blair	T 1-1 ^{OT}	13–13–3 (10–3–2)
February 10	Penn State		Mercyhurst Ice Center • Erie, PA	Sarah McDonnell	T 3-3 ^{OT}	13–13–4 (10–3–3)
February 16	Robert Morris		Mercyhurst Ice Center • Erie, PA	Kennedy Blair	W 2-0	14–13–4 (11–3–3)
February 17	Robert Morris		Mercyhurst Ice Center • Erie, PA	Kennedy Blair	L 2-3	14–14–4 (11–4–3)
February 23	at RIT		Gene Polisseni Center • Rochester, NY	Kennedy Blair	W 3-0	15–14–4 (12–4–3)
February 24	at RIT		Gene Polisseni Center • Rochester, NY	Kennedy Blair	W 3-0	16–14–4 (13–4–3)
CHA Tournament
March 2	vs. Syracuse*		HarborCenter • Buffalo, NY (Semifinal Game)	Kennedy Blair	W 3-2 ^{OT}	17–14–4
March 3	vs. #9 Robert Morris*		HarborCenter • Buffalo, NY (CHA Championship Game)	Kennedy Blair	W 5-3	18–14–4
NCAA Tournament
March 10	at Clarkson*		Cheel Arena • Potsdam, NY (NCAA Tournament, Quarterfinal)	Kennedy Blair	L 3-2 ^{OT}	18–15–4
*Non-conference game. ^{#}Rankings from USCHO.com Poll.

Source for schedule:

== Awards and honors ==
Vilma Tanskanen was named to the CHA All-Conference First Team. Maggie Knott was named to the Second All-Conference Team. Goaltender Kennedy Blair was named an All-Conference Rookie and won the CHA Goaltender Trophy. Michael Sisti was awarded the CHA Coach of the Year award, as well as one of seven finalists for the NCAA Coach of the Year laurels.
