= 2017–18 Minnesota Duluth Bulldogs women's ice hockey season =

- Conference: WCHA
- Home ice: Amsoil Arena

Record
- Overall: 0–0–0
- Home: 0–0–0
- Road: 0–0–0

Coaches and captains
- Head coach: Maura Crowell
- Assistant coaches: Laura Bellamy; Chris Connoly
- Captain: Sydney Brodt
- Alternate captain(s): Catherine Daoust; Jessica Healey; Linnea Hedin

The Minnesota Duluth Bulldogs represent the University of Minnesota Duluth in WCHA women's ice hockey during the 2017-18 NCAA Division I women's ice hockey season.

== Offseason ==
- May 5: Junior Goaltender Maddie Rooney has been chosen to the 2017-18 US National Team, in preparation for the 2018 Winter Olympics in Korea. Rooney will miss the 2017-18 Minnesota-Duluth season to fulfill her Olympic commitment. She is the youngest player chosen for Team USA.

=== Recruiting ===
Player	Position	Nationality	Notes
Monique Aanenson	Forward	United States	Attended North American Hockey Academy
Lindsay Czech	Defense	United States	Played with Team USA U18
Mallory Iozzo	Forward	United States	Played with Team USA U18
Anna Klein	Forward	United States	Attended Edina High School
Hannah Markel	Goaltender	United States	Played for Northwood
Megan Pardy	Forward	Canada	Played for Toronto Leaside
McKenzie Revering	Defense	United States	Chosen to USA U-18 Development Camp
Alison Rogers	Forward	United States	Attended North American Hockey Academy
Naome Rogge	Forward	United States	Attended Eden Prairie HS with Anna Klein

== Standings ==
2017–18 Western Collegiate Hockey Association standings
	Conference								Overall					
	GP	W	L	T	SW	PTS	GF	GA	GP	W	L	T	GF	GA
#2 Wisconsin†	24	20	2	2	2	64	81	29	37	31	4	2	123	44
#6 Ohio State	24	14	6	4	3	49	63	51	38	24	10	4	112	76
#5 Minnesota*	24	13	8	3	0	42	74	54	38	24	11	3	119	79
Minnesota Duluth	24	10	11	3	2	35	49	62	35	15	16	4	71	82
Bemidji State	24	9	13	2	1	30	60	68	38	16	19	3	90	96
St. Cloud State	24	6	14	4	1	23	41	59	33	8	20	5	52	82
Minnesota State	24	3	21	0	0	9	37	82	34	5	28	1	57	123
Championship: March 4, 2018 † indicates conference regular season champion; * indicates conference tournament champion Rankings: USCHO.com

== 2017-18 Bulldogs Schedule ==
Date	Opponent^{#}	Rank^{#}	Site	Decision	Result	Record
Regular Season
September 29	Penn State*		Amsoil Arena • Duluth, MN		0–0–0	
September 30	Penn State*		Amsoil Arena • Duluth, MN			
October 5	at Boston College*		Kelley Rink • Chestnut Hill, MA			
October 5	at Boston College*		Kelley Rink • Chestnut Hill, MA			
October 13	at Ohio State		OSU Ice Rink • Columbus, OH			
October 14	at Ohio State		OSU Ice Rink • Columbus, OH			
October 20	Minnesota		Amsoil Arena • Duluth, MN			
October 21	Minnesota		Amsoil Arena • Duluth, MN			
October 27	at Bemidji State		Sanford Center • Bemidji, MN			
October 28	at Bemidji State		Sanford Center • Bemidji, MN			
November 3	St. Cloud State		Amsoil Arena • Duluth, MN			
November 4	St. Cloud State		Amsoil Arena • Duluth, MN			
November 6	vs. Bemidji State*		Isanti Ice Arena • Cambridge, MN (US Hockey Hall of Fame Game)			
November 17	Minnesota State		Amsoil Arena • Duluth, MN			
November 18	Minnesota State		Amsoil Arena • Duluth, MN			
November 24	at Vermont*		Gutterson Fieldhouse • Burlington, VT (Windjammer Classic, Opening Game)			
November 25	vs. TBD*		Gutterson Fieldhouse • Burlington, VT (Windjammer Classic)			
December 1	at Wisconsin		LaBahn Arena • Madison, WI			
December 2	at Wisconsin		LaBahn Arena • Madison, WI			
December 8	at Minnesota		Ridder Arena • Minneapolis, MN			
December 9	at Minnesota		Ridder Arena • Minneapolis, MN			
January 12, 2018	Bemidji State		Amsoil Arena • Duluth, MN			
January 13	Bemidji State		Amsoil Arena • Duluth, MN			
January 19	at St. Cloud State		Herb Brooks National Hockey Center • St. Cloud, MN			
January 20	at St. Cloud State		Herb Brooks National Hockey Center • St. Cloud, MN			
January 26	Ohio State		Amsoil Arena • Duluth, MN			
January 27	Ohio State		Amsoil Arena • Duluth, MN			
February 9	Wisconsin		Amsoil Arena • Duluth, MN			
February 10	Wisconsin		Amsoil Arena • Duluth, MN			
February 16	at Minnesota State		Verizon Wireless Center • Mankato, MN			
February 17	at Minnesota State		Verizon Wireless Center • Mankato, MN			
WCHA Tournament
February 23	TBD		TBD • TBD (Quarterfinals, Game 1)			
February 24	TBD		TBD • TBD (Quarterfinals, Game 2)			
*Non-conference game. ^{#}Rankings from USCHO.com Poll.
