= 2017–18 RIT Tigers women's ice hockey season =

Hockey season representing Rochester Institute of Technology

- Conference: CHA
- Home ice: Gene Polisseni Center, Rochester, NY

Record
- Overall: 4–28–3
- Conference: 1–19–0
- Home: 2–12–0
- Road: 2–14–3
- Neutral: 0–2–0

Coaches and captains
- Head coach: Scott McDonald (12th season)
- Assistant coaches: Melissa Piacentini; Shane Madolora
- Captain(s): Lauren Carroll; Kendall Cornine
- Alternate captain(s): Mallory Rushton; Christa Vuglar

The RIT Tigers represented the Rochester Institute of Technology in College Hockey America during the 2017-18 NCAA Division I women's ice hockey season.

== Offseason ==
=== Recruiting ===
Player	Position	Nationality	Notes
Britteny Gout	Forward	Canada	Jordan Marchese's teammate on the Brampton Canadettes
Stella Haberman	Forward	United States	Played for Minnesota Jr. Whitecaps
Kaelyn Johnson	Forward	Canada	Played with the Mississauga Jr. Chiefs
Jordan Marchese	Forward	Canada	Member of the Brampton Canadettes
Baylee Trani	Forward	United States	Former member of New England Hockey Club
Katie Carlson	Defense	United States	Blueliner for Minnesota Revolution
Ellie Larson	Defense	United States	Attended Hutchinson HS in Minnesota
Jessi O'Leary	Goaltender	Canada	Member of Team New Brunswick

== Standings ==
2017–18 College Hockey America standings
	Conference							Overall					
	GP	W	L	T	PTS	GF	GA	GP	W	L	T	GF	GA
#10 Robert Morris†	20	14	3	3	31	75	30	33	21	8	4	122	70
Mercyhurst*	20	13	4	3	29	58	24	37	18	15	4	94	74
Syracuse	20	11	8	1	23	53	43	36	13	21	2	76	98
Penn State	20	6	7	7	19	43	36	36	10	15	11	65	69
Lindenwood	20	8	12	0	16	37	57	31	10	20	1	61	92
RIT	20	1	19	0	2	19	95	35	4	28	3	42	141
Championship: † indicates conference regular season champion; * indicates conference tournament champion Rankings: USCHO.com

- Rankings based on number of wins in the conference

== 2017–18 Tigers ==
No.	Nat.	Player	Class	Pos	Height	DoB	Hometown	Previous team
6		Stella Haberman	Freshman	F	5' 3" (1.6 m)		Golden Valley, Minnesota	Minnesota Whitecaps
7		Brooke Baker	Junior	F	5' 8" (1.73 m)		Saline, Michigan	Niagara Jr. Purple Eagles
8		Madison Farrand	Sophomore	F	5' 4" (1.63 m)		Potomac, Maryland	Washington Pride
9		Brittney Gout	Freshman	F	5' 3" (1.6 m)		Caledon, Ontario	Brampton Canadettes
10		Kendall Cornine (C)	Junior	F	5' 5" (1.65 m)		Kinnelon, New Jersey	East Coast Wizards
11		Christa Vuglar (A)	Junior	D	5' 3" (1.6 m)		Crystal Lake, Illinois	Chicago Mission
13		Darcy Henderson	Senior	F	5' 7" (1.7 m)		Burlington, Ontario	Burlington Barracudas
14		Ellie Larson	Freshman	D	5' 9" (1.75 m)		Hutchinson, Minnesota	Hutchinson HS
15		Kandice Sheriff	Junior	F	5' 9" (1.75 m)		Brampton, Ontario	Leaside Wildcats
16		Claudia Black	Sophomore	F	5' 5" (1.65 m)		Newmarket, Ontario	Toronto Jr. Aeros
17		Taylor Baker	Sophomore	F	5' 4" (1.63 m)		Toronto, Ontario	Toronto Jr. Aeros
19		Lauren Carroll (C)	Senior	D	5' 10" (1.78 m)		Carlisle, Ontario	Oakville Hornets
20		Mallory Rushton (A)	Junior	F	5' 2" (1.57 m)		Amherst, Nova Scotia	New Hampton Prep
21		Logan Land	Junior	F	5' 7" (1.7 m)		Turkey Point, Ontario	Burlington Barracudas
22		Jordan Marchese	Freshman	F	5' 5" (1.65 m)		Mississauga, Ontario	Brampton Canadettes
23		Brinna Dochniak	Junior	F	5' 5" (1.65 m)		Marine on St. Croix, Minnesota	Stillwater Ponies
24		Kathryn Kennedy	Junior	F	5' 5" (1.65 m)		Hamilton, Ontario	Hamilton Hawks
26		Baylee Trani	Freshman	F	5' 2" (1.57 m)		Huntington Beach, California	New England Hockey Club
27		Tori Haywood	Sophomore	F	5' 3" (1.6 m)		Pickering, Ontario	Toronto Jr. Aeros
28		Jade Mancini	Sophomore	F	5' 8" (1.73 m)		Burlington, Ontario	Burlington Jr. Barracudas
30		Jessi O'Leary	Freshman	G	5' 4" (1.63 m)		Woodstock, New Brunswick	Team New Brunswick
31		Jenna de Jonge	Junior	G	5' 10" (1.78 m)		Abbotsford, British Columbia	Pursuit of Excellence
35		Terra Lanteigne	Sophomore	G	5' 8" (1.73 m)		Hatchet Lake, Nova Scotia	Metro Boston Pizza

== 2017–18 Schedule ==
Date	Opponent^{#}	Rank^{#}	Site	Decision	Result	Record
Regular Season
October 6	at Holy Cross*		Hart Center • Worcester, MA	Jessi O'Leary	T 2-2 ^{OT}	0–0–1
October 7	at Holy Cross*		Hart Center • Worcester, MA	Jessi O'Leary	W 3-2	1–0–1
October 13	Rensselaer*		Gene Polisseni Center • Rochester, NY	Jessi O'Leary	L 1-3	1–1–1
October 14	Rensselaer*		Gene Polisseni Center • Rochester, NY	Jessi O'Leary	L 1-4	1–2–1
October 20	Yale*		Gene Polisseni Center • Rochester, NY	Jessi O'Leary	L 1-3	1–3–1
October 21	Yale*		Gene Polisseni Center • Rochester, NY	Terra Lanteigne	W 2-1 ^{OT}	2–3–1
October 27	Lindenwood		Gene Polisseni Center • Rochester, NY	Terra Lanteigne	W 4-3	3–3–1 (1–0–0)
October 28	Lindenwood		Gene Polisseni Center • Rochester, NY	Terra Lanteigne	L 0-6	3–4–1 (1–1–0)
November 3	at Boston University*		Walter Brown Arena • Boston, MA	Jessi O'Leary	L 1-5	3–5–1
November 4	at Boston University*		Walter Brown Arena • Boston, MA	Terra Lanteigne	W 2-1 ^{OT}	4–5–1
November 10	at #10 Robert Morris		84 Lumber Arena • Neville Township, PA	Terra Lanteigne	L 1-6	4–6–1 (1–2–0)
November 11	at #10 Robert Morris		84 Lumber Arena • Neville Township, PA	Terra Lanteigne	L 2-5	4–7–1 (1–3–0)
November 17	Syracuse		Gene Polisseni Center • Rochester, NY	Terra Lanteigne	L 1-4	4–8–1 (1–4–0)
November 18	at Syracuse		Tennity Ice Skating Pavilion • Syracuse, NY	Terra Lanteigne	L 1-5	4–9–1 (1–5–0)
November 24	at Vermont*		Gutterson Fieldhouse • Burlington, VT (Windjammer Classic, Opening Round)	Terra Lanteigne	T 1-1 ^{OT}	4–9–2
November 25	vs. #2 Colgate*		Gutterson Fieldhouse • Burlington, VT (Windjammer Classic, Consolation round)	Jenna de Jonge	L 1-6	4–10–2
December 1	Penn State		Gene Polisseni Center • Rochester, NY	Terra Lanteigne	L 0-5	4–11–2 (1–6–0)
December 2	Penn State		Gene Polisseni Center • Rochester, NY	Terra Lanteigne	L 0-2	4–12–2 (1–7–0)
December 8	at Bemidji State*		Sanford Center • Bemidji, MN	Terra Lanteigne	L 2-5	4–13–2
December 9	at Bemidji State*		Sanford Center • Bemidji, MN	Terra Lanteigne	L 1-3	4–14–2
December 15	at Union*		Achilles Center • Schenectady, NY	Terra Lanteigne	T 3-3 ^{OT}	4–14–3
December 16	at Union*		Achilles Center • Schenectady, NY	Terra Lanteigne	L 1-2	4–15–3
January 12, 2018	at Mercyhurst		Mercyhurst Ice Center • Erie, PA	Terra Lanteigne	L 2-7	4–16–3 (1–8–0)
January 13	at Mercyhurst		Mercyhurst Ice Center • Erie, PA	Jenna de Jonge	L 0-4	4–17–3 (1–9–0)
January 19	Robert Morris		Gene Polisseni Center • Rochester, NY	Jenna de Jonge	L 1-12	4–18–3 (1–10–0)
January 20	Robert Morris		Gene Polisseni Center • Rochester, NY	Terra Lanteigne	L 3-4 ^{OT}	4–19–3 (1–11–0)
January 26	at Lindenwood		Lindenwood Ice Arena • Wentzville, MO	Terra Lanteigne	L 1-4	4–20–3 (1–12–0)
January 27	at Lindenwood		Lindenwood Ice Arena • Wentzville, MO	Jessi O'Leary	L 1-3	4–21–3 (1–13–0)
February 9	at Syracuse		Tennity Ice Skating Pavilion • Syracuse, NY	Jessi O'Leary	L 1-7	4–22–3 (1–14–0)
February 10	Syracuse		Gene Polissei Center • Rochester, NY	Jenna de Jonge	L 0-6	4–23–3 (1–15–0)
February 16	at Penn State		Pegula Ice Arena • University Park, PA	Jenna de Jonge	L 1-4	4–24–3 (1–16–0)
February 17	at Penn State		Pegula Ice Arena • University Park, PA	Jenna de Jonge	L 0-2	4–25–3 (1–17–0)
February 23	Mercyhurst		Gene Polisseni Center • Rochester, NY	Jenna de Jonge	L 0-3	4–26–3 (1–18–0)
February 24	Mercyhurst		Gene Polisseni Center • Rochester, NY	Jenna de Jonge	L 0-3	4–27–3 (1–19–0)
CHA Tournament
March 1	vs. Syracuse*		HarborCenter • Buffalo, NY (Quarterfinal Game)	Jenna de Jonge	L 1-5	4–28–3
*Non-conference game. ^{#}Rankings from USCHO.com Poll.
