= 2017–18 Minnesota Golden Gophers women's ice hockey season =

WCHA Final Face-Off Champions 2018 NCAA tournament, Lost in Quarterfinals 0–4 to Wisconsin
- Conference: WCHA
- Home ice: Ridder Arena

Record
- Overall: 24–11–3
- Home: 13–6–2
- Road: 11–5–1

Coaches and captains
- Head coach: Brad Frost
- Assistant coaches: Joel Johnson; Bethany Brausen
- Captain(s): Sydney Baldwin; Cara Piazza

The 2017–18 Minnesota Golden Gophers women's ice hockey season represented the University of Minnesota during the 2017–18 NCAA Division I women's ice hockey season. They were coached by Brad Frost in his 11th season.

Following a Frozen Four appearance in March, the Golden Gophers were well represented in both international play and Olympic preparations. The April IIHF World Championships featured an impressive 10 alumni and current players from the team. Six players represented the US team including Lee Stecklein and 5 alumni. Of the two Canadians, current player Sarah Potomak made her country's team. Two alumni represented Finland to round out the ten. All of the Golden Gophers left the tournament with a medal, with the US taking gold, Canada silver, and Finland bronze.

In May, Countries began the 2018 Olympic selections. The 2017–18 US Team includes six Minnesota alumni, and Lee Stecklein. This will be Stecklein's second Olympic Games. A week after the US announced their team, Team Canada completed their Centralization roster, choosing Sarah Potomak, and her sister Amy Potomak. Of the 28 selected, 23 will be chosen to represent Canada at the Olympics

== Recruiting ==
Player	Position	Nationality	Notes
Emily Brown	Defense	United States	Member of Team USA U18
Alex Gulstene	Goaltender	Canada	Attended Okanagan Hockey Academy
Olivia Knowles	Defense	Canada	Played for Team Canada U18
Amy Potomak	Forward	Canada	Named Team Canada's Centralization roster
Taylor Wente	Forward	United States	Member of Team USA U18
Grace Zumwinkle	Forward	United States	One of 3 recruits from Team USA U18

== Regular season ==
=== Standings ===
2017–18 Western Collegiate Hockey Association standings
	Conference								Overall					
	GP	W	L	T	SW	PTS	GF	GA	GP	W	L	T	GF	GA
#2 Wisconsin†	24	20	2	2	2	64	81	29	37	31	4	2	123	44
#6 Ohio State	24	14	6	4	3	49	63	51	38	24	10	4	112	76
#5 Minnesota*	24	13	8	3	0	42	74	54	38	24	11	3	119	79
Minnesota Duluth	24	10	11	3	2	35	49	62	35	15	16	4	71	82
Bemidji State	24	9	13	2	1	30	60	68	38	16	19	3	90	96
St. Cloud State	24	6	14	4	1	23	41	59	33	8	20	5	52	82
Minnesota State	24	3	21	0	0	9	37	82	34	5	28	1	57	123
Championship: March 4, 2018 † indicates conference regular season champion; * indicates conference tournament champion Rankings: USCHO.com

=== Schedule ===
Date	Time	Opponent^{#}	Rank^{#}	Site	Decision	Result	Attendance	Record
Regular Season
September 29	7:07	Merrimack*	#3	Ridder Arena • Minneapolis, MN	Peters	L 3–4	1,171	0–1–0 (0–0–0)
October 1	2:07	Merrimack*	#3	Ridder Arena • Minneapolis, MN	Gulstene	W 4–1	1,047	1–1–0 (0–0–0)
October 6	7:07	Ohio State	#4	Ridder Arena • Minneapolis, MN	Gulstene	L 2–3	1,670	1–2–0 (0–1–0)
October 7	3:07	Ohio State	#4	Ridder Arena • Minneapolis, MN	Gulstene	T 5–5 ^{OT}	1,356	1–2–1 (0–1–1)
October 13	3:07	at Bemidji State	#9	Sanford Center • Bemidji, MN	Peters	W 3–1	321	2–2–1 (1–1–1)
October 14	3:07	at Bemidji State	#9	Sanford Center • Bemidji, MN	Peters	W 4–3 ^{OT}	577	3–2–1 (2–1–1)
October 20	3:37	at #8 Minnesota Duluth	#7	AMSOIL Arena • Duluth, MN	Gulstene	W 4–1	1,240	4–2–1 (3–1–1)
October 21	3:37	at #8 Minnesota Duluth	#7	AMSOIL Arena • Duluth, MN	Peters	W 2–1	1,259	5–2–1 (4–1–1)
October 28	4:07	#1 Wisconsin	#6	Ridder Arena • Minneapolis, MN	Peters	L 2–3	2,109	5–3–1 (4–2–1)
October 29	5:07	#1 Wisconsin	#6	Ridder Arena • Minneapolis, MN	Peters	L 1–2 ^{OT}	1,718	5–4–1 (4–3–1)
November 3	7:07	at Minnesota State	#6	Verizon Wireless Center • Mankato, MN	Peters	W 6–1	247	6–4–1 (5–3–1)
November 4	3:07	at Minnesota State	#6	Verizon Wireless Center • Mankato, MN	Gulstene	W 5–2	252	7–4–1 (6–3–1)
November 10	2:00	at Mercyhurst*	#6	Mercyhurst Ice Center • Erie, PA	Gulstene	W 2–1 ^{OT}	697	8–4–1 (6–3–1)
November 11	1:00	at Mercyhurst*	#6	Mercyhurst Ice Center • Erie, PA	Peters	W 5–2	612	9–4–1 (6–3–1)
November 17	6:07	St. Cloud State	#6	Ridder Arena • Minneapolis, MN	Peters	W 3–0	1,173	10–4–1 (7–3–1)
November 18	4:07	St. Cloud State	#6	Ridder Arena • Minneapolis, MN	Gulstene	W 4–3	2,187	11–4–1 (8–3–1)
November 25	2:00	at Lindenwood*	#6	Lindenwood Ice Arena • Wentzville, MO	Peters	W 3–1	324	12–4–1 (8–3–1)
November 26	2:00	at Lindenwood*	#6	Lindenwood Ice Arena • Wentzville, MO	Gulstene	W 4–3 ^{OT}	292	13–4–1 (8–3–1)
December 1	6:07	Bemidji State	#6	Ridder Arena • Minneapolis, MN	Peters	W 3–2 ^{OT}	1,723	14–4–1 (9–3–1)
December 2	4:07	Bemidji State	#6	Ridder Arena • Minneapolis, MN	Peters	L 2–4	1,893	14–5–1 (9–4–1)
December 8	7:07	Minnesota Duluth	#6	Ridder Arena • Minneapolis, MN	Peters	T 3–3 ^{OT}	1,708	14–5–2 (9–4–2)
December 9	4:07	Minnesota Duluth	#6	Ridder Arena • Minneapolis, MN	Peters	W 5–0	1,735	15–5–2 (10–4–2)
January 9, 2018	6:07	St. Cloud State*	#5	Ridder Arena • Minneapolis, MN	Peters	W 2–1	1,166	16–5–2 (10–4–2)
January 12	6:07	Vermont*	#5	Ridder Arena • Minneapolis, MN	Gulstene	L 2–4	1,342	16–6–2 (10–4–2)
January 13	4:07	Vermont*	#5	Ridder Arena • Minneapolis, MN	Gulstene	W 6–1	2,159	17–6–2 (10–4–2)
January 19	5:07	at #7 Ohio State	#5	Ohio State University Ice Rink • Columbus, OH	Peters	L 2–3	442	17–7–2 (10–5–2)
January 20	2:07	at #7 Ohio State	#5	Ohio State University Ice Rink • Columbus, OH	Gulstene	L 1–5	639	17–8–2 (10–6–2)
January 26	6:07	Minnesota State	#7	Ridder Arena • Minneapolis, MN	Peters	W 4–2	2,020	18–8–2 (11–6–2)
January 27	4:07	Minnesota State	#7	Ridder Arena • Minneapolis, MN	Peters	W 2–0	2,456	19–8–2 (12–6–2)
February 2	3:07	at St. Cloud State	#7	Herb Brooks National Hockey Center • St. Cloud, MN	Gulstene	T 3–3 ^{OT}	426	19–8–3 (12–6–3)
February 3	3:07	at St. Cloud State	#7	Herb Brooks National Hockey Center • St. Cloud, MN	Peters	W 5–2	452	20–8–3 (13–6–3)
February 16	7:07	at #1 Wisconsin	#7	LaBahn Arena • Madison, WI	Peters	L 3–4	2,273	20–9–3 (13–7–3)
February 17	3:07	at #1 Wisconsin	#7	LaBahn Arena • Madison, WI	Peters	L 0–1	2,273	20–10–3 (13–8–3)
WCHA Tournament
February 23	7:07	St. Cloud State*	#7	Ridder Arena • (Quarterfinals, Game 1)	Peters	W 5–1	1,017	21–10–3 (13–8–3)
February 24	4:07	St. Cloud State*	#7	Ridder Arena • (Quarterfinals, Game 2)	Peters	W 4–1	1,069	22–10–3 (13–8–3)
March 3	5:00	#5 Ohio State*	#7	Ridder Arena • (Semifinals)	Peters	W 2–0	2,499	23–10–3 (13–8–3)
March 4	2:00	#1 Wisconsin*	#7	Ridder Arena • (Finals)	Peters	W 3–1	1,854	24–10–3 (13–8–3)
NCAA Tournament
March 10	2:00	#2 Wisconsin*	#5	LaBahn Arena • Madison, WI (Quarterfinals)	Peters	L 0–4	2,423	24–11–3 (13–8–3)
*Non-conference game. ^{#}Rankings from USCHO.com Poll.

=== Roster ===
No.	Nat.	Player	Class	Pos	Height	DoB	Hometown	Previous team
2		Emily Brown	Freshman	D	5' 7" (1.7 m)	1998-12-30	Blaine, Minnesota	Blaine High School
4		Tianna Gunderson	Junior	F	5' 6" (1.68 m)	1996-08-27	Roseau, Minnesota	Roseau High School
5		Sophie Skarzynski	Junior	D	5' 8" (1.73 m)	1997-09-18	Lake Forest, Illinois	Loyola Academy
7		Taylor Williamson	Junior	F	5' 7" (1.7 m)	1996-08-20	Edina, Minnesota	Edina High School
8		Kippin Keller	Sophomore	F	5' 4" (1.63 m)	1997-12-16	Minnetonka, Minnesota	Minnetonka High School
9		Sydney Baldwin (C)	Senior	D	5' 7" (1.7 m)	1996-01-15	Minnetonka, Minnesota	Minnetonka High School
10		Cara Piazza (C)	Senior	F	5' 7" (1.7 m)	1995-10-09	Darien, Illinois	Downers Grove South High School
12		Grace Zumwinkle	Freshman	F	5' 8" (1.73 m)	1999-04-23	Excelsior, Minnesota	Breck School
14		Lindsay Agnew	Sophomore	F	5' 7.5" (1.71 m)	1998-03-09	Oakville, Ontario	King's Christian Collegiate
15		Jackie Pieper	Junior (RS)	F	5' 6" (1.68 m)	1995-10-09	Edina, Minnesota	Merrimack College (Hockey East)
16		Amy Potomak	Freshman	F	5' 9" (1.75 m)	1999-01-25	Aldergrove, British Columbia	George Eliot Secondary
17		Sierra Smith	Junior	F	5' 8" (1.73 m)	1996-09-02	Stillwater, Minnesota	Stillwater Area High School
18		Katie Robinson	Sophomore	D	5' 10" (1.78 m)	1997-10-08	Kasson, Minnesota	Kasson-Mantorville High School
19		Kelly Pannek	Senior	F	5' 8" (1.73 m)	1995-12-29	Plymouth, Minnesota	Benilde-St. Margaret's
20		Alex Woken	Sophomore	F	5' 8" (1.73 m)	1998-02-25	Fargo, North Dakota	Shattuck-Saint Mary's
23		Caitlin Reilly	Senior	F	5' 5" (1.65 m)	1995-09-05	Chanhassen, Minnesota	Penn State (CHA)
24		Olivia Knowles	Freshman	D	5' 9" (1.75 m)	1999-01-24	Campbell River, British Columbia	Penticton Secondary School
25		Nicole Schammel	Junior (RS)	F	5' 5" (1.65 m)	1996-04-09	Red Wing, Minnesota	Red Wing High School
26		Sarah Potomak	Junior	F	5' 5" (1.65 m)	1996-04-08	Aldergrove, British Columbia	George Eliot Secondary
27		Patti Marshall	Sophomore	D	5' 7" (1.7 m)	1998-05-11	Thief River Falls, MN	Shattuck-Saint Mary's
28		Taylor Wente	Freshman	F	5' 8" (1.73 m)	1999-04-01	Plymouth, Minnesota	Maple Grove High School
29		Alex Gulstene	Freshman	G	5' 8" (1.73 m)	1999-04-14	Vancouver, British Columbia	Penticton Secondary School
30		Serena D'Angelo	Sophomore	G	5' 4" (1.63 m)	1998-04-02	Stoney Creek, Ontario	Blyth Academy
31		Emma May	Junior	G	5' 6" (1.68 m)	1996-10-21	Eagan, Minnesota	Eagan High School
37		Sidney Peters	Senior (RS)	G	5' 10" (1.78 m)	1995-02-26	Geneva, Illinois	North American Hockey Academy
