= 2017–18 Penn State Nittany Lions women's ice hockey season =

- Conference: College Hockey America
- Home ice: Pegula Ice Arena

Record
- Overall: 10-15-11
- Conference: 6-7-7
- Home: 4-7-4
- Road: 5-7-6
- Neutral: 1-1-1

Coaches and captains
- Head coach: Jeff Kampersal (1st season)
- Assistant coaches: Allison Coomey; Celeste Brown
- Captain: Bella Sutton
- Alternate captain(s): Kelsey Crow, Aly Hardy

The Penn State Nittany Lions women represented Penn State University in CHA women's ice hockey during the 2017-18 NCAA Division I women's ice hockey season.

== Standings ==
2017–18 College Hockey America standings
	Conference							Overall					
	GP	W	L	T	PTS	GF	GA	GP	W	L	T	GF	GA
#10 Robert Morris†	20	14	3	3	31	75	30	33	21	8	4	122	70
Mercyhurst*	20	13	4	3	29	58	24	37	18	15	4	94	74
Syracuse	20	11	8	1	23	53	43	36	13	21	2	76	98
Penn State	20	6	7	7	19	43	36	36	10	15	11	65	69
Lindenwood	20	8	12	0	16	37	57	31	10	20	1	61	92
RIT	20	1	19	0	2	19	95	35	4	28	3	42	141
Championship: † indicates conference regular season champion; * indicates conference tournament champion Rankings: USCHO.com

- Rankings based on number of wins in the conference

== Roster ==
=== 2017–18 Nittany Lions ===
No.	Nat.	Player	Class	Pos	Height	DoB	Hometown	Previous team
1		Hannah Ehresmann	Senior	G	5' 8" (1.73 m)		Minnetonka, Minnesota	Minnetonka HS
2		Shea Nelson	Freshman	F	5' 8" (1.73 m)		Evanston, Illinois	Chicago Mission
3		Irene Kiroplis	Senior	F/D	5' 8" (1.73 m)		Georgetown, Ontario	Brampton Canadettes
5		Brooke Madsen	Sophomore	D	5' 5" (1.65 m)		Eagan, Minnesota	Team USA U18
7		Kelsey Crow (A)	Junior	D	5' 5" (1.65 m)		Minnetonka, Minnesota	Minnetonka HS
8		Christi Vetter	Senior	F	5' 11" (1.8 m)		Lakeville, Minnesota	Lakeville North HS
9		Morgan Rolph	Freshman	D	5' 11" (1.8 m)		Mitchell, Ontario	Kitchener-Waterloo Rangers
10		Abby Welch	Sophomore	F	5' 7" (1.7 m)		East Amherst, New York	Nichols School
11		Bella Sutton (C)	Senior	D	5' 6" (1.68 m)		Shoreview, Minnesota	Mounds View HS
13		Hannah England	Junior	F	5' 6" (1.68 m)		Simi Valley, California	Shattuck-St. Mary's
15		Aly Hardy (A)	Senior	F	5' 7" (1.7 m)		St. Albans, Vermont	Boston Shamrocks
16		Katie McMillan	Sophomore	D	5' 4" (1.63 m)		Minnetonka, Minnesota	Minnetonka HS
17		Sophie Slattery	Freshman	F	5' 7" (1.7 m)		Edina, Minnesota	Edina HS
19		Katie Rankin	Freshman	F	5' 9" (1.75 m)		Kanata, Ontario	Nepean Jr. Wildcats
20		Natalie Heising	Freshman	F	5' 5" (1.65 m)		Maple Grove, Minnesota	Wayzata HS
22		Olivia Villani	Sophomore	D	5' 10" (1.78 m)		Pittsburgh, Pennsylvania	East Coast Wizards
23		Kate Rydland	Sophomore	F/D	5' 9" (1.75 m)		Eden Prairie, Minnesota	Eden Prairie HS
24		Victoria Samuelsson	Junior	F	5' 7" (1.7 m)		Leksand, Sweden	Bay State Breakers
25		Amanda McLeod	Sophomore	F	5' 7" (1.7 m)		Calgary, Alberta	Edge School
26		Meike Meilleur	Junior	F	5' 10" (1.78 m)		Marquette, Manitoba	Team Manitoba
28		Caileah Forrest	Sophomore	D	5' 11" (1.8 m)		Ottawa, Ontario	Nepean Jr. Wildcats (WCHA)
32		Cam Leonard	Freshman	G	5' 7" (1.7 m)		Cary, North Carolina	Choate-Rosemary Hall
33		Chantal Burke	Freshman	G	5' 9" (1.75 m)		Saskatoon, Saskatchewan	Regina Rebels
34		Daniela Paniccia	Sophomore	G	5' 5" (1.65 m)		Oakville, Ontario	Oakville Jr. Hornets

== Schedule ==
Date	Opponent^{#}	Rank^{#}	Site	Decision	Result	Record
Regular Season
September 29	at #5 Minnesota-Duluth*		Amsoil Arena • Duluth, MN	Hannah Ehresmann	L 0–1	0–1–0
September 30	at #5 Minnesota-Duluth*		Amsoil Arena • Duluth, MN	Hannah Ehresmann	L 0–5	0–2–0
October 6	Union*		Pegula Ice Arena • University Park, PA	Hannah Ehresmann	W 3–1	1–2–0
October 7	Union*		Pegula Ice Arena • University Park, PA	Daniela Pannicia	T 1–1 ^{OT}	1–2–1
October 13	#2 Clarkson*		Pegula Ice Arena • University Park, PA	Daniela Paniccia	L 0-2	1–3–1
October 14	#2 Clarkson*		Pegula Ice Arena • University Park, PA	Daniela Paniccia	L 0-2	1–4–1
October 20	at Merrimack*		Volpe Complex • North Andover, MA	Daniela Paniccia	L 1-2 ^{OT}	1–5–1
October 21	at Merrimack*		Volpe Complex • North Andover, MA	Hannah Ehresmann	W 4-3 ^{OT}	2–5–1
October 28	#9 Robert Morris		Pegula Ice Arena • University Park, PA	Hannah Ehresmann	T 3-3 ^{OT}	2–5–2 (0–0–1)
October 29	#9 Robert Morris		Pegula Ice Arena • University Park, PA	Hannah Ehresmann	T 2-2 ^{OT}	2–5–3 (0–0–2)
November 3	Mercyhurst		Pegula Ice Arena • University Park, PA	Daniela Paniccia	L 1-3	2–6–3 (0–1–2)
November 4	Mercyhurst		Pegula Ice Arena • University Park, PA	Daniela Paniccia	T 1-1 ^{OT}	2–6–4 (0–1–3)
November 10	at Syracuse		Tennity Ice Skating Pavilion • Syracuse, NY	Daniela Paniccia	L 0-3	2–7–4 (0–2–3)
November 11	at Syracuse		Tennity Ice Skating Pavilion • Syracuse, NY	Hannah Ehresmann	T 2-2 ^{OT}	2–7–5 (0–2–4)
November 21	at #8 Cornell*		Lynah Rink • Ithaca, NY	Hannah Ehresmann	T 1-1 ^{OT}	2–7–6
November 24	at Connecticut*		Freitas Ice Forum • Storrs, CT (Nutmeg Classic, Opening Game)	Hannah Ehresmann	T 1-1 ^{OT}	2–7–7
November 25	vs. Yale*		Freitas Ice Forum • Storrs, CT (Nutmeg Classic, Consolation Game)	Hannah Ehresmann	T 2-2 ^{OT}	2–7–8
December 1	at RIT		Gene Polisseni Center • Rochester, NY	Hannah Ehresmann	W 5-0	3–7–8 (1–2–4)
December 2	at RIT		Gene Polisseni Center • Rochester, NY	Daniela Paniccia	W 2-0	4–7–8 (2–2–4)
January 5, 2018	at #6 Ohio State*		OSU Ice Rink • Columbus, OH	Hannah Ehresmann	W 5-1	5–7–8
January 6	at #6 Ohio State*		OSU Ice Rink • Columbus, OH	Hannah Ehresmann	L 0-2	5–8–8
January 12	at Lindenwood		Lindenwood Ice Arena • Wentzville, MO	Hannah Ehresmann	W 3-1	6–8–8 (3–2–4)
January 13	at Lindenwood		Lindenwood Ice Arena • Wentzville, MO	Daniela Paniccia	L 1-4	6–9–8 (3–3–4)
January 19	Syracuse		Pegula Ice Arena • University Park, PA	Hannah Ehresmann	L 2-3 ^{OT}	6–10–8 (3–4–4)
January 20	Syracuse		Pegula Ice Arena • University Park, PA	Hannah Ehresmann	L 1-2 ^{OT}	6–11–8 (3–5–4)
January 26	at Robert Morris		84 Lumber Arena • Neville Township, PA	Hannah Ehresmann	T 2-2 ^{OT}	6–11–9 (3–5–5)
January 27	at Robert Morris		84 Lumber Arena • Neville Township, PA	Hannah Ehresmann	L 2-4	6–12–9 (3–6–5)
January 30	Princeton*		Pegula Ice Arena • University Park, PA	Hannah Ehresmann	L 0-3	6–13–9
February 9	at Mercyhurst		Mercyhurst Ice Center • Erie, PA	Hannah Ehresmann	T 1-1 ^{OT}	6–13–10 (3–6–6)
February 10	at Mercyhurst		Mercyhurst Ice Center • Erie, PA	Hannah Ehresmann	T 1-1 ^{OT}	6–13–11 (3–6–7)
February 16	RIT		Pegula Ice Arena • University Park, PA	Hannah Ehresmann	W 4-1	7–13–11 (4–6–7)
February 17	RIT		Pegula Ice Arena • University Park, PA	Hannah Ehresmann	W 2-0	8–13–11 (5–6–7)
February 23	Lindenwood		Pegula Ice Arena • University Park, PA	Hannah Ehresmann	L 0-1	8–14–11 (5–7–7)
February 24	Lindenwood		Pegula Ice Arena • University Park, PA	Hannah Ehresmann	W 6-0	9–14–11 (6–7–7)
CHA Tournament
March 1	vs. Lindenwood*		HarborCenter • Buffalo, NY (Quarterfinal Game)	Hannah Ehresmann	W 2-1	10–14–11
March 2	vs. #9 Robert Morris*		HarborCenter • Buffalo, NY (Semifinal Game)	Hannah Ehresmann	L 2-7	10–15–11
*Non-conference game. ^{#}Rankings from USCHO.com Poll.
