= 2017–18 Syracuse Orange women's ice hockey season =

- Conference: 3rd College Hockey America
- Home ice: Tennity Ice Skating Pavilion

Record
- Overall: 13-21-2
- Conference: 11-8-1
- Home: 6-12-1
- Road: 6-8-1
- Neutral: 1-1-0

Coaches and captains
- Head coach: Paul Flanagan 10th season
- Assistant coaches: Alison Domenico; Brendon Knight
- Captain: Stephanie Grossi
- Alternate captain(s): Lindsay Eastwood; Allie Munro

The Syracuse Orange women represented Syracuse University in CHA women's ice hockey during the 2017-18 NCAA Division I women's ice hockey season.

== Offseason ==
=== Recruiting ===
Player	Position	Nationality	Notes
Ronnie Callahan	Forward	United States	Played with East Coast Wizards
Taylor Curtis	Forward	United States	Teammate of Callahan's on the Wizards
Edith D'Astous-Moreau	Goaltender	Canada	Represented Canada in IIHF U18 play
Jessica DiGirolamo	Defense	Canada	Played with the Oakville Jr. Hornets
Victoria Klimek	Forward	Canada	Played for Oakville and Stoney Creek of the PWHL
Emma Polaski	Forward	United States	Member of the New Jersey Colonials
Kristen Siermachesky	Defense	Canada	Chosen to Team Ontario Blue U18

== Standings ==
2017–18 College Hockey America standings
	Conference							Overall					
	GP	W	L	T	PTS	GF	GA	GP	W	L	T	GF	GA
#10 Robert Morris†	20	14	3	3	31	75	30	33	21	8	4	122	70
Mercyhurst*	20	13	4	3	29	58	24	37	18	15	4	94	74
Syracuse	20	11	8	1	23	53	43	36	13	21	2	76	98
Penn State	20	6	7	7	19	43	36	36	10	15	11	65	69
Lindenwood	20	8	12	0	16	37	57	31	10	20	1	61	92
RIT	20	1	19	0	2	19	95	35	4	28	3	42	141
Championship: † indicates conference regular season champion; * indicates conference tournament champion Rankings: USCHO.com

- Rankings based on number of wins in the conference

== Roster ==
=== 2017–18 Orange ===
No.	Nat.	Player	Class	Pos	Height	DoB	Hometown	Previous team
2		Logan Hicks	Sophomore	D	5' 9" (1.75 m)		Scottsdale, Arizona	St. Louis Lady Blues
3		Amanda Bäckebo	Sophomore	D	5' 3" (1.6 m)		Ganef, Sweden	Swedish National Team U18
4		Lindsay Eastwood	Sophomore (RS)	D	6' 1" (1.85 m)		Kanata, Ontario	Team Canada U18
5		Taylor Curtis	Freshman	F	5' 7" (1.7 m)		Peoria, Arizona	East Coast Wizards
7		Emma Polaski	Freshman	F	5' 7" (1.7 m)		Morristown, New Jersey	New Jersey Colonials
8		Stephanie Grossi (C)	Senior	F	5' 2" (1.57 m)		Winnipeg, Manitoba	Team Manitoba U18
9		Allie Munroe	Junior	D	5' 7" (1.7 m)		Yarmouth, Nova Scotia	New Hampton
10		Morgan Blank	Senior	F	5' 3" (1.6 m)		Fort Mitchell, Kentucky	Pittsburgh Penguins Elite
11		Kelli Rowswell	Sophomore	F	5' 9" (1.75 m)		Winnipeg, Manitoba	Team Manitoba U18
12		Kristen Siermachesky	Freshman	F	5' 11" (1.8 m)		New Liskeard, Ontario	Stoney Creek Jr. Sabres
14		Savannah Rennie	Sophomore	F	5' 7" (1.7 m)		East St. Paul, Manitoba	Team Manitoba U18
15		Sarah Stuehr	Junior	F	5' 4" (1.63 m)		Westwood, Massachusetts	Warner Hockey School
17		Ronnie Callahan	Freshman	F	5' 6" (1.68 m)		South Windsor, Connecticut	East Coast Wizards
18		Allie Olnowich	Sophomore	D	5' 7" (1.7 m)		Chatham, New Jersey	New Jersey Rockets
19		Dakota Derrer	Senior	D	5' 7" (1.7 m)		Mancelona, Michigan	Traverse City-St. Francis
20		Alysha Burriss	Senior	F	5' 6" (1.68 m)		Napanee, Ontario	Team Ontario Blue U18
21		Brooke Avery	Junior (RS)	F	5' 10" (1.78 m)		Concord, New Hampshire	New Hampshire
22		Jessica DiGirolamo	Freshman	D	5' 9" (1.75 m)		Mississauga, Ontario	Oakville Jr. Hornets
23		Megan Quinn	Senior	D	5' 9" (1.75 m)		Belleville, Ontario	Team Ontario Red U18
27		Victoria Klimek	Freshman	F	5' 8" (1.73 m)		Orangeville, Ontario	Oakville Jr. Hornets
29		Abbey Miller	Senior	G	5' 8" (1.73 m)		Anoka, Minnesota	Benilde-St. Margaret's
30		Maddi Welch	Junior	G	5' 7" (1.7 m)		East Amherst, New York	Niagara Jr. Purple Eagles
31		Edith D'Astous-Moreau	Freshman	G	5' 8" (1.73 m)		Laval, Quebec	Team Quebec U18
32		Ady Cohen	Sophomore	G	5' 6" (1.68 m)		Boynton Beach, Florida	Gilmour Academy

== 2017-18 Schedule ==
Date	Opponent^{#}	Rank^{#}	Site	Decision	Result	Record
Regular Season
September 29	at Bemidji State*		Sanford Center • Bemidji, MN	Abbey Miller	T 0-0 ^{OT}	0–0–1
September 30	at Bemidji State*		Sanford Center • Bemidji, MN	Abbey Miller	L 0-5	0–1–1
October 6	#1 Wisconsin*		Tennity Ice Skating Pavilion • Syracuse, NY	Abbey Miller	L 0-1	0–2–1
October 7	#1 Wisconsin*		Tennity Ice Skating Pavilion • Syracuse, NY	Abbey Miller	L 2-5	0–3–1
October 13	Providence*		Tennity Ice Skating Pavilion • Syracuse, NY	Abbey Miller	W 2-1	1–3–1
October 14	Providence*		Tennity Ice Skating Pavilion • Syracuse, NY	Abbey Miller	L 2-3 ^{OT}	1–4–1
October 20	#9 Northeastern*		Tennity Ice Skating Pavilion • Syracuse, NY	Abbey Miller	L 1-5	1–5–1
October 21	#9 Northeastern*		Tennity Ice Skating Pavilion • Syracuse, NY	Maddi Welch	L 1-5	1–6–1
November 4	#2 Boston College*		Tennity Ice Skating Pavilion • Syracuse, NY	Abbey Miller	L 3-4	1–7–1
November 10	Penn State		Tennity Ice Skating Pavilion • Syracuse, NY	Abbey Miller	W 3-0	2–7–1 (1–0–0)
November 11	Penn State		Tennity Ice Skating Pavilion • Syracuse, NY	Abbey Miller	T 2-2 ^{OT}	2–7–2 (1–0–1)
November 17	at RIT		Gene Polisseni Center • Rochester, NY	Abbey Miller	W 4-1	3–7–2 (2–0–1)
November 18	RIT		Tennity Ice Skating Pavilion • Syracuse, NY	Abbey Miller	W 5-1	4–7–2 (3–0–1)
December 1	Lindenwood		Tennity Ice Skating Pavilion • Syracuse, NY	Abbey Miller	W 4-1	5–7–2 (4–0–1)
December 2	Lindenwood		Tennity Ice Skating Pavilion • Syracuse, NY	Abbey Miller	L 0-2	5–8–2 (4–1–1)
December 5	#3 Clarkson*		Tennity Ice Skating Pavilion • Syracuse, NY	Abbey Miller	L ^{0-5}	5–9–2
December 8	at Mercyhurst		Mercyhurst Ice Center • Erie, PA	Abbey Miller	L 1-4	5–10–2 (4–2–1)
December 9	at Mercyhurst		Mercyhurst Ice Center • Erie, PA	Abbey Miller	L 1-2	5–11–2 (4–3–1)
January 5, 2018	at #9 Robert Morris		84 Lumber Arena • Neville Township, PA	Abbey Miller	L 2-5	5–12–2 (4–4–1)
January 6	at #9 Robert Morris		84 Lumber Arena • Neville Township, PA	Edith D'Astous-Morea	W 4-2	6–12–2 (5–4–1)
January 9	#6 Cornell*		Tennity Ice Skating Pavilion • Syracuse, NY	Edith D'Astous-Morea	L 3-6	6–13–2
January 16	at #4 Colgate*		Class of 1965 Arena • Hamilton, NY	Abbey Miller	L 1-2	6–14–2
January 19	at Penn State		Pegula Ice Arena • University Park, PA	Abbey Miller	W 3-2 ^{OT}	7–14–2 (6–4–1)
January 20	at Penn State		Pegula Ice Arena • University Park, PA	Abbey Miller	W 2-1 ^{OT}	8–14–2 (7–4–1)
January 26	Mercyhurst		Tennity Ice Skating Pavilion • Syracuse, NY	Abbey Miller	W 4-1	9–14–2 (8–4–1)
January 27	Mercyhurst		Tennity Ice Skating Pavilion • Syracuse, NY	Abbey Miller	L 0-4	9–15–2 (8–5–1)
January 30	at #2 Clarkson*		Cheel Arena • Potsdam, NY	Abbey Miller	L 1-4	9–16–2
February 6	at #6 Cornell*		Lynah Rink • Ithaca, NY	Edith D'Astous-Morea	L 0-5	9–17–2
February 9	RIT		Tennity Ice Skating Pavilion • Syracuse, NY	Abbey Miller	W 7-1	10–17–2 (9–5–1)
February 10	at RIT		Gene Polisseni Center • Rochester, NY	Edith D'Astous-Morea	W 6-0	11–17–2 (10–5–1)
February 16	at Lindenwood		Lindenwood Ice Arena • Wentzville, MO	Abbey Miller	L 0-1	11–18–2 (10–6–1)
February 17	at Lindenwood		Lindenwood Ice Arena • Wentzville, MO	Edith D'Astous-Morea	W 5-4	12–18–2 (11–6–1)
February 23	#9 Robert Morris		Tennity Ice Skating Pavilion • Syracuse, NY	Abbey Miller	L 0-5	12–19–2 (11–7–1)
February 24	Robert Morris		Tennity Ice Skating Pavilion • Syracuse, NY	Edith D'Astous-Morea	L 0-4	12–20–2 (11–8–1)
CHA Tournament
March 1	vs. RIT*		HarborCenter • Buffalo, NY (Quarterfinal)	Abbey Miller	W 5–1	13–20–2
March 2	vs. Mercyhurst*		HarborCenter • Buffalo, NY (Semifinal Game)	Edith D'Astous-Morea	L 2–3 ^{OT}	13–21–2
*Non-conference game. ^{#}Rankings from USCHO.com Poll.
