= 2017–18 St. Cloud State Huskies women's ice hockey season =

Sports team

- Conference: WCHA
- Home ice: Herb Brooks National Hockey Center

Record
- Overall: 1–1–0
- Home: 1–1–0
- Road: 0–0–0

Coaches and captains
- Head coach: Eric Rud
- Assistant coaches: Steve MacDonald; Jinelle Siergiej
- Captain: Brittney Anderson
- Alternate captain(s): Alyssa Erickson; Emma Turbyville

The St. Cloud State Huskies women's ice hockey program represent St. Cloud State University during the 2017-18 NCAA Division I women's ice hockey season.

== Recruiting ==
| Player | Position | Nationality | Notes |
|---|---|---|---|
| Hannah Bates | Defense | United States | Blueliner with Michigan Belle Tire |
| Emma Bigham | Forward | United States | Attended Minnetonka HS (Minnetonka, MN) |
| Tatum Coats | Defense | United States | Played for California Wave |
| Laura Kluge | Forward | Germany | Member of Team Germany |
| Emma Polusney | Goaltender | United States | Attended Mound-Westonka (MN) HS |
| Aubrey Pritchett | Forward | United States | Teammate of Coats on California Wave |
| Megan Roe | Forward | United States | Played with Michigan Belle Tire |
| Hallie Theodosopoulos | Forward/Defense | United States | Transfer from North Dakota |
| Abby Thiessen | Defense | Canada | Transfer from North Dakota |
| Taylor Wemple | Defense | United States | Attended Hill Murray (MN) HS |
| Kenzie Wylie | Defense | United States | Attended Blaine (MN) HS |

== Standings ==
2017–18 Western Collegiate Hockey Association standings
| | Conference | | | | | | | | Overall | | | | | |
| | GP | W | L | T | SW | PTS | GF | GA | GP | W | L | T | GF | GA |
|---|---|---|---|---|---|---|---|---|---|---|---|---|---|---|
| #2 Wisconsin† | 24 | 20 | 2 | 2 | 2 | 64 | 81 | 29 | 37 | 31 | 4 | 2 | 123 | 44 |
| #6 Ohio State | 24 | 14 | 6 | 4 | 3 | 49 | 63 | 51 | 38 | 24 | 10 | 4 | 112 | 76 |
| #5 Minnesota* | 24 | 13 | 8 | 3 | 0 | 42 | 74 | 54 | 38 | 24 | 11 | 3 | 119 | 79 |
| Minnesota Duluth | 24 | 10 | 11 | 3 | 2 | 35 | 49 | 62 | 35 | 15 | 16 | 4 | 71 | 82 |
| Bemidji State | 24 | 9 | 13 | 2 | 1 | 30 | 60 | 68 | 38 | 16 | 19 | 3 | 90 | 96 |
| St. Cloud State | 24 | 6 | 14 | 4 | 1 | 23 | 41 | 59 | 33 | 8 | 20 | 5 | 52 | 82 |
| Minnesota State | 24 | 3 | 21 | 0 | 0 | 9 | 37 | 82 | 34 | 5 | 28 | 1 | 57 | 123 |
Championship: March 4, 2018 † indicates conference regular season champion; * indicates conference tournament champion Rankings: USCHO.com

== Schedule ==
| Date | Opponent^{#} | Rank^{#} | Site | Decision | Result | Record |
Regular Season
| September 29 | Connecticut* | | Herb Brooks National Hockey Center • St. Cloud, MN | Janine Alder | L 0–1 ^{OT} | 0–1–0 |
| September 30 | Connecticut* | | Herb Brooks National Hockey Center • St. Cloud, MN | Emma Polusny | W 3–2 | 1–1–0 |
| October 6 | at Colgate* | | Class of 1965 Arena • Hamilton, NY | | | |
| October 7 | at Colgate* | | Class of 1965 Arena • Hamilton, NY | | | |
| October 20 | Ohio State | | Herb Brooks National Hockey Center • St. Cloud, MN | | | |
| October 21 | Ohio State | | Herb Brooks National Hockey Center • St. Cloud, MN | | | |
| October 27 | at Minnesota State | | Verizon Wireless Center • Mankato, MN | | | |
| October 28 | at Minnesota State | | Verizon Wireless Center • Mankato, MN | | | |
| November 3 | at Minnesota-Duluth | | Amsoil Arena • Duluth, MN | | | |
| November 4 | at Minnesota-Duluth | | Amsoil Arena • Duluth, MN | | | |
| November 10 | Bemidji State | | Herb Brooks National Hockey Center • St. Cloud, MN | | | |
| November 11 | Bemidji State | | Herb Brooks National Hockey Center • St. Cloud, MN | | | |
| November 17 | at Minnesota | | Ridder Arena • Minneapolis, MN | | | |
| November 18 | at Minnesota | | Ridder Arena • Minneapolis, MN | | | |
| November 22 | Bemidji State* | | Herb Brooks National Hockey Center • St. Cloud, MN | | | |
| December 1 | at Ohio State | | OSU Ice Rink • Columbus, OH | | | |
| December 2 | at Ohio State | | OSU Ice Rink • Columbus, OH | | | |
| December 8 | Wisconsin | | Herb Brooks National Hockey Center • St. Cloud, MN | | | |
| December 9 | Wisconsin | | Herb Brooks National Hockey Center • St. Cloud, MN | | | |
| January 5, 2018 | Minnesota State | | Herb Brooks National Hockey Center • St. Cloud, MN | | | |
| January 6 | Minnesota State | | Herb Brooks National Hockey Center • St. Cloud, MN | | | |
| January 9 | Minnesota* | | Ridder Arena • Minneapolis, MN | | | |
| January 19 | Minnesota-Duluth | | Herb Brooks National Hockey Center • St. Cloud, MN | | | |
| January 20 | Minnesota-Duluth | | Herb Brooks National Hockey Center • St. Cloud, MN | | | |
| January 26 | at Wisconsin | | LaBahn Arena • Madison, WI | | | |
| January 27 | at Wisconsin | | LaBahn Arena • Madison, WI | | | |
| February 2 | Minnesota | | Herb Brooks National Hockey Center • St. Cloud, MN | | | |
| February 3 | Minnesota | | Herb Brooks National Hockey Center • St. Cloud, MN | | | |
| February 9 | at Bemidji State | | Sanford Center • Bemidji, MN | | | |
| February 10 | at Bemidji State | | Sanford Center • Bemidji, MN | | | |
WCHA Tournament
| February 23 | TBD* | | (Quarterfinals, Game 1) | | | |
| February 24 | TBD* | | (Quarterfinals, Game 2) | | | |
*Non-conference game. ^{#}Rankings from USCHO.com Poll.
