= 2017–18 Robert Morris Colonials women's ice hockey season =

CHA Regular Season Champions
- Conference: 1st College Hockey America
- Home ice: Colonials Arena

Rankings
- USA Today/USA Hockey Magazine: 9th
- USCHO.com: 9th

Record
- Overall: 21–8–4
- Conference: 14-3-3
- Home: 8–3–1
- Road: 12–4–3
- Neutral: 1–1–0

Coaches and captains
- Head coach: Paul Colontino 7th season
- Assistant coaches: Logan Bittle; Chelsea Walkland
- Captain: Amanda Pantaleo
- Alternate captain(s): Brittany Howard; Katherine Murphy

The Robert Morris Colonials women represented Robert Morris University in CHA women's ice hockey during the 2017-18 NCAA Division I women's ice hockey season. The Colonials are the defending CHA champions.

== Offseason ==
- 4/4: Aneta Lédlová was a leading scorer for the Czech National Team at the IIHF World Championships, held in April, 2017 in Plymouth, Michigan.

=== Recruiting ===
Player	Position	Nationality	Notes
Emily Curlett	Defense	United States	Blueliner for Little Caesars
Anjelica Diffendal	Forward	United States	Played for Pittsburgh Penguins Elite
Emilie Harley	Forward	United States	Attended Ontario Hockey Academy
Sarah Lecavalier	Forward	Canada	Transfer from U North Dakota
Janey Sandoval	Forward	United States	Played for Minnesota Revolution
Morgan Schauer	Defense	United States	Played with Anjelica Diffendal on Pittsburgh Penguins Elite
Molly Singewald	Goaltender	United States	Culver Academy Grad
Allexan Templeman	Forward	Canada	Played for Kitchener-Waterloo Rangers

== Standings ==
2017–18 College Hockey America standings
	Conference							Overall					
	GP	W	L	T	PTS	GF	GA	GP	W	L	T	GF	GA
#10 Robert Morris†	20	14	3	3	31	75	30	33	21	8	4	122	70
Mercyhurst*	20	13	4	3	29	58	24	37	18	15	4	94	74
Syracuse	20	11	8	1	23	53	43	36	13	21	2	76	98
Penn State	20	6	7	7	19	43	36	36	10	15	11	65	69
Lindenwood	20	8	12	0	16	37	57	31	10	20	1	61	92
RIT	20	1	19	0	2	19	95	35	4	28	3	42	141
Championship: † indicates conference regular season champion; * indicates conference tournament champion Rankings: USCHO.com

- Rankings based on number of wins in the conference

== Roster ==
=== 2017–18 Colonials ===
No.	Nat.	Player	Class	Pos	Height	DoB	Hometown	Previous team
3		Brittany Howard (A)	Senior (RS)	F	5' 4" (1.63 m)		St. Thomas, Ontario	London Jr. Devilettes
4		Kirsten Welsh	Junior	D	5' 11" (1.8 m)		Blackstock, Ontario	Whitby Jr. Wolves
5		Emily Curlett	Freshman	D	5' 5" (1.65 m)		Lapeer, Michigan	Little Caesars U19
6		Janey Sandoval	Freshman	F	5' 5" (1.65 m)		West Fargo, North Dakota	Minnesota Revolution
8		Sarah Quaranta		F	5' 6" (1.68 m)		Niagara Falls, Ontario	Stoney Creek Jr. Sabres
9		Maggie LaGue	Junior	D	5' 8" (1.73 m)		Barre, Vermont	North American Hockey Academy
10		Lexi Templeman	Freshman	F	5' 2" (1.57 m)		Staffa, Ontario	Kitchener Waterloo Rangers
11		Natalie Fraser	Senior	D	5' 6" (1.68 m)		Ottawa, Ontario	Ottawa Jr. Lady Senators
12		Leah Carey	Senior	D	5' 9" (1.75 m)		Middleton, Wisconsin	Madison Capitols
15		Sarah Lecavalier	Sophomore	F	5' 4" (1.63 m)		Strathmore, Alberta	U North Dakota
17		Jaycee Gephard	Sophomore	F	5' 3" (1.6 m)		Plenty, Saskatchewan	Team Canada U18
18		Jessica Gazzola	Senior	F	5' 2" (1.57 m)		Thunder Bay, Ontario	Toronto Jr. Aeros
19		Katherine Murphy (A)	Senior	F	5' 3" (1.6 m)		Cary, North Carolina	North American Hockey Academy
20		Caitlyn Sadowy	Junior	F	5' 6" (1.68 m)		Woodbridge, Ontario	Mississauga Jr. Chiefs
21		Morgan Schauer	Freshman	D	6' 0" (1.83 m)		Cleveland, Ohio	Pittsburgh Penguins Elite
22		Emilie Harley	Freshman	F	6' 0" (1.83 m)		Syracuse, New York	Ontario Hockey Academy
23		Amber Rennie	Junior	F	5' 3" (1.6 m)		Saskatoon, Saskatchewan	Notre Dame Hounds
24		Anjelica Diffendal	Freshman	F	6' 0" (1.83 m)		Pittsburgh, Pennsylvania	Pittsburgh Penguins Elite
25		Aneta Lédlová	Sophomore	F	5' 6" (1.68 m)		Kadaň, Czech Republic	Czech National Team
27		Natalie Marcuzzi	Sophomore	F	5' 7" (1.7 m)		Thornhill, Ontario	Mississauga Jr. Chiefs
28		Amanda Pantaleo (C)	Senior	F	5' 5" (1.65 m)		Markham, Ontario	Toronto Jr. Aeros
29		Lauren Bailey	Junior	G	5' 9" (1.75 m)		Freeland, Michigan	Choate-Rosemary Hall
30		Molly Singewald	Freshman	G	5' 4" (1.63 m)		Farmington, Minnesota	Culver Prep
31		Elijah Milne-Price	Senior	G	5' 7" (1.7 m)		Mississauga, Ontario	Mississauga Jr. Chiefs

== 2017-18 schedule ==
Date	Opponent^{#}	Rank^{#}	Site	Decision	Result	Record
Regular Season
October 7	at Minnesota State*	#9	Verizon Center • Mankato, MN	Elijah Milne-Price	W 2-1	1–0–0
October 8	at Minnesota State*	#9	Verizon Center • Mankato, MN	Lauren Bailey	W 6-2	2–0–0
October 13	at Maine*	#10	Alfond Arena • Orono, ME	Elijah Milne-Price	W 2-1	3–0–0
October 14	at Maine*	#10	Alfond Arena • Orono, ME	Lauren Bailey	L 2-5	3–1–0
October 20	at Brown*	#10	Meehan Auditorium • Providence, RI	Elijah Milne-Price	W 11-0	4–1–0
October 21	at Brown*		Meehan Auditorium • Providence, RI	Elijah Milne-Price	W 3-2	5–1–0
October 28	at Penn State	#10	Pegula Ice Arena • University Park, PA	Elijah Milne-Price	T 3-3 ^{OT}	5–1–1 (0–0–1)
October 29	at Penn State	#10	Pegula Ice Arena • University Park, PA	Elijah Milne-Price	T 2-2 ^{OT}	5–1–2 (0–0–2)
November 3	at Lindenwood	#10	Lindenwood Ice Arena • Wentzville, MO	Elijah Milne-Price	W 6-0	6–1–2 (1–0–2)
November 4	at Lindenwood	#10	Lindenwood Ice Arena • Wentzville, MO	Elijah Milne-Price	W 4-2	7–1–2 (2–0–2)
November 10	RIT	#10	Colonials Arena • Neville Township, PA	Elijah Milne-Price	W 6-1	8–1–2 (3–0–2)
November 11	RIT	#10	Colonials Arena • Neville Township, PA	Elijah Milne-Price	W 5-2	9–1–2 (4–0–2)
November 24	#5 Ohio State*	#9	Colonials Arena • Neville Township, PA	Elijah Milne-Price	L 3-7	9–2–2
November 25	#5 Ohio State*	#9	Colonials Arena • Neville Township, PA	Elijah Milne-Price	W 3-2 ^{OT}	10–2–2
December 1	Mercyhurst	#9	Colonials Arena • Neville Township, PA	Elijah Milne-Price	L 0-1	10–3–2 (4–1–2)
December 2	Mercyhurst	#9	Colonials Arena • Neville Township, PA	Elijah Milne-Price	W 2-1	11–3–2 (5–1–2)
December 9	at #4 Colgate*	#10	Class of 1965 Arena • Hamilton, NY	Elijah Milne-Price	T 3-3 ^{OT}	11–3–3
January 5, 2018	Syracuse	#9	Colonials Arena • Neville Township, PA	Elijah Milne-Price	W 5-2	12–3–3 (6–1–2)
January 6	Syracuse		Colonials Arena • Neville Township, PA	Elijah Milne-Price	L 2-4	12–4–3 (6–2–2)
January 12	at #8 Ohio State*	#9	OSU Ice Rink • Columbus, OH	Elijah Milne-Price	L 0-5	12–5–3
January 13	at #8 Ohio State*	#9	OSU Ice Rink • Columbus, OH	Lauren Bailey	L 2-5	12–6–3
January 19	at RIT		Gene Polisseni Center • Rochester, NY	Elijah Milne-Price	W 12-1	13–6–3 (7–2–2)
January 20	at RIT		Gene Polisseni Center • Rochester, NY	Elijah Milne-Price	W 4-3 ^{OT}	14–6–3 (8–2–2)
January 26	Penn State		Colonials Arena • Neville Township, PA	Elijah Milne-Price	T 2-2 ^{OT}	14–6–4 (8–2–3)
January 27	Penn State		Colonials Arena • Neville Township, PA	Elijah Milne-Price	W 4-2	15–6–4 (9–2–3)
February 9	Lindenwood	#9	Colonials Arena • Neville Township, PA	Elijah Milne-Price	W 1-0	16–6–4 (10–2–3)
February 10	Lindenwood	#9	Colonials Arena • Neville Township, PA	Elijah Milne-Price	W 5-0	17–6–4 (11–2–3)
February 16	at Mercyhurst	#9	Mercyhurst Ice Center • Erie, PA	Elijah Milne-Price	L 0-2	17–7–4 (11–3–3)
February 17	at Mercyhurst	#9	Mercyhurst Ice Center • Erie, PA	Elijah Milne-Price	W 3-2	18–7–4 (12–3–3)
February 23	at Syracuse	#9	Tennity Ice Skating Pavilion • Syracuse, NY	Elijah Milne-Price	W 5-0	19–7–4 (13–3–3)
February 24	at Syracuse	#9	Tennity Ice Skating Pavilion • Syracuse, NY	Elijah Milne-Price	W 4-0	20–7–4 (14–3–3)
CHA Tournament
March 2	vs. Penn State*	#9	HarborCenter • Buffalo, NY (Semifinal Game)	Elijah Milne-Price	W 7–2	21–7–4
March 4	vs. Mercyhurst*	#9	HarborCenter • Buffalo, NY (CHA Championship Game)	Elijah Milne-Price	L 3–5	21–8–4
*Non-conference game. ^{#}Rankings from USCHO.com Poll.

== Awards and honors ==
- Brittany Howard,2017-18 Second Team All-America
