= 2017–18 Minnesota State Mavericks women's ice hockey season =

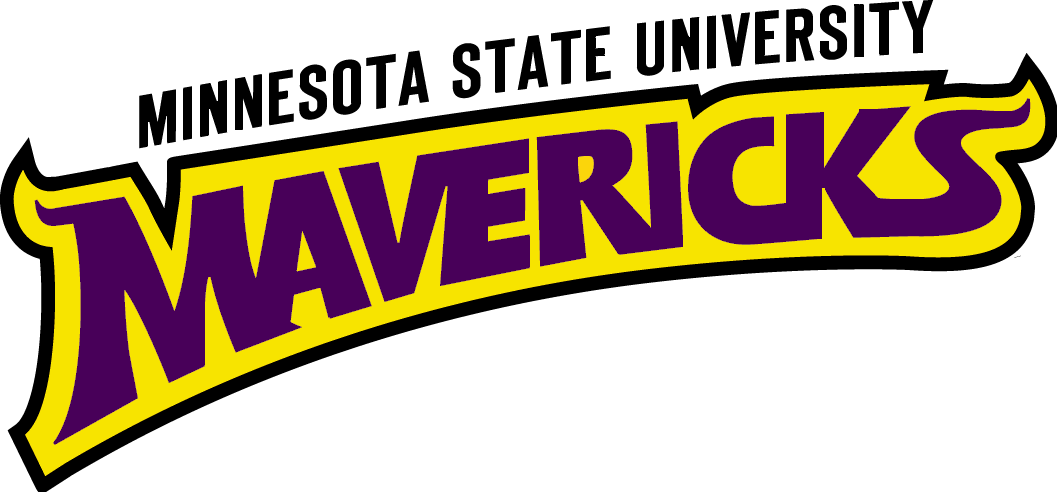
- Conference: WCHA
- Home ice: Verizon Wireless Center, Mankato, MN

Record
- Overall: 1-0-1
- Home: 0-0-0
- Road: 1-0-1
- Neutral: 0-0-0

Coaches and captains
- Head coach: John Harrington
- Assistant coaches: Jeff Giesen; Shari Dickerman

The Minnesota State Mavericks women's ice hockey program will represent Minnesota State University, Mankato during the 2017-18 NCAA Division I women's ice hockey season.

== Recruiting ==
Player	Position	Nationality	Notes
Brittyn Fleming	Forward	United States	Attended Oregon (WI) HS
Mariah Gardner	Forward	United States	Played Hockey at Warroad (MN) HS
Rebekah Kolstad	Forward	United States	Transfer from North Dakota
Jessica Kondas	Defense	Canada	Attended the Edge School
Tristen Truax	Forward	United States	Attended Shakopee (MN) HS

== 2017-18 Schedule ==
Date	Opponent^{#}	Rank^{#}	Site	Decision	Result	Record
Regular Season
September 29	at Lindenwood*		Lindenwood Ice Arena • Wentsville, MO	Katie Bidulka	W 4-1	1–0–0
September 30	at Lindenwood*		Lindenwood Ice Arena • Wentsville, MO	Chloe Crosby	T 2-2 ^{OT}	1–0–0
October 6	Robert Morris*		Verizon Wireless Center • Mankato, MN			
October 7	Robert Morris*		Verizon Wireless Center • Mankato, MN			
October 13	Wisconsin		Verizon Wireless Center • Mankato, MN			
October 14	Wisconsin		Verizon Wireless Center • Mankato, MN			
October 27	St. Cloud State		Verizon Wireless Center • Mankato, MN			
October 28	St. Cloud State		Verizon Wireless Center • Mankato, MN			
November 3	Minnesota		Verizon Wireless Center • Mankato, MN			
November 4	Minnesota		Verizon Wireless Center • Mankato, MN			
November 10	at Ohio State		OSU Ice Rink • Columbus, OH			
November 11	at Ohio State		OSU Ice Rink • Columbus, OH			
November 17	at Minnesota-Duluth		Amsoil Arena • Duluth, MN			
November 18	at Minnesota-Duluth		Amsoil Arena • Duluth, MN			
November 24	vs. Boston University*		Kettler Capitals Iceplex • Arlington, VA (DI in DC)			
November 25	vs. Northeastern*		Kettler Capitals Iceplex • Arlington, VA (DI in DC)			
December 8	Lindenwood*		Verizon Wireless Center • Mankato, MN			
December 9	Lindenwood*		Verizon Wireless Center • Mankato, MN			
December 15	at Bemidji State		Sanford Center • Bemidji, MN			
December 16	at Bemidji State		Sanford Center • Bemidji, MN			
January 5, 2018	at St. Cloud State		Herb Brooks National Hockey Center • St. Cloud, MN			
January 6	at St. Cloud State		Herb Brooks National Hockey Center • St. Cloud, MN			
January 12	at Wisconsin		LaBahn Arena • Madison, WI			
January 13	at Wisconsin		LaBahn Arena • Madison, WI			
January 26	at Minnesota		Ridder Arena • Minneapolis, MN			
January 27	at Minnesota		Ridder Arena • Minneapolis, MN			
February 2	Bemidji State		Verizon Wireless Center • Mankato, MN			
February 3	Bemidji State		Verizon Wireless Center • Mankato, MN			
February 9	Ohio State		Verizon Wireless Center • Mankato, MN			
February 10	Ohio State		Verizon Wireless Center • Mankato, MN			
February 16	Minnesota-Duluth		Verizon Wireless Center • Mankato, MN			
February 17	Minnesota-Duluth		Verizon Wireless Center • Mankato, MN			
WCHA Tournament
February 23	TBD*		TBD • TBD (Quarterfinals, Game 1)			
February 24	TBD*		TBD • TBD (Quarterfinals, Game 2)			
*Non-conference game. ^{#}Rankings from USCHO.com Poll.
