= 2017–18 Wisconsin Badgers women's ice hockey season =

WCHA Regular Season Champions
- Conference: WCHA
- Home ice: LaBahn Arena

Record
- Overall: 31–5–2 (.842)
- Home: 17–0–0 (1.000)
- Road: 12–2–2 (.813)
- Neutral: 2–3–0 (.400)

Coaches and captains
- Head coach: Mark Johnson
- Assistant coaches: Dan Koch; Jackie Crum; Mark Greenhalgh
- Captain(s): Claudia Kepler; Baylee Wellhausen
- Alternate captain(s): Lauren Williams; Sophia Shaver

The Wisconsin Badgers represented the University of Wisconsin in WCHA women's ice hockey during the 2017–18 NCAA Division I women's ice hockey season.

== Offseason ==
- Annie Pankowski and four alumni were named to the US National Team that will train for the 2018 Olympics in Korea, while Emily Clark and four alumni have been named to the Canadian team, which will send 23 of 28 players to Korea.

=== Recruiting ===
Player	Position	Nationality	Notes
Breanna Blesi	Goaltender	United States	Tended nets for Maple Grove HS (MN)
Grace Bowlby	Defense	United States	Played for Team USA U-18
Natalie Buchbinder	Defense	United States	Attended Shattuck-St. Mary's
Kristen Campbell	Goaltender	Canada	Transfer from North Dakota
Delaney Drake	Forward	United States	Played for North American Hockey Academy
Kyleigh Hanzik	Forward	United States	Teammate of Drake at NAHA
Brette Pettet	Forward	Canada	Played for Team Canada U-18
Maddie Posick	Forward	United States	Played for the Madison Capitols
Caitlin Schneider	Forward	United States	Played for the Chicago Young Americans

== Roster ==
=== 2017–18 Badgers ===
No.	Nat.	Player	Class	Pos	Height	DoB	Hometown	Previous team
1		Alyson Baldwin	Sophomore	G	5' 1" (1.55 m)		Richmond, Texas	Connecticut Southern Stars
2		Natalie Buchbinder	Freshman	D	5' 8" (1.73 m)		Fairport, New York	Shattuck-St. Mary's
3		Mikaela Gardner	Junior	D	5' 8" (1.73 m)		Plainfield, Illinois	Team USA U18
6		Presley Norby	Sophomore	F	5' 5" (1.65 m)		Minnetonka, Minnesota	Team USA U18
7		Sam Cogan	Junior	F	5' 8" (1.73 m)		Ottawa, Ontario	Team Canada U18
8		Maddie Rowe	Sophomore	D	5' 11" (1.8 m)		River Falls, Wisconsin	Minnesota Blades
10		Delaney Drake	Freshman	F	5' 7" (1.7 m)		Traverse City, Michigan	North American Hockey Academy
12		Sophia Shaver (A)	Junior	F	5' 10" (1.78 m)		Wayzata, Minnesota	Team USA U18
13		Maddie Rolfes	Senior	D	5' 8" (1.73 m)		West Des Moines, Iowa	Team USA U18
14		Alexis Mauermann	Sophomore	F	5' 2" (1.57 m)		Janesville, Wisconsin	Team USA U18
15		Caitlin Schneider	Freshman	F	5' 4" (1.63 m)		Glenview, Illinois	Chicago Young Americans
16		Maddie Posick	Freshman	F	5' 7" (1.7 m)		Stoughton, Wisconsin	Madison Capitols
17		Lauren Williams (A)	Senior	D	5' 9" (1.75 m)		Windsor, Ontario	Team Ontario Blue U18
18		Abby Roque	Sophomore	D	5' 7" (1.7 m)		Sault Ste. Marie, Michigan	Team USA U18
19		Annie Pankowski	Senior	F	5' 9" (1.75 m)		Laguna Hills, California	Irondale HS
20		Brette Pettet	Freshman	F	5' 3" (1.6 m)		Kentville, Nova Scotia	Team Canada U-18
21		Baylee Wellhausen (C)	Senior	F	5' 4" (1.63 m)		Williams Bay, Wisconsin	Shattuck St. Mary's
22		Mekenzie Steffen	Sophomore	D	5' 6" (1.68 m)		Centerville, Minnesota	Team USA U18
23		Kyleigh Hanzik	Freshman	F	5' 9" (1.75 m)		Wisconsin Rapids, Wisconsin	North American Hockey Academy
24		Claudia Kepler (C)	Senior (RS)	F	5' 4" (1.63 m)		Verona, Wisconsin	Ohio State
26		Emily Clark	Senior	F	5' 7" (1.7 m)		Saskatoon, Saskatchewan	Okanagan Hockey Academy
27		Grace Bowlby	Freshman	F	5' 8" (1.73 m)		Edina, Minnesota	Team USA U-18
29		Nikki Cece	Sophomore	F	5' 7" (1.7 m)		Oakville, Ontario	Oakville Jr. Hornets
32		Breanna Blesi	Freshman	G	5' 7" (1.7 m)		Maple Grove, Minnesota	Maple Grove HS
35		Kristen Campbell	Sophomore (RS)	G	5' 9" (1.75 m)		Brandon, Manitoba	U North Dakota

== Standings ==
2017–18 Western Collegiate Hockey Association standings
	Conference								Overall					
	GP	W	L	T	SW	PTS	GF	GA	GP	W	L	T	GF	GA
#2 Wisconsin†	24	20	2	2	2	64	81	29	37	31	4	2	123	44
#6 Ohio State	24	14	6	4	3	49	63	51	38	24	10	4	112	76
#5 Minnesota*	24	13	8	3	0	42	74	54	38	24	11	3	119	79
Minnesota Duluth	24	10	11	3	2	35	49	62	35	15	16	4	71	82
Bemidji State	24	9	13	2	1	30	60	68	38	16	19	3	90	96
St. Cloud State	24	6	14	4	1	23	41	59	33	8	20	5	52	82
Minnesota State	24	3	21	0	0	9	37	82	34	5	28	1	57	123
Championship: March 4, 2018 † indicates conference regular season champion; * indicates conference tournament champion Rankings: USCHO.com

== 2017-18 Schedule ==
Date	Opponent^{#}	Rank^{#}	Site	Decision	Result	Record
Regular Season
September 22	Lindenwood*	#2	LaBahn Arena • Madison, WI	Kristen Campbell	W 3-1	1–0–0
September 23	Lindenwood*	#2	LaBahn Arena • Madison, WI	Kristen Campbell	W 4-0	2–0–0
September 28	Mercyhurst*	#2	LaBahn Arena • Madison, WI	Kristen Campbell	W 4-0	3–0–0
September 29	Mercyhurst*	#2	LaBahn Arena • Madison, WI	Kristen Campbell	W 5-1	4–0–0
October 6	at Syracuse*	#1	Tennity Ice Skating Pavilion • Syracuse, NY	Kristen Campbell	W 1-0	5–0–0
October 7	at Syracuse*	#1	Tennity Ice Skating Pavilion • Syracuse, NY	Kristen Campbell	W 5-2	6–0–0
October 13	at Minnesota State	#1	Verizon Wireless Center • Mankato, MN	Kristen Campbell	W 3-2	7–0–0 (1–0–0)
October 14	at Minnesota State	#1	Verizon Wireless Center • Mankato, MN	Kristen Campbell	W 3-1	8–0–0 (2–0–0)
October 20	Bemidji State		LaBahn Arena • Madison, WI	W 5-1	9-0-0 (3-0-0)	
October 22	Bemidji State		LaBahn Arena • Madison, WI			
October 28	at Minnesota		Ridder Arena • Minneapolis, MN			
October 29	at Minnesota		Ridder Arena • Minneapolis, MN			
November 4	Ohio State		LaBahn Arena • Madison, WI			
November 5	Ohio State		LaBahn Arena • Madison, WI			
November 10	at Cornell*		Lynah Rink • Ithaca, NY			
November 11	at Cornell*		Lynah Rink • Ithaca, NY			
November 24	vs. Northeastern*		Kettler Capitals Iceplex • Arlington, VA (D1 in DC)			
November 25	vs. Boston University*		Kettler Capitals Iceplex • Arlington, VA (D1 in DC)			
December 1	Minnesota-Duluth		LaBahn Arena • Madison, WI			
December 2	Minnesota-Duluth		LaBahn Arena • Madison, WI			
December 8	at St. Cloud State		Herb Brooks National Hockey Center • St. Cloud, MN			
December 9	at St. Cloud State		Herb Brooks National Hockey Center • St. Cloud, MN			
January 12, 2018	Minnesota State		LaBahn Arena • Madison, WI			
January 13	Minnesota State		LaBahn Arena • Madison, WI			
January 14	Minnesota State		LaBahn Arena • Madison, WI			
January 19	at Bemidji State		Sanford Center • Bemidji, MN			
January 20	at Bemidji State		Sanford Center • Bemidji, MN			
January 26	St. Cloud State		LaBahn Arena • Madison, WI			
January 27	St. Cloud State		LaBahn Arena • Madison, WI			
January 28	St. Cloud State		LaBahn Arena • Madison, WI			
February 2	at Ohio State		OSU Ice Rink • Columbus, OH			
February 3	at Ohio State		OSU Ice Rink • Columbus, OH			
February 9	at Minnesota-Duluth		Amsoil Arena • Duluth, MN			
February 10	at Minnesota-Duluth		Amsoil Arena • Duluth, MN			
February 16	Minnesota		LaBahn Arena • Madison, WI			
February 17	Minnesota		LaBahn Arena • Madison, WI			
February 18	Minnesota		LaBahn Arena • Madison, WI			
*Non-conference game. ^{#}Rankings from USCHO.com Poll.

== Home attendance ==
Wisconsin led all NCAA Division I women's ice hockey programs in both average and total home attendance, averaging 2,265 spectators and totaling 38,505 spectators.

== Awards and honors ==
- Kristen Campbell, 2017–18 Second Team All-America
